= USS Triton (SSRN-586) =

US Navy radar picket submarine

Coordinates: 47.5544°N 122.6409°W

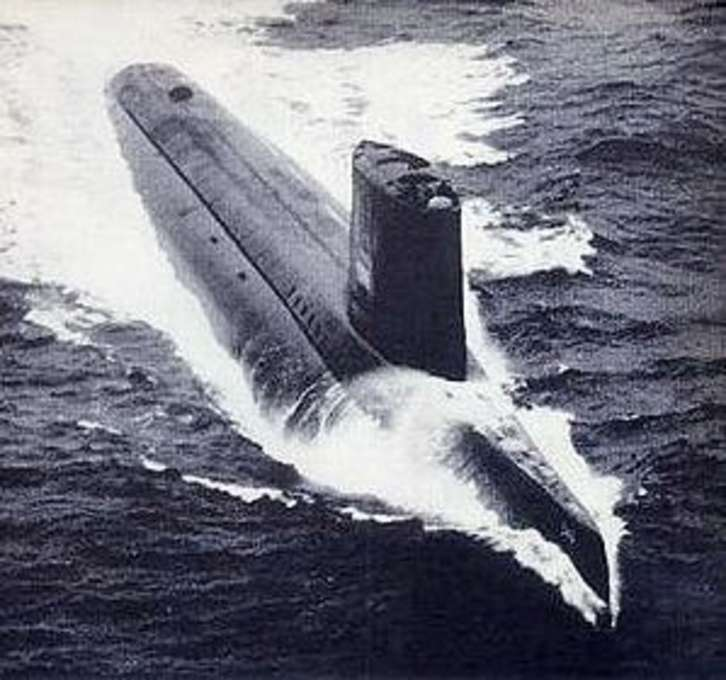
- USS Triton (SSRN-586)

History

United States
- Name: Triton
- Namesake: Triton
- Ordered: October 1955 (SCB 132)
- Builder: General Dynamics Electric Boat
- Cost: US$109 million in 1959 (equivalent to $1.2 billion in 2025)
- Laid down: 29 May 1956
- Launched: 19 August 1958
- Sponsored by: Willis A. Lent
- Commissioned: 10 November 1959
- Decommissioned: 3 May 1969
- Maiden voyage: 16 February 1960 to 11 May 1960
- Reclassified: 1 March 1961 (SSN-586)
- Refit: September 1962 to January 1964
- Stricken: 30 April 1986
- Home port: 1959: New London, Connecticut; 1964: Norfolk, Virginia; 1967: New London, Connecticut
- Identification: November – Delta – Bravo – Romeo (Radio Call Sign)
- Motto: Nulli Secundus; 'Second to None'
- Nickname(s): The Big T; Steel Raider; Building 586
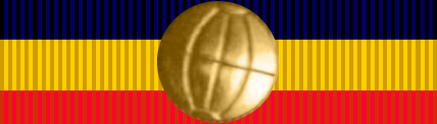
- Honors and awards: Presidential Unit Citation (1960); Navy Unit Commendation (1966); Navy Unit Commendation (1967)
- Fate: Recycled (sail was preserved and placed on display in a park in Richland, Washington)

General characteristics
- Type: 1959: Nuclear-powered Radar Picket Submarine (SSRN); 1961: Nuclear-powered Attack Submarine (SSN)
- Displacement: 5,963 long tons (6,059 t) surfaced; 7,773 long tons (7,898 t) submerged
- Length: 447 ft 6 in (136.40 m) overall
- Beam: 37 ft (11 m)
- Draft: 23 ft 6 in (7.16 m)
- Decks: 3 plus conning tower
- Installed power: 34,000 shp (25,000 kW)
- Propulsion: Two S4G pressurized-water nuclear reactors (PWR); Two steam turbines; Two five-blade propellers
- Speed: +30 knots (56 km/h; 35 mph) surfaced; +27 knots (50 km/h; 31 mph) submerged
- Endurance: Essentially unlimited
- Test depth: 700 ft (210 m) operational; 1,050 ft (320 m) crush
- Complement: 172 officers and enlisted men (radar picket role); 159 officers and enlisted men (attack role)
- Sensors & processing systems: Air search radar: AN/SPS-26 (1959); AN/BPS-2 (1962); Sonar systems: AN/BQS-4 (active); AN/BQR-2 (passive); Fire control system: MK-101
- Armament: 6 × 21 in (533 mm) Mk 60 torpedo tubes (four bow, two stern)

USS Triton (SSRN/SSN-586), the only member of her class, was a nuclear-powered radar picket submarine in the United States Navy. She was the only Western submarine powered by two nuclear reactors. Triton was the second submarine and the fourth vessel of the United States Navy (USN) to be named for the Greek god Triton. This naming convention was unusual at the time; USN submarines were usually named for various species of fish. At the time of her commissioning in 1959, Triton was the largest, most powerful, and most expensive submarine ever built at $109 million (equivalent to $1.2 billion in 2025) excluding the cost of nuclear fuel and reactors.

Triton's shakedown cruise in early 1960 saw her become the first vessel to execute a submerged circumnavigation of the Earth in Operation Sandblast. The voyage was made under the command of Captain Edward L. "Ned" Beach Jr. Triton's mission as a radar picket submarine was made obsolete after two years by the introduction of the carrier-based Grumman WF-2 Tracer airborne early warning aircraft. She was converted to an attack submarine in 1962 and became the flagship for the Commander, Submarine Forces, U.S. Atlantic Fleet (COMSUBLANT) in 1964. She was decommissioned in 1969, the first U.S. nuclear submarine to be taken out of service.

Triton's hull was moored at the St. Julien's Creek Annex of Norfolk Naval Shipyard in Portsmouth, Virginia, as part of the reserve fleet until 1993, though she was struck from the Naval Vessel Register in 1986. In 1993, she was towed to Puget Sound Naval Shipyard to await the Nuclear Powered Ship and Submarine Recycling Program. Triton landed on the keel resting blocks in the drydock basin on 1 October 2007 to begin this recycling process, which was completed effective 30 November 2009. Triton's sail superstructure was saved from the recycling process and is now part of the USS Triton Submarine Memorial Park located on Port of Benton Boulevard in Richland, Washington.

== Design history ==
=== General characteristics ===
Triton was a first-generation U.S. nuclear-powered submarine, along with Nautilus, Seawolf, Halibut, and Skate (and her three sisters). While serving as fully operational units of the U.S. Navy, the vessels also played key developmental roles. Nautilus introduced the use of nuclear power for ship propulsion. Seawolf used a liquid-metal nuclear reactor using liquid sodium as an alternative to pressurized water as a heat-exchange medium. Halibut was the first nuclear-powered submarine to perform a strategic nuclear deterrence patrol armed with Regulus cruise missiles. The Skate-class submarines were the first nuclear-powered submarine class with more than one boat built. Triton's unique contribution to the development of nuclear power for naval propulsion was her dual-reactor plant, which provided the speed required for radar picket missions.

Radar picket submarines (Navy classification "SSR") were developed after World War II to provide intelligence information, electronic surveillance, and fighter aircraft interception control for forward-deployed naval forces. Unlike destroyers used as radar picket ships during the war, these submarines could avoid attack by submerging if detected. The USN's MIGRAINE program involved converting existing fleet submarines into radar picket vessels, and the Navy also ordered two purpose-built, diesel-electric SSRs, Sailfish and Salmon. However, these were incapable of sustaining the high submerged or surfaced speeds necessary to operate with fast carrier task forces, so were unsuitable to the task.

Nuclear power offered the only possible solution. Triton was designed in the mid-1950s as a radar picket submarine capable of operating at high speed, on the surface, in advance of an aircraft carrier task force. Triton's high speed came from her twin-reactor nuclear propulsion plant, with a designed speed, surfaced and submerged, of 28 kn (32 mph; 52 km/h). On 27 September 1959, Triton achieved "well in excess of" 30 kn (35 mph; 56 km/h) during her initial sea trials.

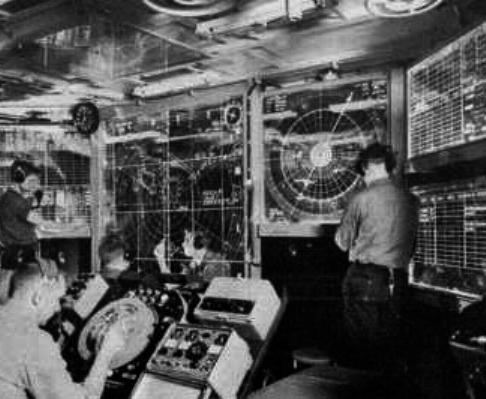
Triton's Combat Information Center, displaying status board and radar consoles

To meet her radar picket role, Triton's main air search radar initially used the AN/SPS-26, the USN's first electronically scanned, three-dimensional search radar, which was laboratory tested in 1953. The first set was installed on board the destroyer leader Norfolk prior to its installation on board Triton in 1959. Since it was scanned electronically in elevation, the AN/SPS-26 set did not need a separate height-finding radar. A submarine version of SPS-26, designated BPS-10, was under development, and it was slated for installation on Triton. To process her radar, electronic, and air traffic data, Triton had a combat information center (CIC) located in a separate air control compartment, situated between Triton's reactor and operations compartments.

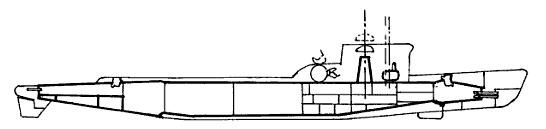
Cutaway drawing of a proposed nuclear-powered radar picket submarine, c. 1954

Design work on a nuclear-powered radar picket submarine (SSRN) began in 1954–1955. As initially designed, Triton had a three-level hull, with the CIC (see image) located on the middle level. Her overall length was initially 400 feet (120 m), with a beam of 38 feet (12 m). Also, as initially designed, her displacement was 4,800 tons surfaced and 6,500 tons submerged. January 1955 performance estimates called for the submarine advanced reactor (SAR) propulsion plant to produce 34,000 shaft horsepower (25,000 kW), with a surfaced speed of 27 kn (31 mph; 50 km/h) and a submerged speed of 23 kn (26 mph; 43 km/h). Triton initially had the same dual radar system installed on the non-nuclear Sailfish-class radar picket submarines (i.e., BPS-2 search radar and BPS-3 height-finder set) housed in a large, stepped sail (see image). Construction cost was initially estimated at $78 million. Subsequent growth of the SAR propulsion plant necessitated the overall increase in Triton's length and tonnage, although without any loss in speed, while the installation of the AN/SPS-26 3D search radar allowed the elimination of a separate height-finder.

Triton was to be the lead boat of a proposed class of nuclear-powered radar picket submarines. A December 1955 long-range naval planning report envisioned five carrier strike groups, each supported by two radar picket submarines. The total force included two non-nuclear Sailfish-class submarines and eight nuclear submarines. With construction costs for Triton escalating, this long-range requirement was revised in 1957 to provide four nuclear-powered radar picket submarines for a single nuclear-powered carrier group, with the four remaining conventionally powered carrier groups supported by two diesel-electric radar picket submarines each.

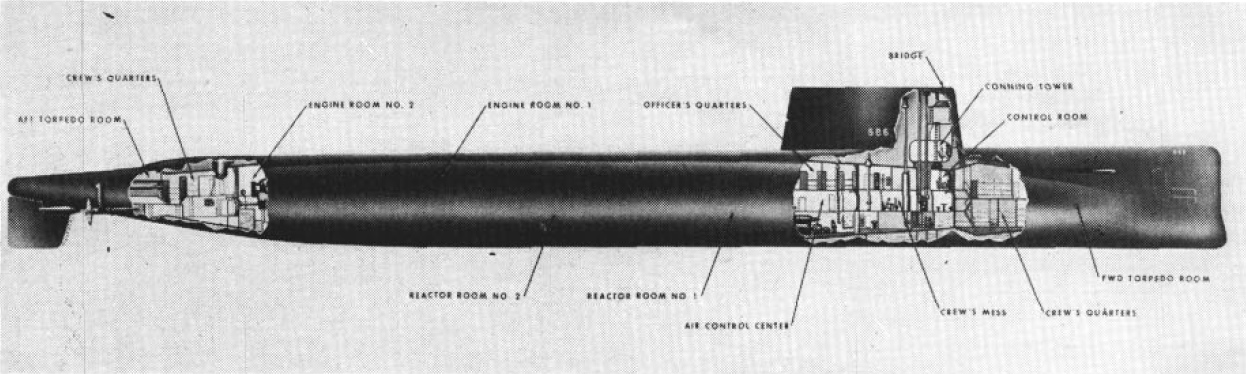
Contemporary cutaway (1959)

At the time of her construction, Triton was the largest submarine ever built. Her knife-like bow, with its bulbous forefoot, provided improved surfaced sea-keeping for her radar picket role. Her surface sea-keeping was further enhanced by high reserve buoyancy (30%), provided by 22 ballast tanks, the most ever in an American submarine. She was the last submarine to have a conning tower, as well as the last American submarine to have twin screws or a stern torpedo room. Her sail was the largest ever aboard an American submarine, measuring 70 feet (21 m) long, 24 feet (7.3 m) tall, and 12 feet (3.7 m) wide, and designed to house the large AN/SPS-26 3D air-search radar antenna when not in use. She also had a compartment solely for crew berthing, with 96 bunks, and two separate chief petty officers' quarters. With an overall length of 447.5 feet (136.4 m), Triton was the longest submarine in the history of the USN until the nuclear-powered ballistic missile submarine USS Ohio was commissioned in 1981.

Characteristics	Triton nuclear-powered radar picket submarine	I-400 submarine aircraft carrier	Surcouf "underwater cruiser"	USS Argonaut mine-laying submarine
Navy	United States Navy	Imperial Japanese Navy	French Navy	United States Navy
Commissioning date	1959	1944	1934	1928
Length	447 ft 6 in (136.40 m)	400 ft 0 in (121.92 m)	361 ft 0 in (110.03 m)	381 ft 0 in (116.13 m)
Beam	37 ft 0 in (11.28 m)	39 ft 4 in (11.99 m)	29 ft 6 in (8.99 m)	33 ft 9.5 in (10.30 m)
Draft	23 ft 6 in (7.16 m)	23 ft 0 in (7.01 m)	23 ft 8 in (7.21 m)	16 ft 0.25 in (4.88 m)
Surface displacement	5,963 long tons (6,059 t)	5,223 long tons (5,307 t)	3,250 long tons (3,302 t)	2,710 long tons (2,753 t)
Submerged displacement	7,773 long tons (7,898 t)	6,560 long tons (6,665 t)	4,304 long tons (4,373 t)	4,228 long tons (4,296 t)
Notes	(Note: Triton's submerged displacement was exceeded by USS Lafayette, commissioned in 1963. Her surfaced displacement was exceeded by USS Los Angeles, commissioned in 1976. Her overall length was exceeded by USS Ohio commissioned in 1981. At 453 ft 0 in (138.07 m), USS Jimmy Carter, commissioned in 2005, is the first USN attack submarine to exceed Triton's overall length.)	(Note: I-400-class submarines were the largest conventionally powered submarines ever built.)	(Note: The French submarine Surcouf was the largest submarine built before World War Two.)	(Note: USS Argonaut was the largest U.S. conventionally powered submarine ever built.)

=== Propulsion ===
Triton was the only submarine outside of the Soviet Union designed with a two-reactor propulsion plant. Her S4G reactors were seagoing versions of the land-based S3G reactor prototype. Both reactors composed the SAR program, a joint venture between the USN, Atomic Energy Commission (AEC), and General Electric. As originally designed, Triton's total reactor output was rated at 34,000 horsepower (25,000 kW). However, Triton achieved 45,000 horsepower (34,000 kW) during her sea trials (pictured), and her first commanding officer, Captain Edward L. Beach Jr., believed Triton's plant could have reached 60,000 horsepower (45,000 kW) "had that been necessary".

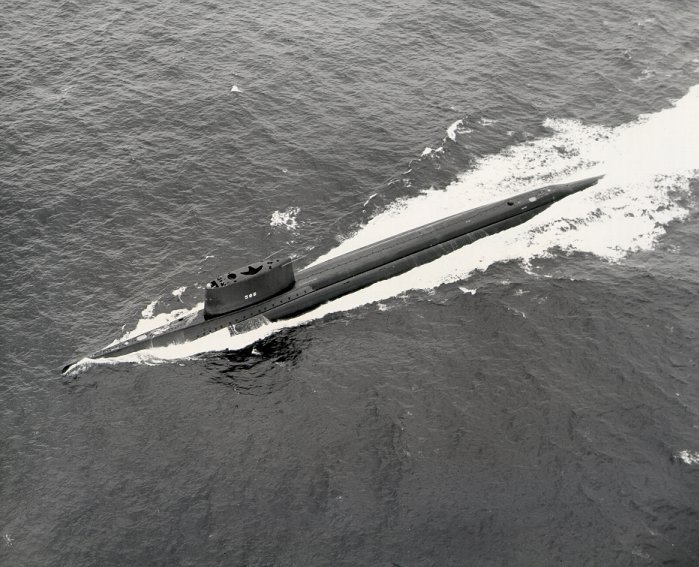
Sea trials (27 September 1959)

Both of Triton's reactors share the same compartment, with the number one reactor located forward and the number two reactor located aft within that compartment. The number one reactor supplied steam to the forward engine room and the starboard propeller shaft. The number two reactor supplied steam to the after engine room and the port propeller shaft. Each reactor could individually supply steam for the entire ship, or the reactors could be cross-connected as required. This enhanced reliability, redundancy, and dependability of a dual-reactor plant was a key factor in the selection of Triton to undertake the first submerged circumnavigation of the world.

Triton's dual-reactor plant met a number of operational and engineering objectives, specifically the high speed requirement to meet her radar picket mission, which continues to be a source of speculation and controversy to this day. During the early 1950s, many engineers at the Naval Reactors branch of the AEC were concerned about depending on single-reactor plants for submarine operations, particularly involving under-the-ice Arctic missions. The presence of two deaerating feed tanks, which are used only on surface warships, suggested that Triton's twin-reactor plant may have served as a testbed for future multireactor surface warships. The SAR program was the first production naval reactor developed by General Electric for the USN, and GE used this SAR experience for the high power reactor program that led to the development of the D1G and D2G naval reactors used on Bainbridge, Truxtun, California, and Virginia classes of nuclear-powered surface ships.

Finally, the USN was debating the best approach to optimize performance, particularly underwater speed, for its nuclear submarine fleet. Triton achieved high speeds through brute horsepower, rather than the more hydrodynamically efficient teardrop-shaped hull form pioneered by Albacore, which when combined with nuclear power, allowed Skipjack to achieve higher speed with less horsepower.

=== Combat systems ===
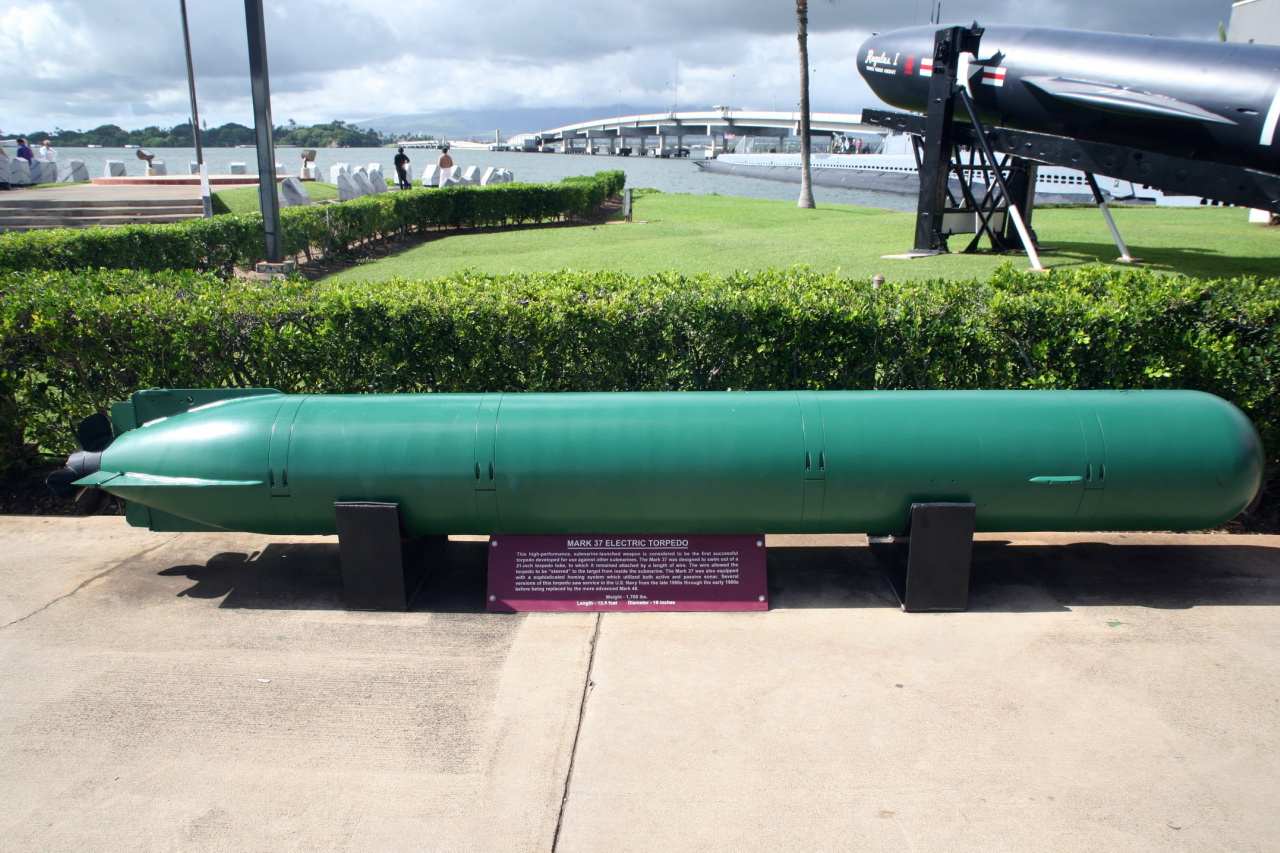
Mark 37 electric torpedo

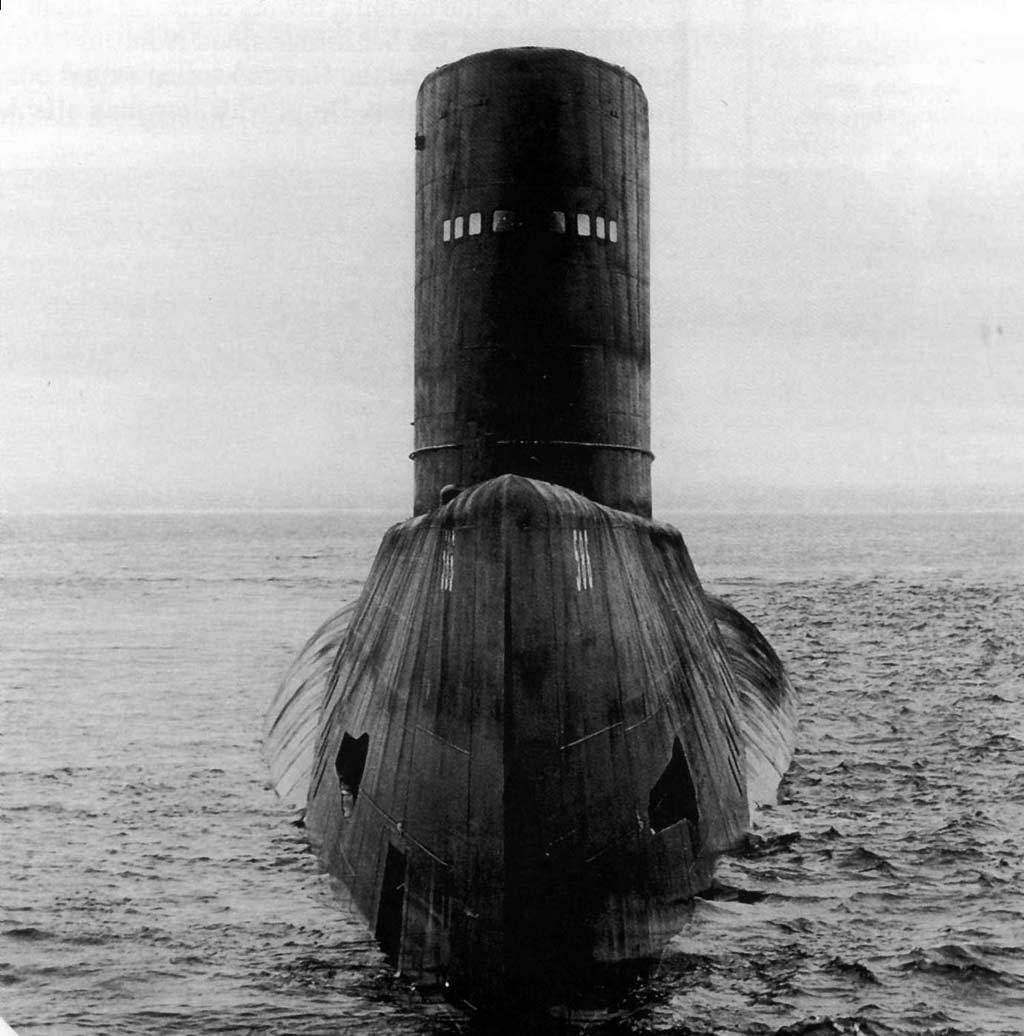
Undated bow view of USS Triton

==== Weapon systems ====
Triton's armament consisted of six Mark 60 torpedo tubes, four at the bow and two astern. The Mark 60 system was a 249.8-inch (6,340 mm)-long hydraulic-launch tube that did not have power-handling capability. The standard torpedo carried by Triton was the Mark 37, with a weapon load of 10 forward and five aft. Triton's first commanding officer, "Ned" Beach, noted the torpedo load in the forward torpedo room could have been doubled with the removal of a single support girder.

==== Fire control and electronics ====
Triton's main air search radar was the electronically scanned, three-dimensional AN/SPS-26. This system had a range of 65 nautical miles (120 km; 75 mi) and was capable of tracking aircraft up to an altitude of 75,000 feet (23,000 m). Since it scanned electronically in elevation, it did not need a separate height-finding set. When not in use, the SPS-26 radar was lowered into its fairwater housing for stowage within Triton's massive sail (pictured). A submarine version of SPS-26, designated BPS-10, was under development at the time of Triton's construction, slated for eventual installation on Triton.

Triton's long-range, passive detecting-ranging sonar was the AN/BQR-7, which had a listening range up to 20 nautical miles (37 km; 23 mi) for surfaced or snorkeling submarines, optimized to 35 nautical miles (65 km; 40 mi), with target tracking capability within 5° of accuracy. The chin-mounted AN/BQR-2 passive sonar array supplemented the active BQS-4, with a range up to 10 nautical miles (19 km; 12 mi) and a bearing accuracy of 1/10 of a degree, allowing the BQR-2 to be used for fire control in torpedo attacks.

Triton's target fire-control system was the Mark 101, a postwar development that incorporated target tracking and ranging data into a position keeper, with a pair of analyzers that automatically revised torpedo gyroscopes and settings as the target position changed. This automation greatly simplified a targeting solution for a plotting party. Previously, targeting solutions were manually estimated target bearings, which were then fed into the Torpedo Data Computer, a method used throughout the Pacific Theater during World War II. However, while entirely capable of providing efficient fire-control solutions against postwar non-nuclear hunter-killer submarines, the Mark 101 proved to be less responsive to the rapid changes associated with nuclear submarine operations.

The number one periscope was Triton's navigational periscope, and it had a built-in sextant developed by the Kollmorgen Optical Company that allowed navigators to observe celestial bodies to obtain an accurate star fix to plot the ship's course and position.

== Construction history ==
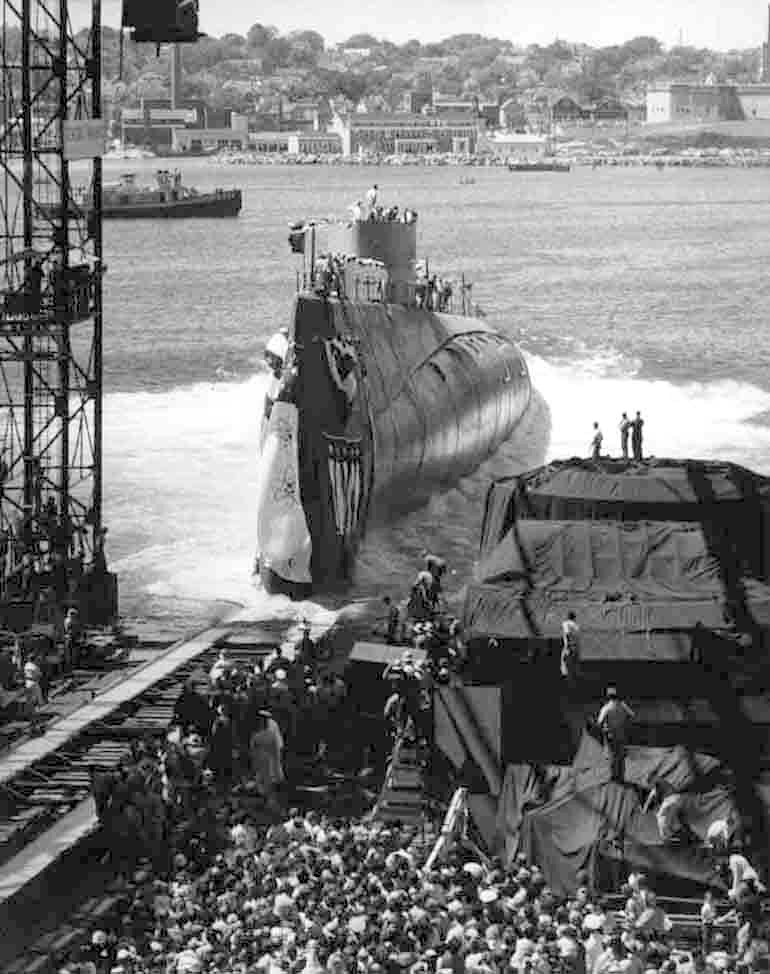
Launch of USS Triton (19 August 1958)

=== Authorization ===
The USN ordered a "large radar picket using the advanced two-reactor system", designated SCB 132, in October 1955 under the United States Department of Defense appropriation for Fiscal Year 1956. This 1956 shipbuilding program was significant because it included authorization for the construction of eight submarines in total, the largest such order since World War II. Along with Triton, the FY-56 program included four additional nuclear-powered submarines – guided missile submarine Halibut, the lead ship for the Skipjack class, and the final two Skate-class submarines, Sargo and Seadragon. The 1956 program not only completed the final authorization for all of the USN's first-generation nuclear submarines, but with Skipjack, it also marked the initial authorization for a second-generation nuclear submarine. Finally, the 1956 program included the three submarines of the diesel-electric Barbel class, the last non-nuclear attack submarines to be built for the USN. Henceforth, the USN submarine service would be a nuclear-powered force.

=== Keel-laying ===
Triton's keel was laid down on 29 May 1956 in Groton, Connecticut, by the Electric Boat Division of the General Dynamics Corporation. Her length presented Electric Boat with many problems during her construction. She was so long, her bow obstructed the slipway's railway facility, used for transporting material around the yard. Consequently, the lower half of her bow was cut away to facilitate yard operations and was reattached just days prior to her launch. Similarly, the last 50 feet (15 m) of her stern were built on an adjoining slip and attached to the rest of the hull before Triton's launch. Her sail was found to be too high to go under the scaffolding, so the top 12 feet (3.7 m) were cut away and reattached later.

Even before her launch, considerable discussion arose of Triton's role beyond her radar picket mission. An internal USN memorandum set forth four options for the submarine's extended use. These included configuration to serve as a command ship (SSCN) for a fleet or force commander, an advanced sonar scout for the fleet, a Regulus missile submarine (SSGN), or a minelaying submarine. However, with the exception of the command ship option, all of these proposed configurations required extensive modification of her original design.

Another potential mission was as an underwater tug, able to rescue disabled submarines under the Arctic ice pack. Triton's first commanding officer, Captain Edward L. Beach, Jr., requested plans be drawn up for this modification, which he characterized as "easy and inexpensive". Although consideration was given for a deployment to Arctic waters, no evidence indictes that Triton was ever employed as an underwater tug.

=== Launching ===
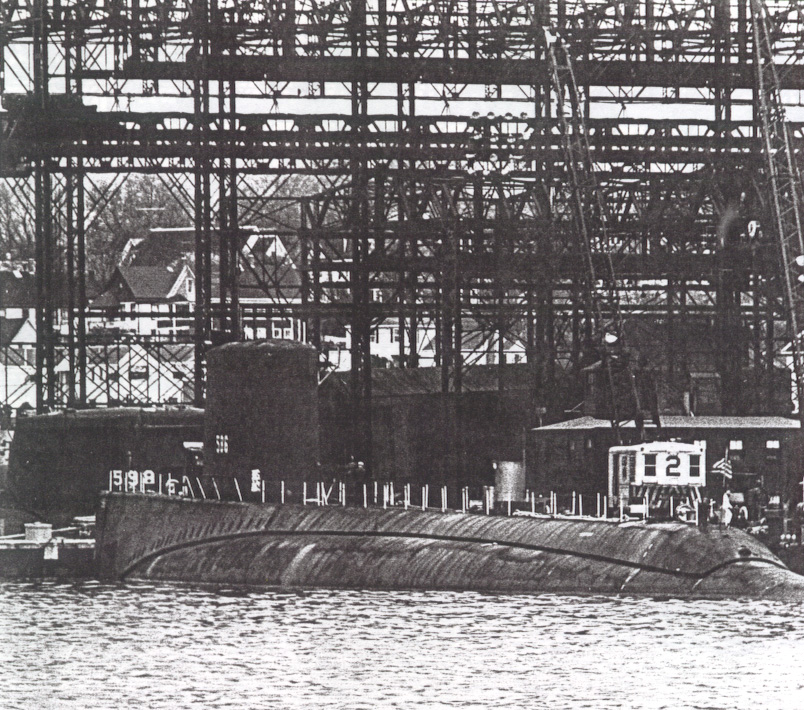
Triton undergoing postlaunch fitting-out at General Dynamics' Electric Boat shipyard in Groton, Connecticut

Triton was launched on 19 August 1958, with Louise Willis, the wife of Vice Admiral John Wills, USN (ret.), as her sponsor. The principal address was delivered by Admiral Jerauld Wright, the commander-in-chief of the U.S. Atlantic Command (CINCLANT), the commander-in-chief of the U.S. Atlantic Fleet (CINCLANTFLT) and Supreme Allied Commander Atlantic (SACLANT) for NATO. Over 35,000 guests attended, the largest crowd to witness a submarine launching up to that time.

=== Fitting out ===
On 1 February 1959, Triton was provisionally accepted for service in the USN, with Captain Beach, the prospective commanding officer, now designated as officer-in-charge. Triton met several key milestones before her commissioning. On 8 February 1959, reactor number two achieved initial criticality, while reactor number one achieved this milestone on 3 April 1959.

Two shipboard accidents occurred during Triton's postlaunch fitting-out. On 2 October 1958, prior to the nuclear reactor fuel being installed, a steam valve failed during testing, causing a large cloud of steam that filled the number two reactor compartment, and on 7 April 1959, a fire broke out during the testing of a deep-fat fryer and spread from the galley into the ventilation lines of the crew's mess. Neither incident was nuclear related and both were quickly handled by the boat's personnel, with Lieutenant Commander Leslie D. Kelly, the prospective chief engineering officer, being awarded the Navy and Marine Corps Medal for his quick action during the incident on 2 October.

=== Sea trials ===
Triton began her sea trials on 27 September 1959. Over the next five days, the boat's systems and equipment were thoroughly tested under the overall direction of Admiral Hyman G. Rickover of the Bureau of Ships' Naval Reactors branch and Captain A. C. Smith, the supervisor of shipbuilding at Electric Boat. Triton generated 45,000 horsepower (34,000 kW) on sea trials, reaching her design surface speed of 27 knots (50 km/h; 31 mph), and she achieved a surface speed well in excess of 30 knots (56 km/h; 35 mph). Triton subsequently executed a four-hour, full-power submerged run and a crash-back maneuver. (Note: Crashback is a maneuver which occurs when a ship or submarine reverses its propeller while traveling forward, slowing or stopping that vessel. This results in unpredictable forces on the ship's hull, rudder, and propeller, resulting in decreased control and maneuverability.) The only significant problem encountered during her initial sea trials was the overheating of the lubricating oil system for the starboard propeller shaft spring bearing. At the recommendation of Admiral Rickover, a hose was rigged to spray the bearing housing with a steady stream of sea water to keep the shaft cool, as well as a special watch set to monitor the temperature of the lube oil.

Triton began her preliminary acceptance trials on 20 September 1959. These trials were conducted under the supervision of Rear Admiral Francis Douglas McCorkle of the USN's Board of Inspection and Survey. After three days of at-sea tests, Triton was passed by the board as being ready to enter service as a U.S. naval vessel.

== Operational history ==
=== Commissioning ===
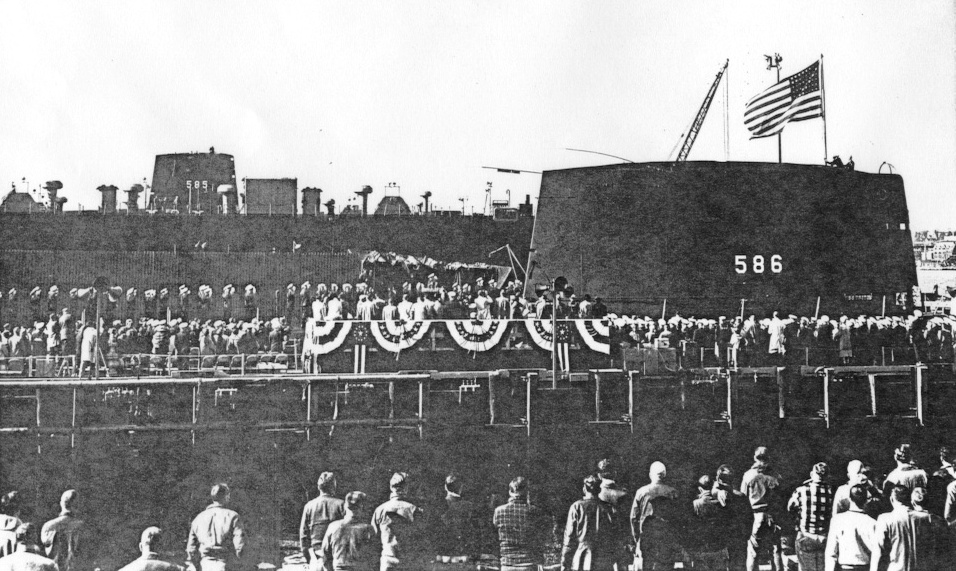
Triton is commissioned on 10 November 1959.

Triton was commissioned on 10 November 1959 with Captain Edward L. Beach, Jr., in command. Vice Admiral Bernard L. Austin, the deputy chief of naval operations for Plans and Policy, made the keynote address, noting:

As the largest submarine ever built, her performance will be carefully followed by naval designers and planners the world over. For many years strategists have speculated on the possibilities of tankers, cargo ships and transports that could navigate under water. Some of our more futuristic dreamers have talked of whole fleets that submerge. Triton is a bold venture into this field.

The widow of the late Rear Admiral Willis A. "Pilly" Lent presented the original ship's bell from the first Triton at the new commissioning ceremony. The late Admiral Lent had been the earlier Triton's first commanding officer. A watercolor painting of the submarine also was presented by the American Water Color Society. The final cost of building Triton, less her reactors, nuclear fuel, and other related costs paid by the AEC, was US$109,000,000, making Triton the most expensive submarine ever built at the time of her commissioning.

Triton was assigned to Submarine Squadron 10, the USN's first all-nuclear force, based at State Pier in New London, Connecticut, under the command of Commodore Tom Henry. Triton subsequently completed torpedo trials at Naval Station Newport and conducted other special tests at the Norfolk Navy Base before returning to Electric Boat on 7 December 1959 to install special communications equipment, including a prototype of the BRA-3 towed communications buoy system housed in a large fairing located on the aft end of the main deck. Work on Triton at Electric Boat was delayed, as priority was given to completing the USN's first two fleet ballistic missile submarines, George Washington and Patrick Henry, with the objective for both vessels to start their first nuclear deterrence patrols before the end of 1960.

On 20 January 1960, Triton got underway to conduct an accelerated series of at-sea testing. Triton returned on 1 February as preparations continued for her forthcoming shakedown cruise, scheduled for departure on 16 February 1960, which involved operating with the command ship Northampton, flagship of the U.S. Second Fleet, in northern European waters. On 1 February, Captain Beach received a message from Rear Admiral Lawrence R. "Dan" Daspit (COMSUBLANT) instructing Beach to attend a top secret meeting at the Pentagon on 4 February 1960 that led to the execution of Operation Sandblast, the first submerged circumnavigation of the world.

=== Shakedown cruise ===
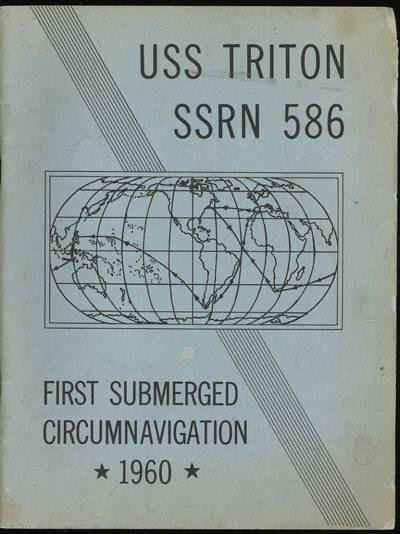
First Submerged Circumnavigation *1960* (GPO)

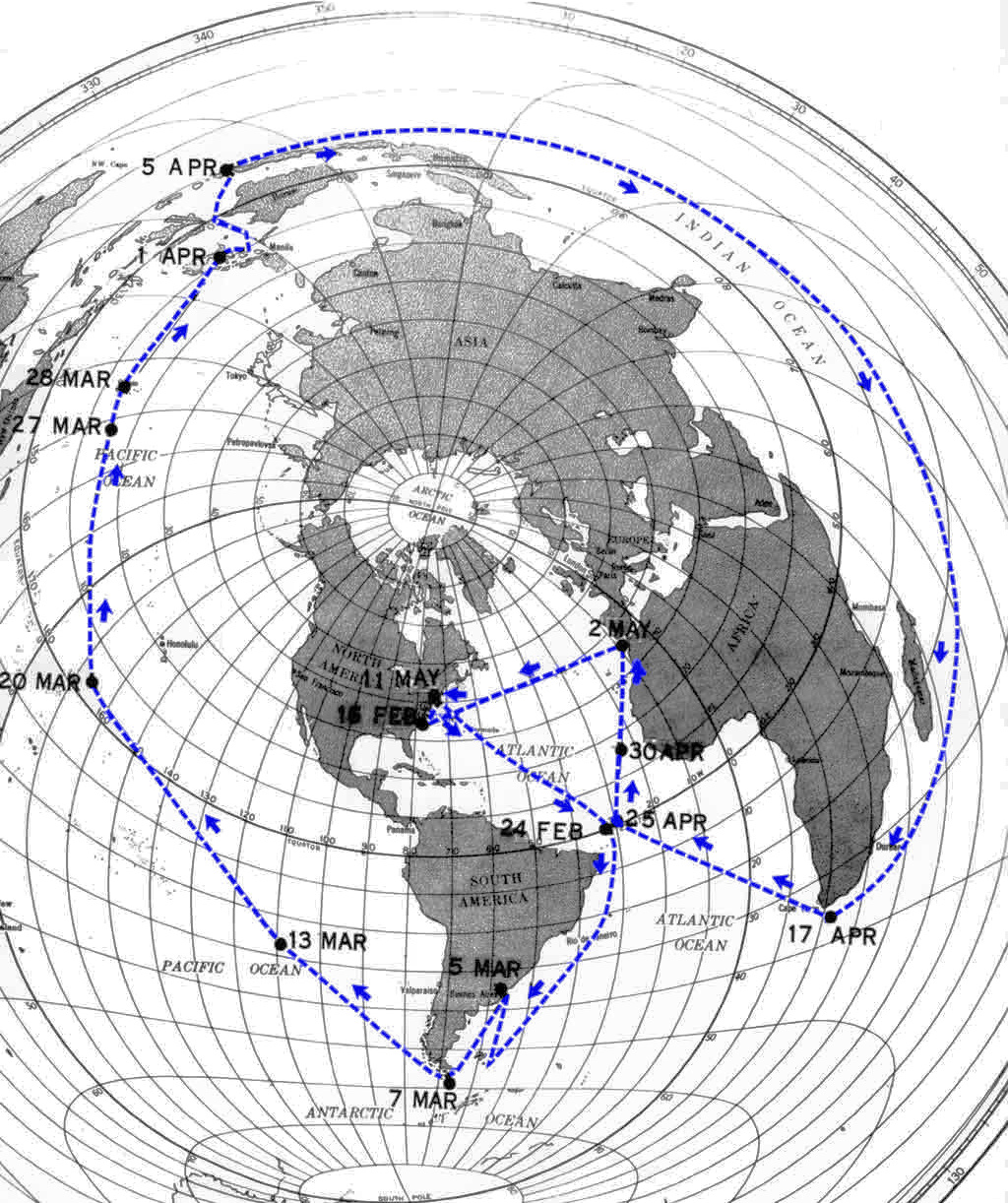
Triton's circumnavigation track and milestones

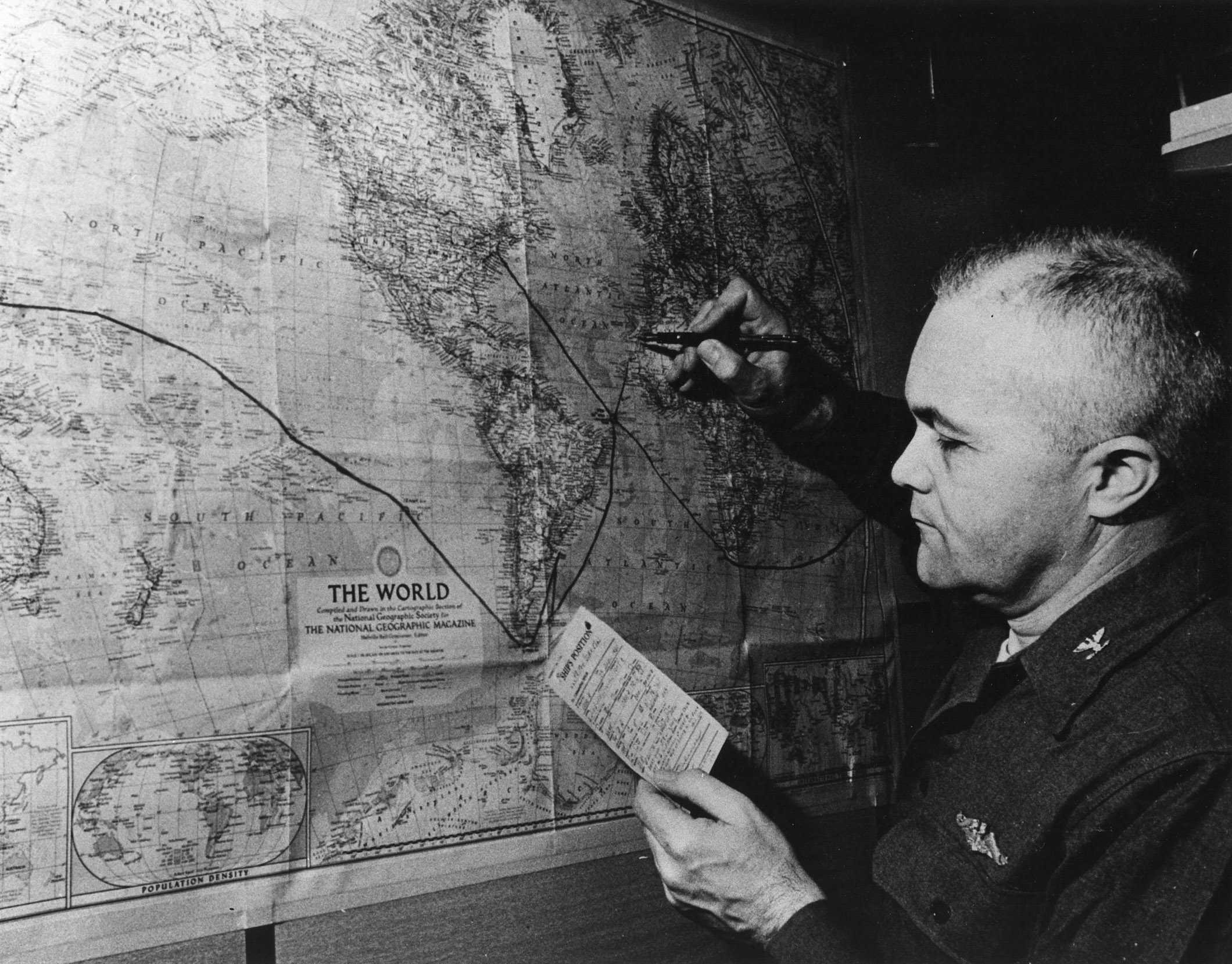
Captain Beach traces the route of Triton's submerged circumnavigation.

During her shakedown cruise, Triton successfully executed the first submerged circumnavigation of the world, code named Operation Sandblast, following the same track as the first circumnavigation led by Ferdinand Magellan. The mission's objectives were set forth in the published ship's log (pictured):

For purposes of geophysical and oceanographic research and to determine habitability, endurance and psychological stress – all extremely important to the Polaris program – it had been decided that a rapid round-the-world trip, touching the areas of interest, should be conducted. Maximum stability of the observing platform and unbroken continuity around the world were important. Additionally, for reasons of the national interest it had been decided that the voyage should be made entirely submerged undetected by our own or other forces and completed as soon as possible. TRITON, because of her size, speed and extra dependability of her two-reactor plant, had been chosen for the mission.

The actual mission was summarized by the USN's Dictionary of American Naval Fighting Ships:

Triton put to sea on her shakedown cruise on 15 February 1960, bound for the South Atlantic. She arrived in the middle Atlantic off St. Peter and St. Paul Rocks on 24 February to commence a history-making voyage. Having remained submerged since her departure from the east coast, Triton continued on south towards Cape Horn, rounded the tip of South America, and headed west across the Pacific. After transiting the Philippine and Indonesian archipelagos and crossing the Indian Ocean, she rounded the Cape of Good Hope and arrived off the St. Peter and Paul Rocks on 25 April – 60 days and 21 hours after departing the mid-ocean landmark. Only once did her sail break the surface of the sea, when she transferred a sick sailor to USS Macon (CA-132) off Montevideo, Uruguay, on 6 March. She arrived back at Groton, Connecticut, on 10 May, having completed the first submerged circumnavigation of the earth.

Triton's globe-girdling cruise proved invaluable to the United States. Politically, it enhanced the nation's prestige. From an operational viewpoint, the cruise demonstrated the great submerged endurance and sustained high-speed transit capabilities of the first generation of nuclear-powered submarines. Moreover, during the voyage, the submarine collected reams of oceanographic data. At the cruise's conclusion, Triton received the Presidential Unit Citation and Captain Beach received the Legion of Merit from President Dwight D. Eisenhower.

Triton's commanding officer during Operation Sandblast, Captain Edward L. Beach, also provided a unique perspective on the circumnavigation in the published log:

The sea may yet hold the key to the salvation of man and his civilization. That the world may better understand this, the Navy directed a submerged retrace of Ferdinand Magellan's historic circumnavigation. The honor of doing it fell to Triton, but it has been a national accomplishment; for the sinews and the power which make up our ship, the genius which designed her, the thousands and hundreds of thousands who labored, each at his own metier, in all parts of the country, to build her safe, strong, self-reliant, are America. Triton, a unit of their Navy, pridefully and respectfully dedicates this voyage to the people of the United States.

Noted historian Bern Dibner placed the significance of Operation Sandblast into historical context:

The epochal achievement of the fleet of Magellan in circumnavigating the globe was echoed in the magnificent accomplishment by the nuclear submarine Triton in 1960. Like the voyage of Magellan, that of Triton created stirring philosophical concepts. It demonstrated that a company of men could live and work in the depth of the ocean for months at a time. It was shown that through the new technology a source of power had been made in such abundance and so manageable that, without refueling, an 8000-ton vehicle would be driven through the water around the world. It was also shown that the arts of observation, navigation, communication and control had reached the point where travel under the water was possible with pinpoint accuracy.

Also, in his 2000 book Ships of Discovery And Exploration, historian Lincoln P. Paine further noted:

Although the voyage had been conceived as a way for Eisenhower to impress Soviet General Secretary Nikita Khrushchev at the Paris summit, this conference was canceled after U-2 pilot Francis Gary Powers was shot down over the Soviet Union on 1 May. But coming less than two years after the transpolar expedition of USS Nautilus, Triton's accomplishment was a clear reaffirmation of U.S. technological supremacy.

The actual submerged circumnavigation occurred between 24 February and 25 April 1960, covering 26,723 nautical miles (49,491 km; 30,752 mi) in 60 days and 21 hours at the average speed of 18 knots (33 km/h; 21 mph) while crossing the Equator on four different occasions. Also, the total duration of Triton's shakedown cruise was 84 days 19 hours 8 minutes, covering 36,335.1 nautical miles (67,292.6 km; 41,813.7 mi), and Triton remained submerged for a total of 83 days 9 hours, covering 35,979.1 nautical miles (66,633.3 km; 41,404.0 mi) during her maiden voyage.

The New York Times described Triton's submerged circumnavigation of the world as "a triumph of human prowess and engineering skill, a feat which the United States Navy can rank as one of its bright victories in man's ultimate conquest of the seas".

=== Initial deployments ===
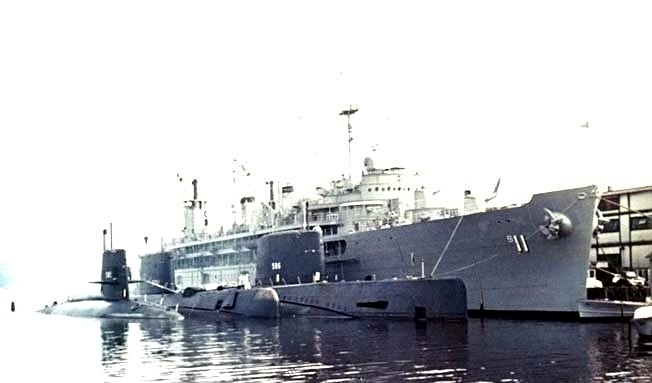
Skipjack, Nautilus, Triton, and the submarine tender Fulton at State Pier – New London, Connecticut (1962)

Following her post-shakedown availability, Triton assumed her duties as a radar picket submarine in August 1960. She deployed to northern European waters with the Second Fleet to participate in NATO exercises oriented around detecting and intercepting Soviet bombers flying over the Arctic. Triton also participated in NATO exercises against British naval forces led by the aircraft carriers Ark Royal and Hermes under the command of Rear Admiral Sir Charles Madden, RN. For 2 days during these NATO exercises, Rear Admiral Thomas H. Moorer and his flag lieutenant, Lt. William P. Lawrence, were aboard Triton to observe the submarine's radar picket operations. At the time, Moorer was serving as Commander Carrier Division Six, which included the carriers Essex and Saratoga. Triton completed her first overseas deployment with a port visit to Bremerhaven, West Germany, the first by a nuclear-powered vessel to a European port, from 2–9 October 1960, with an estimated 8,000 people touring the boat during this port call.

For the first half of 1961, Triton conducted operational patrols and training exercises with the Atlantic Fleet. This included an at-sea exercise involving low-power testing in support of the development of a proposed natural circulation reactor. She also deployed to monitor the Soviet 50-megaton hydrogen bomb initiation at Novaya Zemlya in the Arctic Ocean during late October 1961.

During this period, the rising threat posed by Soviet submarine forces increased the USN's demands for nuclear-powered attack submarines with antisubmarine warfare capability. Following the development of the carrier-based Grumman WF-2 Tracer airborne early warning aircraft, Triton's AN/SPS-26 3D long-range air search radar was no longer needed, and the development of the submarine version of this 3D radar system, the BPS-10, was canceled in 1960. Accordingly, upon the demise of the USN's radar picket submarine program, Triton was redesignated SSN-586 on 1 March 1961.

=== Overhaul and conversion ===
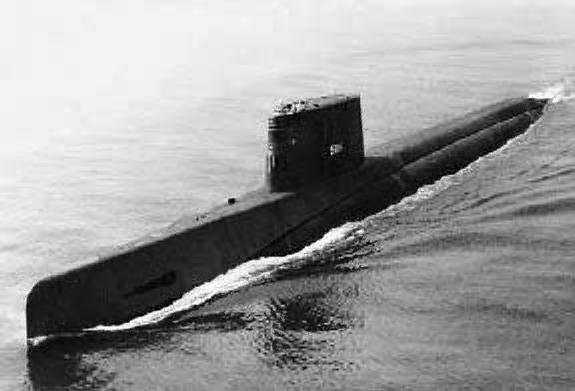
Triton post-overhaul, c. 1964

Triton entered the Portsmouth Naval Shipyard in June 1962 for conversion to an attack submarine. Her crew complement was reduced from 172 to 159. She was overhauled and refueled at Groton, Connecticut, from September 1962 to January 1964, which included modification to serve as the flagship for COMSUBLANT. Since the USN no longer had any plans to use Triton's radar picket capability, her SPS-26 radar set was replaced by a two-dimensional AN/BPS-2 air search radar, with Triton now providing the fleet with an at-sea air strike-control capability.

Because she subsequently served as COMSUBLANT's flagship following her overhaul, one area of continuing speculation is whether Triton was part of the National Emergency Command Post Afloat (NECPA) program, which was tasked to provide afloat facilities for the President of the United States in case of an emergency or war, with the command cruisers Northampton and Wright assigned to perform this mission.

Triton had a number of attributes that made her a potential NECPA platform. Her size allowed ample room for additional shipboard systems and personnel accommodations. Her designed speed provided the capability for rapid transit, and her nuclear power plant offered virtually unlimited endurance and range. The CIC provided substantial command-and-control capabilities, as did the communication buoy system that could receive and send radio transmissions while submerged. As she was a submarine, Triton offered superior protection against nuclear-biological-chemical contaminants over surface ships or an airborne command center. However, the record remains unclear if such an explicit NECPA conversion was ever undertaken for Triton.

=== Subsequent operations ===
In March 1964, upon completion of her overhaul, Triton's home port was changed from New London, to Norfolk. On 13 April 1964, she became the flagship for COMSUBLANT. On 20 January 1965, Triton rescued the pilot and a passenger of a charter aircraft that had ditched in the Atlantic Ocean off St. Croix in the Virgin Islands. Triton was relieved as COMSUBLANT's flagship by the Sturgeon-class submarine Ray on 1 June 1967. 11 days later, Triton was shifted to her original home port of New London, Connecticut.

== Decommissioning and final disposition ==
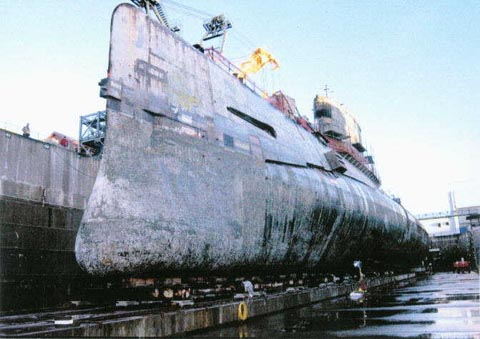
Triton in dry dock at the Puget Sound Naval Shipyard, November 2007

Due to cutbacks in defense spending, as well as the expense of operating her twin nuclear reactors, Triton's scheduled 1967 overhaul was canceled, and the submarine – along with 60 other vessels – was slated for inactivation. While Triton's twin reactor plant was designed to be refueled by a submarine tender like other U.S. nuclear submarines, because of the complexity of her zirconium-clad fuel elements, Triton's previous re-fueling had been done in a shipyard during her 1962–1964 overhaul. Although new fuel elements were procured and available for installation, Triton's overhaul was canceled, a source of controversy. One speculation suggests that the cancellation of Triton's overhaul allowed funds to be redirected for the repairs to the supercarrier Forrestal, which had been extensively damaged off Vietnam. From October 1968 through May 1969, she underwent preservation and deactivation processes, and she was decommissioned on 3 May 1969. Triton became the U.S. Navy's first nuclear-powered submarine to be taken out of service, and second in the world, after the Soviet Navy's November-class submarine K-27 in 1968. On 6 May 1969, Triton departed New London under tow and proceeded to Norfolk, Virginia, where she was placed in the reserve fleet. She remained berthed at Norfolk or at the St. Julien's Creek Annex of Norfolk Naval Shipyard in Portsmouth, Virginia, into 1993. She was stricken from the Naval Vessel Registry on 30 April 1986. In August 1993, the hulks of the ex-Triton and the ex-Ray were towed by the salvage tug Bolster to the Puget Sound Naval Shipyard (PSNS), in Bremerton, Washington, arriving on 3 September 1993, to await their turn in the Nuclear Powered Ship and Submarine Recycling Program (SRP).

Effective 1 October 2007, ex-Triton landed on the keel resting blocks in the drydock basin to begin recycling (pictured). The long delay in the disposal of ex-Triton has been attributed to the complexity of her dual reactor plant. Final recycling was completed effective 30 November 2009.

== Honors and awards ==
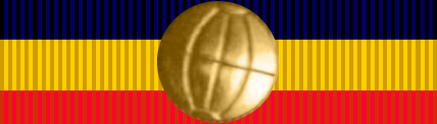

Presidential Unit Citation with Operation Sandblast device	Navy Unit Commendation

=== Presidential Unit Citation ===
On 10 May 1960, Secretary of the Navy William B. Franke presented the Presidential Unit Citation (PUC) to Triton for Operation Sandblast, the first submerged circumnavigation of the world. Chief Torpedoman's Mate Chester Raymond Fitzjarrald, the chief of the boat, accepted the PUC on behalf of Triton's officers and crew. The citation reads:

For meritorious achievement from 16 February 1960 to 10 May 1960. During this period the TRITON circumnavigated the earth submerged, generally following the route of Magellan's historic voyage. In addition to proving the ability of both crew and nuclear submarine to accomplish a mission which required almost three months of submergence, TRITON collected much data of scientific importance. The performance, determination and devotion to duty of the TRITON's crew were in keeping with the highest traditions of the naval service. All members of the crew who made this voyage are authorized to wear the Presidential Unit Citation ribbon with a special clasp in the form of a golden replica of the globe.

Up to that time, this was only the second time that a U.S. Navy vessel had been awarded the Presidential Unit Citation for a peacetime mission, with the nuclear submarine USS Nautilus (SSN-571) receiving the first peacetime PUC in recognition of Operation Sunshine, the first submerged voyage under the North Pole in 1958. To commemorate the first submerged circumnavigation of the world, all Triton personnel who made that voyage were authorized to wear their Presidential Unit Citation ribbon with a special clasp in the form of a golden replica of the globe (pictured).

=== Naval Unit Commendation ===
The citation reads:

For exceptionally meritorious service during a period in 1967. USS Triton conducted important and arduous independent submarine operations of great importance to the national defense of the United States. The outstanding results achieved during the highly successful operations attest to the exceptional professional skill, resourcefulness and ingenuity of Triton's officers and men. Their inspiring performance of duty throughout was in keeping with the highest traditions of the naval service.

== Legacy ==
The importance of the Triton goes beyond the specific military task which has been assigned her. The Triton, in her operations, will test an advanced type of nuclear propulsion plant and will pave the way for the submersible capital ships of the future.

— Vice Admiral Hyman G. Rickover, U.S. Navy (1959)

=== Triton plaque ===
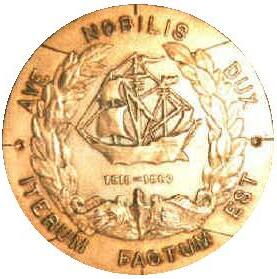
The Triton Plaque

In the eight days prior to Triton's departure on her around-the-world submerged voyage, Captain Beach approached Lt. Tom B. Thamm, Triton's Auxiliary Division Officer, to design a commemorative plaque for their upcoming voyage, as well as the first circumnavigation led by Portuguese explorer Ferdinand Magellan. The plaque's eventual design consisted of a brass disk about 23 inches (58 cm) in diameter, bearing a sailing ship reminiscent of Magellan's carrack, Trinidad, above the submarine dolphin insignia with the years 1519 and 1960 between them, all within a laurel wreath. Outside the wreath is the motto "AVE NOBILIS DUX, ITERUM FACTUM EST" ("Hail Noble Captain, it is Done Again").

Commodore Tom Henry, commanding Submarine Squadron 10, supervised the completion of the plaque. The carving of the wooden form was done by retired Chief Electrician's Mate Ernest L. Benson at New London. The actual molding of the plaque was done by the Mystic Foundry.

During the homeward leg of her around-the-world voyage, Triton rendezvoused with the destroyer John W. Weeks on 2 May 1960 off Cádiz, Spain, the departure point for Magellan's earlier voyage. Triton broached, and John W. Weeks transferred the finished plaque to Triton for transport back to the United States. The plaque was subsequently presented to the Spanish government by John Davis Lodge, the United States Ambassador to Spain. This plaque is located at the City Hall in Sanlúcar de Barrameda, Spain, and it is mounted on the wall of the city hall with a marble slab memorializing the 1960 Triton submerged circumnavigation.

Duplicates of the Triton Plaque were also presented to the Mystic Seaport Museum in Mystic, Connecticut, and the Naval Historical Association in Washington, D.C., as well as the U.S. Navy Submarine School and the U.S. Navy Submarine Force Library and Museum, both located in Groton, Connecticut.

=== Triton memorials ===
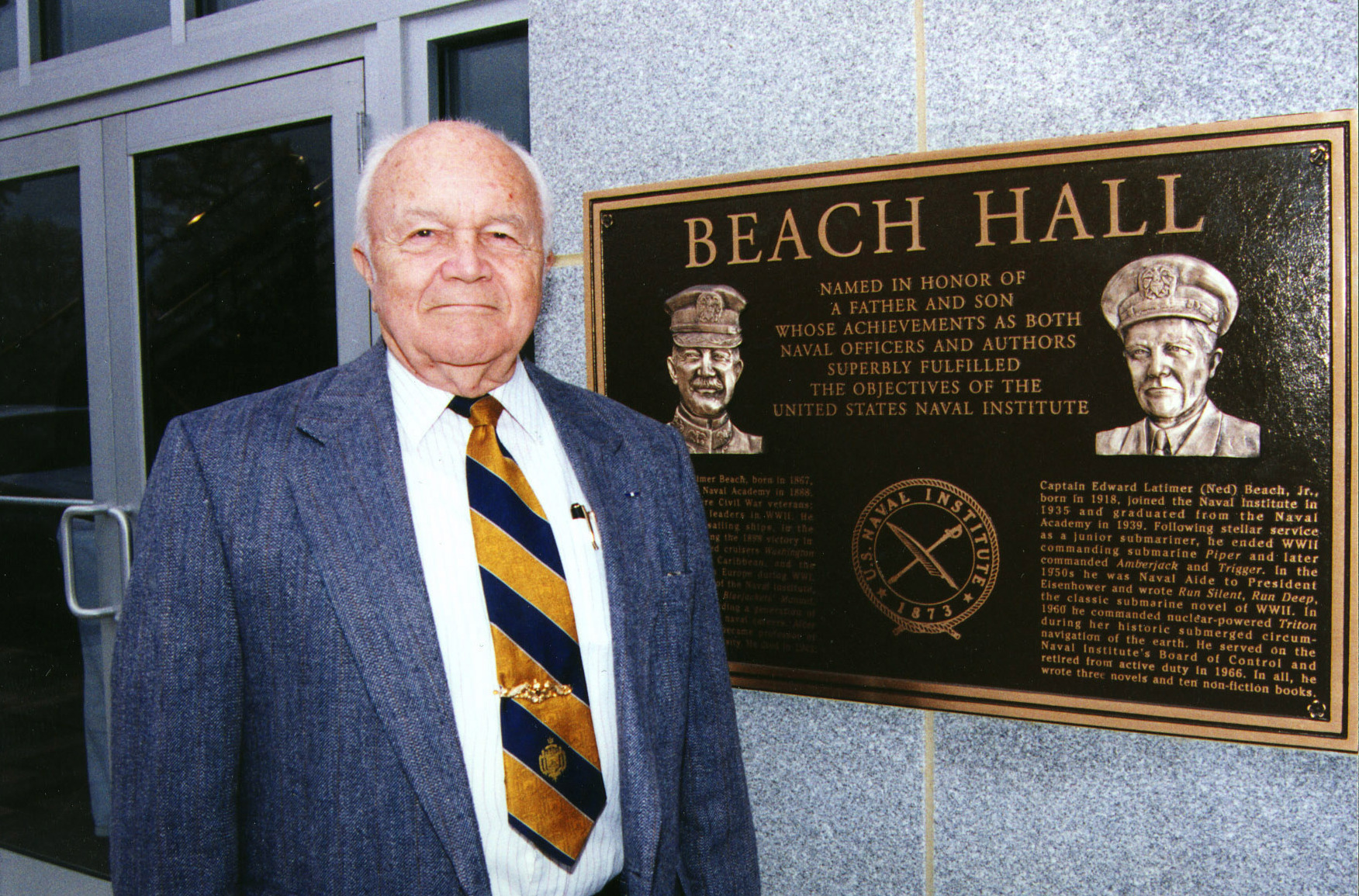
Captain Edward L. Beach at the dedication of Beach Hall (1999)

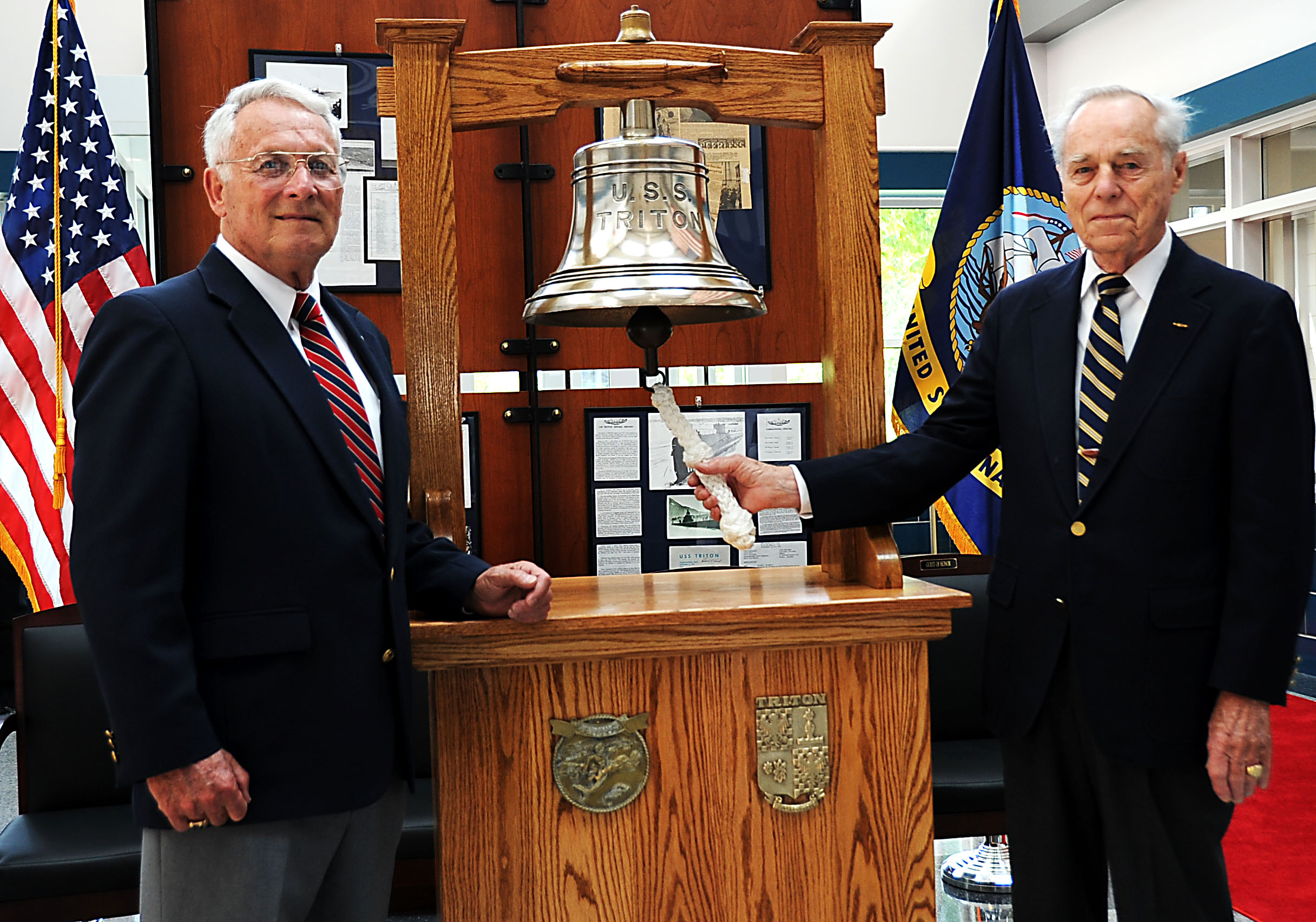
USS Triton bell dedication ceremony (17 May 2012)

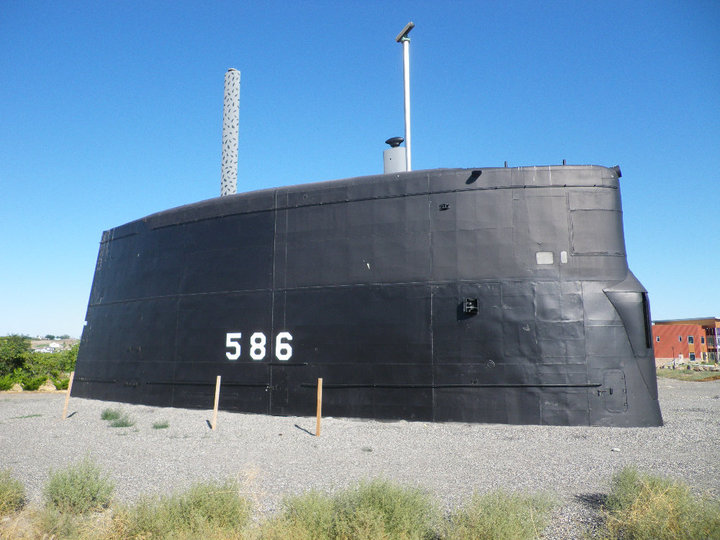
USS Triton Submarine Memorial Park

Triton Light is a navigational beacon on the seawall of the United States Naval Academy in Annapolis, Maryland, where the Severn River meets Spa Creek and the Annapolis harbor. It was donated to the Academy and named for the Greek god by the United States Naval Academy Class of 1945. The crew of Triton provided samples of water taken from the 22 seas through which their boat had sailed during their submerged 1960 circumnavigation. These samples filled a globe built into the Triton Light, and the naming of the light and significance of the globe are explained in a commemorative marker.

Beach Hall is the new headquarters for the United States Naval Institute which was dedicated on 21 April 1999 (pictured). The facility is named after Captain Edward L. Beach Sr., who served as the institute's secretary-treasurer, and his son, Edward L. Beach Jr., who commanded Triton during Operation Sandblast. The dive wheel from Triton's conning tower is on display in the lobby of Beach Hall.

Triton was the 2003 inductee into the Submarine Hall of Fame following her nomination by the Tidewater chapter and Hampton Roads Base of the United States Submarine Veterans, Inc. (USSVI). A shadow box filled with Triton memorabilia was placed in Alcorn Auditorium of Ramage Hall located at the U.S. Navy Submarine Learning Center, Naval Station Norfolk.

USS Triton Recruit Barracks (Ship 12) was dedicated in ceremonies at the U.S. Navy's Recruit Training Command, Naval Station Great Lakes, near North Chicago, Illinois, on 25 June 2004. The facility honors the memory of two submarines named Triton and includes memorabilia from both. Triton Hall is the fifth barracks constructed under the RTC Recapitalization Project, covering 172,000 square feet (15,979 square meters) in floor space. The facility is designed to accommodate 1056 recruits, and it includes berthing, classrooms, learning resource centers, a galley, a quarterdeck, and a modern HVAC system. On 17 May 2012, in a dedication ceremony, the long-missing ship's bell was added to the collection of artifacts in Recruit Training Command's USS Triton recruit barracks quarterdeck (pictured).

The USS Triton Submarine Memorial Park is located on the Columbia River, at the end of Port of Benton Boulevard in north Richland, Washington. Its purpose is "to establish a permanent park in north Richland in recognition of all the decommissioned reactor cores off-loaded at the Port's barge slip, transported and stored at the Hanford Site".

The park features Triton's sail superstructure (pictured) and an information display on the history of Triton. The park also serves as a tourist attraction, especially due to its location, since Hanford is the resting place of spent reactor cores from several Navy ships. Planning called for the sail to be cut up for transport and reassembled at the park site. Ground-breaking was initially scheduled to take place on 3 April 2008, with the dedication ceremony set for 19 August 2008 and a Fall 2009 start-date for construction. On 23 October 2009, the Port of Benton encased Triton's conning tower in concrete at its new USS Triton Submarine Memorial Park in north Richland, Washington. In mid-December 2009, the final pieces of Triton's sail were welded together at the park's site. During the 11 August 2010 Port of Benton commission meeting, it was reported that bids for the first phase, which includes the park's electrical lighting system and the pouring the concrete around Triton's sail, would be announced shortly by the port authority. The second phase would involve the park's landscaping, and the third phase would be the installation of a parking lot. The park is part of the Richland Riverfront Trail, a marked hiking trail that focuses on the state of Washington's contribution to the nuclear history of the United States, and it connects to the Sacagawea Heritage Trail. The USS Triton Submarine Memorial Park is located off George Washington Way near the Columbia River, and it was formally dedicated on 10 November 2011, the 52nd anniversary of the commissioning of the USS Triton.

In 2011, the USS Triton, Operation Sandblast, and Captain Edward L. Beach Jr., were included in the Technology for the Nuclear Age: Nuclear Propulsion display for the Cold War exhibit at the U.S. Navy Museum in Washington, D.C.

=== Cultural references ===
Triton's submerged circumnavigation, Operation Sandblast, was the subject of the ABC television series Expedition! broadcast on Tuesday, 14 February 1961. Hosted by John D. Craig, this episode was titled Saga of the Triton, and it featured film footage from Operation Sandblast with voice-over narration extracted from Captain Beach's logbook.

Triton is referenced briefly in three popular Cold War novels. In The Last Mayday by Keith Wheeler (1968), Triton is depicted as participating in a submarine training exercise at the beginning of the novel, with special notice made of her large, rectangular sail. In the 1978 novel Cold is the Sea by Edward L. Beach, the second sequel to his 1955 best-seller Run Silent, Run Deep, Triton is mentioned several times. Also, the under-ice towing capability that was considered for Triton served as a key plot point for the novel. Finally, in The Hunt for Red October by Tom Clancy, the biographical background for Marko Ramius mentions that, while commanding a Charlie-class submarine, Ramius had "hounded [Triton] mercilessly for twelve hours" in the Norwegian Sea. Subsequently, Ramius "would note with no small satisfaction that the Triton was soon thereafter retired, because, it was said, the oversized vessel had proven unable to deal with the newer Soviet designs".

Two films of the period, Voyage to the Bottom of the Sea and Around the World Under the Sea, dramatized globe-circling submerged voyages similar to Operation Sandblast. Also, in the teaser of the episode "Mutiny" of the Voyage to the Bottom of the Sea television series, broadcast on 11 January 1965, the fictional nuclear submarine Neptune is on her shakedown cruise, under the supervision of Admiral Harriman Nelson (Richard Basehart), and when the submarine's port shaft bearing begins overheating, Admiral Nelson orders a hose be rigged to cool the port shaft down with sea water, the same solution Admiral Rickover had suggested during Triton's sea trials.

The 1960 The Button-Down Mind of Bob Newhart comedy album included a sketch entitled "The Cruise of the U.S.S. Codfish" which was a monologue involving the final address by the captain to the crew of a nuclear-powered submarine after completing a two-year-long, around-the-world underwater voyage. Bob Newhart noted in a 2006 interview that:

You know, I think the Triton kind of, I think was a spur for that routine as I think back. Because I then imagined what a trip like that would have been like with a totally incompetent commander, and the "Cruise of the USS Codfish" was the final result.

Captain Beach reportedly played "The Cruise of the U.S.S. Codfish" over the ship's public address system during Triton's first overseas deployment in the Fall of 1960.

Antigua-Barbuda issued a commemorative stamp of Triton's 1960 submerged circumnavigation. Also, Triton was the name of one of the submersibles featured in the Submarine Voyage attraction at Disneyland which operated from 1959 to 1998.

=== 50th anniversary of Operation Sandblast ===
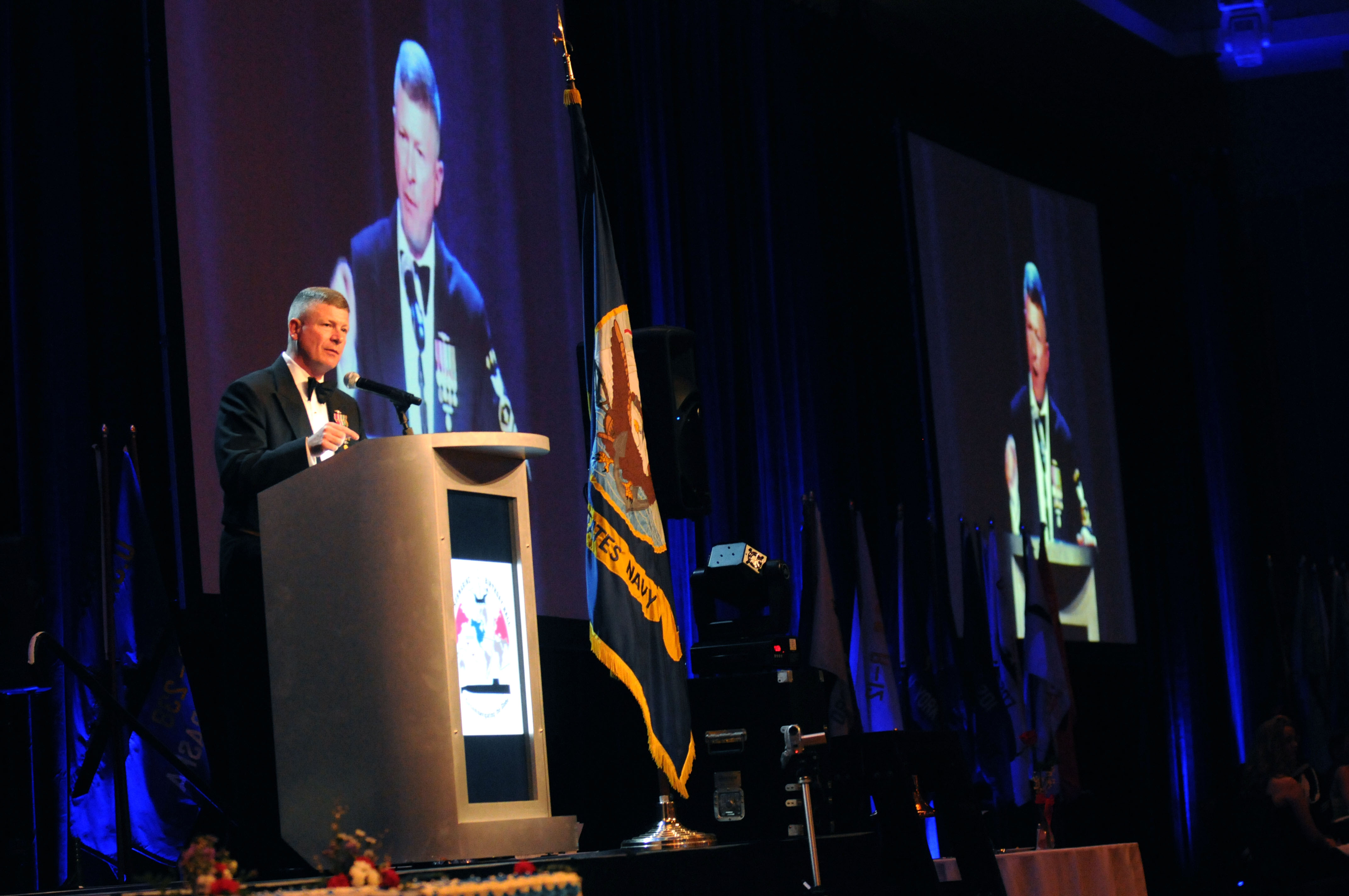
110th Submarine Ball (10 April 2010)

The 50th anniversary of Operation Sandblast and Triton's submerged circumnavigation of the world was celebrated on 10 April 2010, during the 2010 Submarine Birthday Ball held at the Foxwoods Resort Casino in Mashantuket, Connecticut, with Master Chief Petty Officer of the Navy (MCPON) Rick D. West delivering opening remarks (pictured) to the 2,200 attendees. The U.S. Navy Submarine Force Library and Museum sponsored additional events and activities, entitled "9,000 Leagues Under the Sea", between 10 and 12 April and 14–18 April 2010.

Also, on 9 April 2010, retired Admiral Henry G. Chiles Jr., who served in Triton from 1963 to 1966, was the keynote speaker at the graduation class of the Basic Enlisted Submarine School at the New London Naval Submarine Base in Groton, Connecticut. The graduation class was named in honor of Triton, and each graduate received a certificate of course completion and a commemorative coin celebrating the 50th anniversary of Triton's submerged circumnavigation. The Dolphin Scholarship Foundation used the 50th anniversary of Operation Sandblast to promote its Race Around the World fund-raising program to support its Dolphin Scholarship program. Finally, former members of Triton's crew received commemorative souvenirs of the ship's pressure hull at their 2010 re-union.

On 25 April 2010, the University of Texas Marine Science Institute posted a radio program article on its Science and the Sea web site commemorating Operation Sandblast and Triton.

For the 50th anniversary of Operation Sandblast, writer-historian Carl LaVO wrote "Incredible Voyage" for the June 2010 edition of Naval History magazine, and John Beach wrote "The First Submerged Circumnavigation" for the April 1960 issue of The Submarine Review, the official magazine of the Naval Submarine League. Mr. Beach is the nephew of Captain Edward L. Beach, the commanding officer of the USS Triton during Operation Sandblast. Finally, the Naval Institute Press published Beneath the Waves by Dr. Edward F. Finch, a 2010 biography of the late Captain Beach, which includes extensive coverage of Operation Sandblast.

The legacy of Operation Sandblast on its 50th anniversary was summarized by retired Captain James C. Hay who had served on Triton during the historic submerged around-the-world voyage. On the editorial page of the April 1960 issue of The Submarine Review, the official magazine of the Naval Submarine League, Captain Hay noted:

It is truly a cruise which tested the crew's mettle and proved the skipper's tenacity. More than that, however, it again proved to all who cared to listen that the U.S. Navy could go anywhere, at any time, and do what ever was required. It's a good sea story about doing what had to be done. On the fiftieth anniversary of the First Submerged Circumnavigation it's a good thing to do to re-read about one of the forerunners of all we're done since.

== Bibliography ==
- Beach, Edward L. (2001) [1962]. Around the World Submerged: The Voyage of the Triton (First (paperback) ed.). New York: Holt, Rinehart and Winston. ISBN 978-1-55750-215-5. LCCN 62-18406.
- —— (1999). Salt and Steel: Reflections of Submariner. Annapolis: Naval Institute Press. ISBN 978-1-55750-054-0.
- Dibner, Bern (1964). Victoria and the Triton. New York: Blaisdell Publishing.
- "Edward L. Beach Papers" (PDF). Abilene, Kansas: Dwight D. Eisenhower Presidential Library and Museum. 1953–1961. Archived from the original (PDF) on 21 July 2011.
- Finch, Edward F. (2010). Beneath the Waves: The Life and Navy of Capt. Edward L. Beach, Jr. Annapolis, Maryland: Naval Institute Press. ISBN 978-1-59114-266-9. Archived from the original on 13 July 2010.
- Friedman, Norman (1994). U.S. Submarines since 1945: An Illustrated Design History. Annapolis: Naval Institute Press. ISBN 978-1-55750-260-5.
- Largess, Robert P.; Horwitz, Harvey S. (1993). "USS Triton: The Ultimate Submersible". In Gardiner, Robert (ed.). Warship 1993. London: Conway Maritime Press. pp. 167–187. ISBN 978-0-85177-624-8. OCLC 30209229.
- Polmar, Norman (1993). The Naval Institute Guide to the Ships and Aircraft of the U.S. Fleet (15th ed.). Annapolis: Naval Institute Press. ISBN 1-55750-675-2.
- ——; Moore, J.K. (2004). Cold War Submarines: The Design and Construction of U.S. and Soviet Submarines (Paperback ed.). Washington, DC: Potomac Books. ISBN 978-1-57488-530-9. Archived from the original on 28 January 2015.
- USS Triton SSRN-586: First Submerged Circumnavigation 1960. Washington, DC: US Government Printing Office. 1960. O–550280.
