= USS Sailfish (SSR-572) =

Submarine of the United States

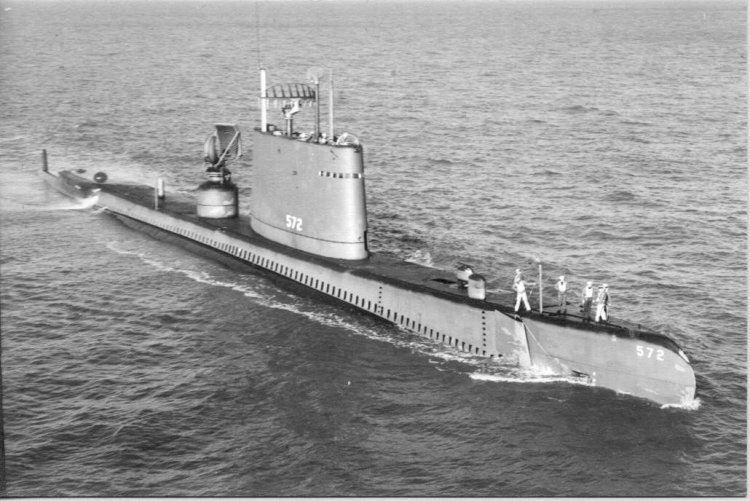
- USS Sailfish (SSR-572)

History

United States
- Name: USS Sailfish
- Namesake: Sailfish
- Ordered: 10 March 1951
- Builder: Portsmouth Naval Shipyard, Kittery, Maine
- Laid down: 8 December 1953
- Launched: 8 September 1955
- Commissioned: 14 April 1956, as SSR-572
- Decommissioned: 29 September 1978
- Reclassified: SS-572 (Attack submarine), 3 February 1961
- Stricken: 30 September 1978
- Fate: Sunk as target, May 2007

General characteristics
- Class & type: Sailfish-class submarine
- Displacement: 2,030 long tons (2,063 t) light; 2,334 long tons (2,371 t) surfaced; 3,168 long tons (3,219 t) submerged
- Length: 350 ft (110 m)
- Beam: 29 ft 1 in (8.86 m)
- Draft: 16 ft 4 in (5 m)
- Propulsion: Diesel-electric, 2 screws
- Speed: 20.5 knots (38.0 km/h; 23.6 mph) surfaced; 15 knots (28 km/h; 17 mph) submerged
- Complement: 95 officers and men
- Armament: 6 × 21 inch (533 mm) torpedo tubes

USS Sailfish (SSR/SS/AGSS-572), the lead ship of her class of submarine, was the second ship of the United States Navy to be named for the sailfish, a large gamefish inhabiting tropical seas, related to the swordfish, but possessing scales and a large sail-like dorsal fin.

== Construction and commissioning ==
Sailfish was the first submarine built expressly for radar picket service, and was equipped with BPS-2 and BPS-3 radars in and aft of the sail. She and her sister ship, Salmon, were the largest conventionally-powered submarines in the United States Navy since Argonaut of 1928. Designed to scout in advance of carrier groups using long-range radar, the Sailfish class were designed for a high surface speed. However, their speed achieved was not significantly faster than converted World War II radar picket submarines.

Sailfish was laid down on 8 December 1953 by the Portsmouth Naval Shipyard at Kittery, Maine. She was launched on 8 September 1955, sponsored by Mrs. Lynde D. McCormick, wife of Admiral Lynde D. McCormick, and commissioned on 14 April 1956.

== Service history ==
=== 1956–1960 ===
Following trials off the New Hampshire coast, Sailfish conducted a shakedown cruise in the Caribbean Sea before joining Submarine Squadron (SubRon) 6 at Norfolk, Virginia. In July 1957, she began her first extended deployment with Sixth Fleet in the Mediterranean Sea. She returned to Norfolk in October and, through the fall of 1958, engaged in local operations, with occasional visits to Caribbean ports. In December, she commenced a seven-month conversion and overhaul at Philadelphia. In April 1959, while the yard work was still in progress, she was transferred to SubRon 10 at New London, Connecticut. Sailfish resumed coastal operations out of New London in July, participating in fleet and NATO exercises, providing qualification training for prospective submarine officers and crews, and sharpening her own battle readiness.

=== 1961–1967 ===
On 3 February 1961, Sailfish was reclassified an attack submarine and given hull classification symbol SS-572, as the submarine radar picket mission ended fleetwide. Airborne radar had superseded it with the full deployment of the Grumman WF-2 Tracer. Over Thanksgiving weekend in 1961 she was dispersed from New London to Rhode Island and while in port there a fire in the deep fat fryer caused significant damage burning nearly all of the cables running through the after battery compartment. She returned to New London at the end of that weekend and the entire crew worked around the clock for five straight days replacing all of the cables. As a result, Sailfish was able to complete an exercise previous assigned by getting underway just six days after the fire. In January 1962 Sailfish entered the Philadelphia Naval Shipyard for overhaul. By September 1962, she was preparing for her second Mediterranean deployment and departed New London on 10 October. She operated with Sixth Fleet over the next four months and returned to New London in February 1963, where she participated in local operations through the rest of that year and 1964.

In January 1965, Sailfish was transferred to Philadelphia, Pennsylvania, where she entered the Philadelphia Naval Shipyard for an extensive "FRAM II" conversion. Thirteen months later, in February 1966, she left the navy yard presenting a more sleek, streamlined appearance, broken only by the deck mounted fins of the new PUFFS sonar system. Her large search radar had been removed. These new fins duplicated on a miniature scale the form of her conning tower, giving her the dorsaled look of a large, beautiful fish, like the sailfish for which she was named. Following an exhaustive checkout of her newly acquired systems and a period of refresher training, she deployed in July for her third Mediterranean tour. After four months, she returned to New London and local operations.

=== 1967–1978 ===
On 1 November 1967, she was assigned to SubRon 8 and joined the submarines of Submarine Division (SubDiv) 82, specialists in antisubmarine warfare. She operated out of Groton, Connecticut, until July 1968, then underwent overhaul into February 1969. On 1 July, she was ordered to the Pacific and assigned a new home port, Pearl Harbor. Sailfish departed New London on 14 July; transited the Panama Canal; and, after a brief visit to Acapulco, Mexico, proceeded to Hawaii. From Pearl Harbor, she sailed on 9 October for deployment with Seventh Fleet in the western Pacific. Sailfish operated out of Yokosuka, Japan. In January 1970, she participated in Allied exercises off Taiwan and Okinawa; in February, she conducted joint training operations with units of the Navy of the Republic of Korea; and, in March, she operated with units of the Japan Maritime Self-Defense Force. On 26 May, Sailfish returned to Pearl Harbor and spent the remainder of the year there in training operations and upkeep.

On 8 February 1971, Sailfish departed Pearl Harbor for her second WestPac deployment. For over six months, she cruised the western Pacific. In late May she joined units of the United States Navy and of the Japan Maritime Self-Defense Force in HUK ASWEX 3-71. By mid-July, she was in the Mindanao Sea participating in another antisubmarine exercise, this time with units of the Philippine Navy. Sailfish spent a week in Brisbane, Australia, before returning to Pearl Harbor, on 28 August, for overhaul.

The submarine underwent regular overhaul from 20 October 1971 until 14 July 1972. Between July and December, she operated between Hawaii and the California coast, engaged in trials and type training. On 1 December, Sailfish departed San Diego, California, for Yokosuka, Japan, and her third WestPac cruise. She plied the waters of the western Pacific until 4 May 1973, when she departed Subic Bay to return to the United States. She stopped overnight 19/20 May at Pearl Harbor, then continued on to San Diego. For the rest of 1973, she operated off the California coast out of San Diego.

=== Decommissioning and fate ===
Sailfish was decommissioned on 29 September 1978 and stricken from the Naval Vessel Register the next day. She was to be disposed of by the Security Assistance Program for cash sale to the Bolivian Navy, but remained berthed at the Naval Inactive Ship Maintenance Facility at Bremerton, Washington, after the fall of the Torrelio government in August 1982. In May 2007 Sailfish was expended as a target in a Fleet Training SINKEX, when a Mark 48 ADCAP torpedo fired from the submarine Topeka sent her to the bottom at 47°05′47″N 127°23′08″W, 121.2 nautical miles (224.5 km; 139.5 mi) off the coast of Washington at a depth of 1,451 fathoms (8,706 ft; 2,654 m).
