= S3G (disambiguation) =

S3G may refer to:

- S3G reactor : A naval reactor used by the US Navy.
- S3G, a diode electrical component
