= S4G reactor =

Naval reactor used by the United States Navy

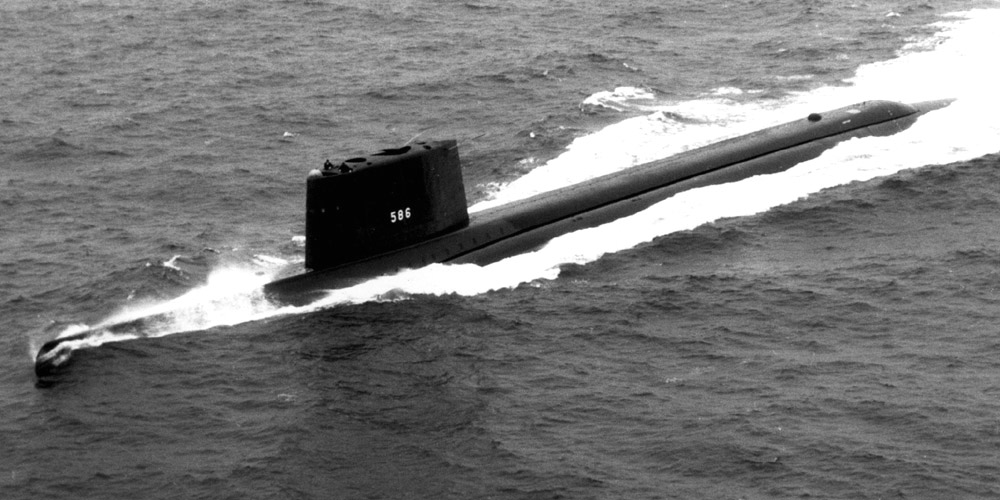
USS Triton

The S4G reactor is a naval pressurized water reactor used by the United States Navy to provide electricity generation and propulsion on warships. The S4G designation stands for:

- S = Submarine platform
- 4 = Fourth generation core designed by the contractor
- G = General Electric was the contracted designer

This nuclear reactor is the shipboard equivalent of the S3G reactor. It was installed in a dual-configuration on USS Triton with two reactors and two five-blade propellers, which was the first ship to make a submerged circumnavigation of the world. As installed in USS Triton the two S4G's were rated for a combined 78 MW (105,000 hp).
