= Submarine Memorial Chapel =

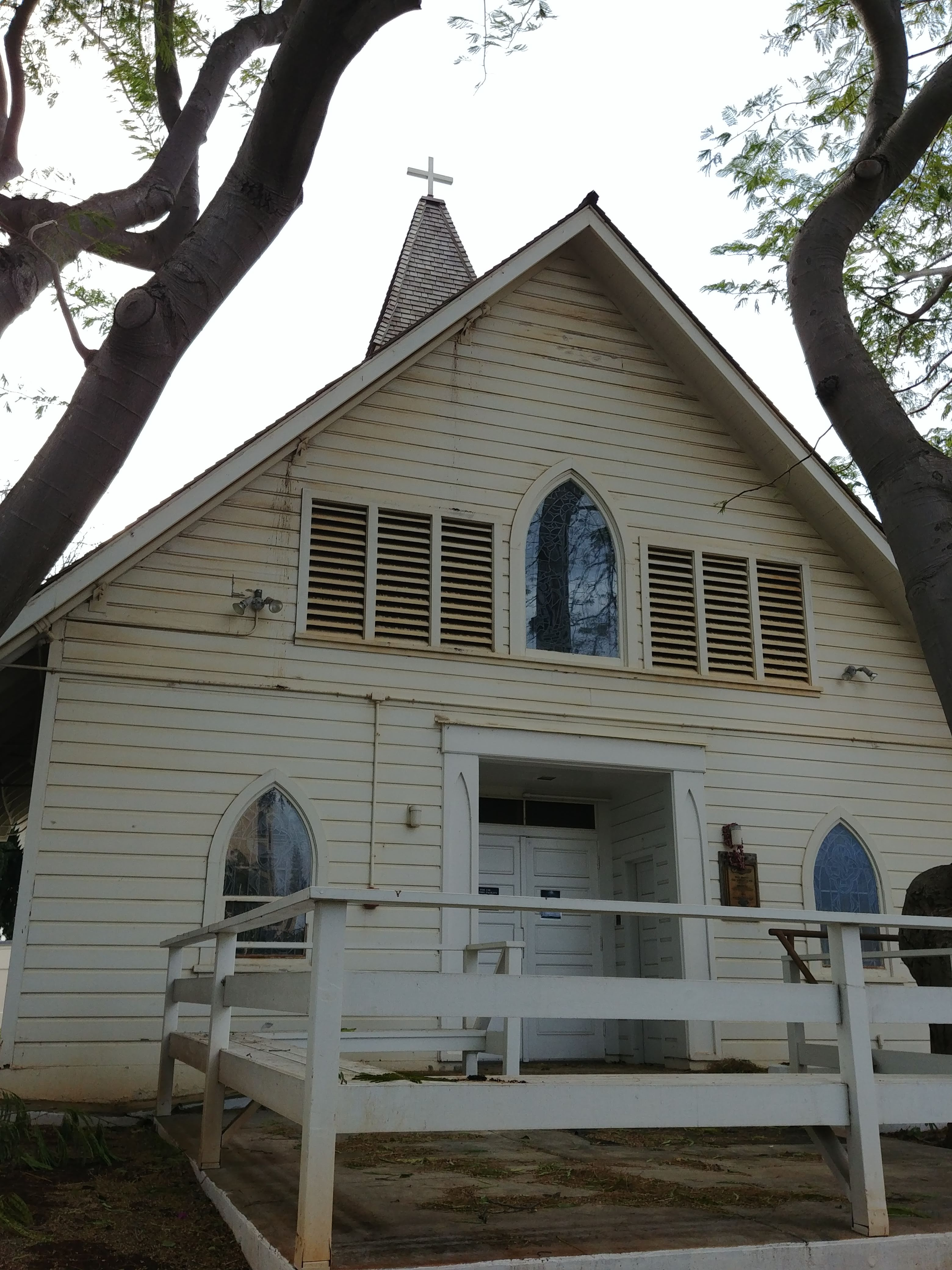
- Exterior of Submarine Memorial Chapel (2019)
- Interactive map of the Submarine Memorial Chapel area

General information
- Type: Church
- Location: Corner of Oakley and Nimitz Streets, Joint Base Pearl Harbor–Hickam, Pearl Harbor, Hawaii, United States
- Coordinates: 21°21′19″N 157°56′31″W
- Construction started: c. November 1943
- Inaugurated: September 10, 1944
- Owner: United States Navy

Height
- Height: c. 10 m (33 ft)

The Submarine Memorial Chapel is a military chapel onboard Joint Base Pearl Harbor–Hickam, Hawaii, United States. Dedicated in 1944, it is the oldest chapel at Pearl Harbor, built in remembrance of all the submariners who died in World War II. It ceased hosting religious worship services sometime in the 2000s, but regular religious services were re-established by a congregation at the chapel in 2015.

== History ==
The Submarine Memorial Chapel is the oldest chapel at Pearl Harbor, Hawaii, built during World War II in remembrance of all the submariners who died in that conflict. In November 1943, Navy Chaplain Lieutenant Commander Thomas H. Reilly conceived of the building and began to organize volunteers to build it.

The dedication ceremony on September 10, 1944, was attended by more than 400 personnel, including Admiral Chester Nimitz and then-Rear Admiral Charles A. Lockwood.

At some point in the early 2000s, the chapel ceased hosting religious worship services, but it continued to be the site of community activities including retirements, weddings, the monthly Tolling of the Boats and other services. On November 22, 2015, regular religious services were re-established by a congregation at the chapel.

== Features ==
=== Stained glass ===
The chapel has fourteen stained glass windows at ground level, one over the main door and another over the chancel. They were donated to the Navy by the president of submarine manufacturer Electric Boat Company in 1959. From inside the chapel, a small submarine may be seen in the lower portion of each window.

=== Ship's bell ===
The chapel's steeple contains the ship's bell from USS Argonaut, donated just before the submarine put to sea for her 1943 cruise on which she was sunk.

== Tolling of the Boats ==
A bell-tolling ceremony, the "Tolling of the Boats", is held at the chapel every month in remembrance of the submariners killed from the 52 United States Navy submarines lost during World War II. The ceremony was initiated by the organization United States Submarine Veterans of World War II, and is a solemn occasion at which "the names of each of the U.S. submarines lost, along with the fate of its crew, are read aloud as a bell is tolled for each in turn". At other bases the tolling of the boats may be held less frequently, for instance on Memorial Day, and may include boats lost before and after World War II.

== Gallery ==
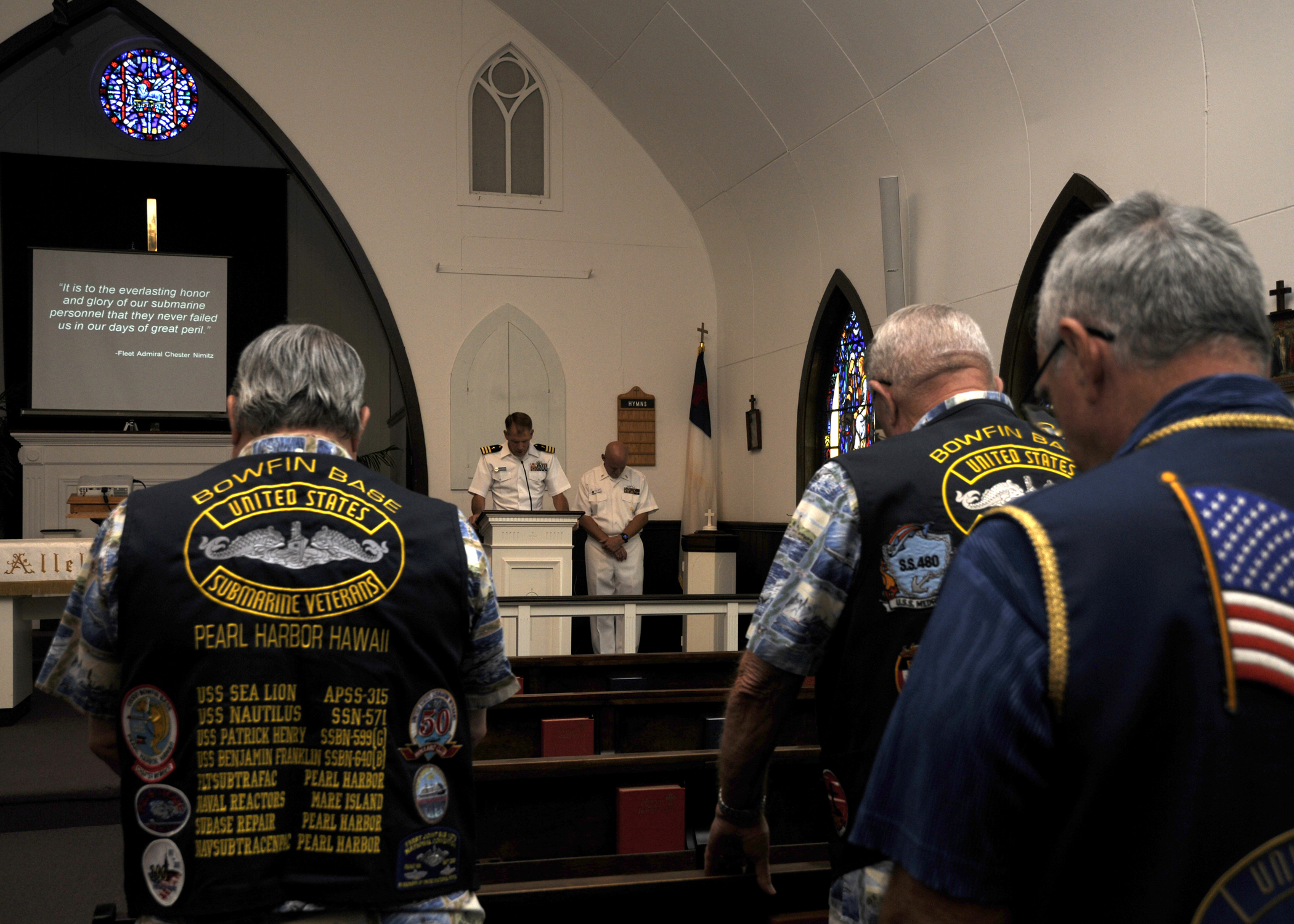
Chapel interior, showing two of the stained glass windows

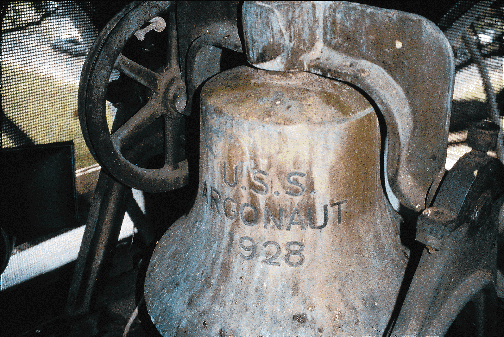
The ship's bell of USS Argonaut – lost in combat in 1943 – is in the chapel's steeple

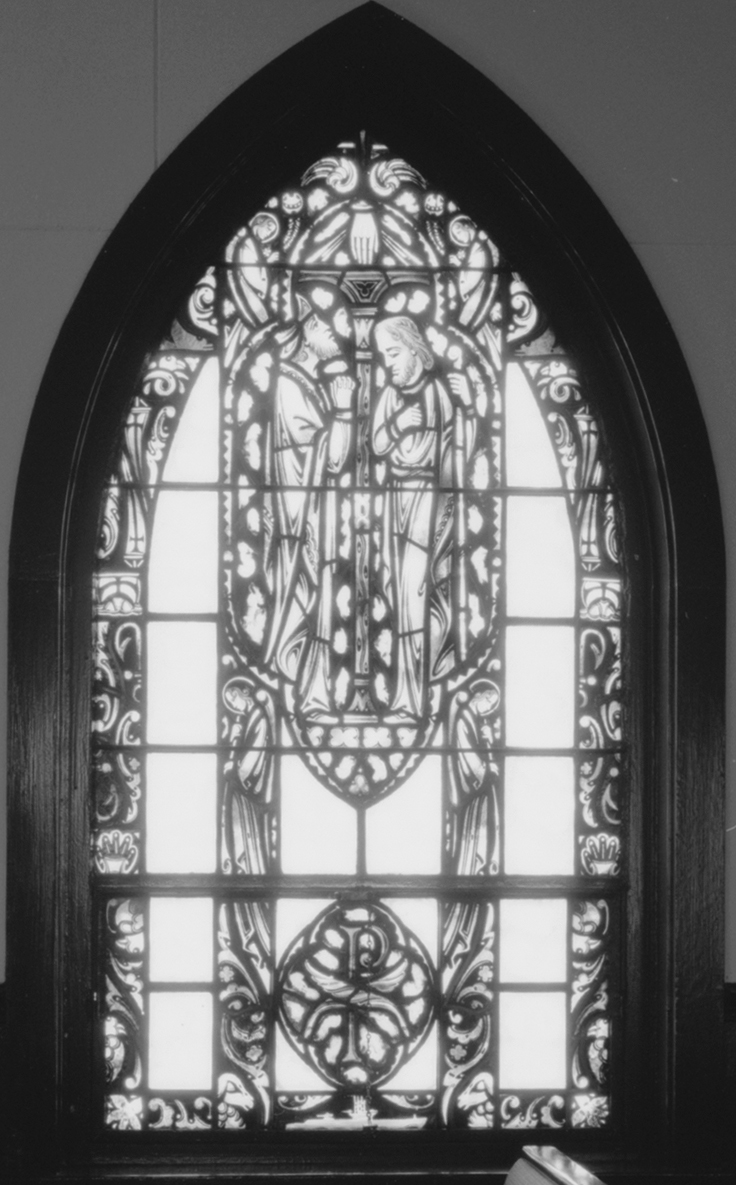
Miniature submarine in lower portion of stained glass window

== See also ==
- Naval Submarine Base Pearl Harbor
- US Naval Advance Bases
- USS Arizona Memorial
- Pearl Harbor National Memorial
- Pearl Harbor Survivors Association
