= Sailfish-class submarine =

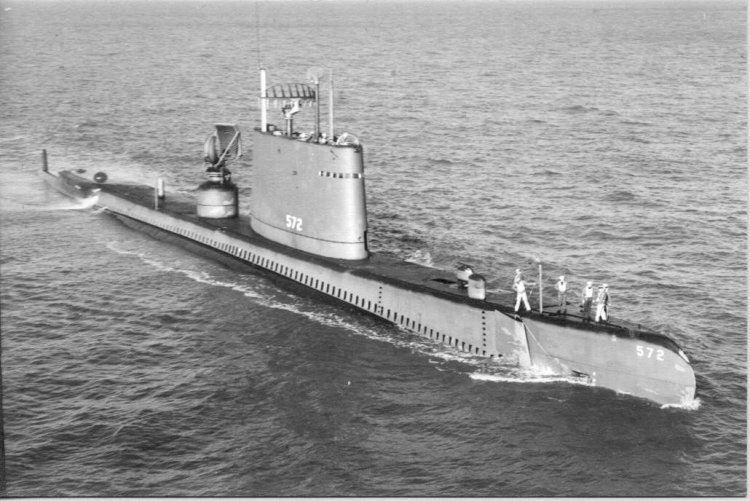
- USS Sailfish (SSR-572)

Class overview
- Builders: Portsmouth Naval Shipyard, Kittery, Maine
- Operators: United States Navy
- Built: 1953–1956
- In commission: 1956–1978
- Planned: 2
- Completed: 2
- Retired: 2

General characteristics
- Type: Radar picket submarine
- Displacement: 1,990 long tons (2,022 t) light; 2,334 long tons (2,371 t) surfaced; 3,168 long tons (3,219 t) submerged
- Length: 350 ft 6 in (106.83 m)
- Beam: 29 ft 1 in (8.86 m)
- Draft: 16 ft 4 in (5 m)
- Propulsion: 4 × Fairbanks-Morse Diesel engines (total 6,000 shp (4,500 kW)), 2 × Elliott electric motors (total 8,200 shp (6,100 kW)), 2 × 126-cell Sargo II batteries, 2 shafts
- Speed: 20.5 knots (38.0 km/h; 23.6 mph) surfaced; 15 knots (28 km/h; 17 mph) submerged
- Complement: 95 officers and men
- Armament: 6 × 21-inch (533 mm) torpedo tubes (bow), 18 torpedoes

The Sailfish-class submarines of the United States Navy, launched in 1955–1956, were the first submarines to be built expressly for radar picket service and, at the time, were the largest conventionally powered submarines in the United States Navy. Only USS Argonaut and the Narwhal-class submarines from the 1920s were larger. The Sailfishes were initially equipped with large BPS-2 and BPS-3 radars in and aft of the sail. They were designed under project SCB 84 for a high surface speed; however, their speed achieved was not significantly faster than converted World War II radar picket submarines. Commissioned in 1956, they served in the radar picket role until early 1961, when the submarine radar picket mission ended fleetwide. Airborne radar had superseded it with the deployment of the Grumman WF-2 Tracer. Modernized under the Fleet Rehabilitation and Modernization II (FRAM II) program 1964–1966, both submarines served until decommissioning in the late 1970s.

== Design ==
This class was an attempt to improve on the speed and surfaced seakeeping qualities of the converted World War II submarines previously used as radar pickets. They were equipped with a BPS-2 air search radar in the sail and a BPS-3 height finder on a pedestal aft of the sail. Despite a 6,000 shp (4,500 kW) diesel plant, their surfaced speed was only a few knots more than the effective speed of their smaller predecessors, so they were incapable of effectively escorting carrier task forces. After the submarine radar picket role ended in 1961, they were reclassified as attack submarines (SS). In 1964-66 they were modernized under the FRAM II program, with Salmon temporarily receiving Regulus missile guidance equipment. Both received BQG-4 PUFFS fire control sonar at this time.

== Ships in class ==
| Name | Hull number | Builder | Laid Down | Launched | Commissioned | Decommissioned | Period of service | Fate |
|---|---|---|---|---|---|---|---|---|
| Sailfish | SSR-572 | Portsmouth Naval Shipyard | 8 December 1953 | 7 September 1955 | 14 April 1956 | 29 September 1978 | 22.4 | Redesignated SS-572 3 February 1962, expended as a target May 2007 |
| Salmon | SSR-573 | Portsmouth Naval Shipyard | 10 March 1954 | 25 February 1956 | 30 August 1958 | 1 October 1977 | 19.1 | Redesignated SS-573 1 March 1961, expended as a target 5 June 1993 |
