= USS Salmon (SSR-573) =

Navy to be named for the salmon

Coordinates: 40.4229°N 73.6811°W

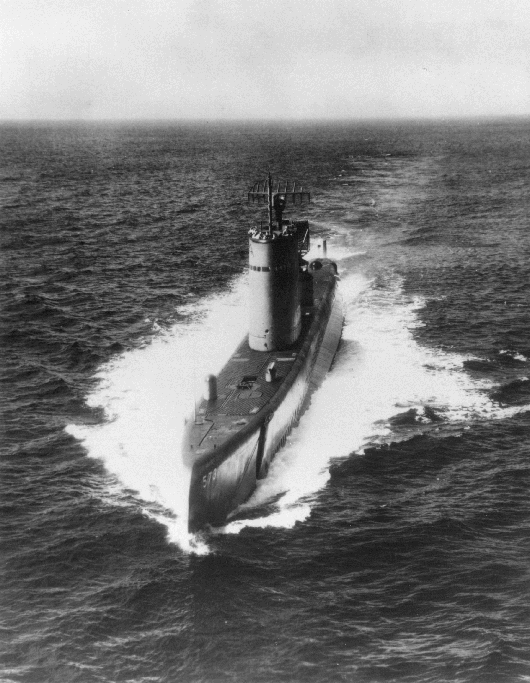
- USS Salmon (SSR-573)

History

United States
- Name: USS Salmon
- Namesake: Salmon
- Awarded: 27 February 1952
- Builder: Portsmouth Naval Shipyard, Kittery, Maine
- Laid down: 10 March 1954
- Launched: 25 February 1956
- Commissioned: 25 August 1956, as SSR-573
- Decommissioned: 1 October 1977
- Reclassified: SS-573 (Attack submarine), 1 March 1961; AGSS-573 (Auxiliary Research submarine), 1 June 1968; SS-573 (Attack submarine), 30 June 1969
- Stricken: 1 October 1977
- Fate: Sunk as a bottom target, 5 June 1993

General characteristics
- Class & type: Sailfish-class submarine
- Displacement: 2,030 long tons (2,063 t) light; 2,530 long tons (2,571 t) full
- Length: 350 ft (110 m)
- Beam: 25 ft (7.6 m) waterline; 30 ft (9.1 m) extreme
- Draft: 18 ft (5.5 m)
- Propulsion: Diesel-electric, 2 screws
- Speed: 20.5 knots (38.0 km/h; 23.6 mph) surfaced; 15 knots (28 km/h; 17 mph) submerged
- Complement: 12 officers, 73 men
- Armament: 6 × 21 inch (533 mm) torpedo tubes

USS Salmon (SSR/SS/AGSS-573), a Sailfish-class submarine, was the third ship of the United States Navy to be named for the salmon.

== Construction and commissioning ==
Salmon was the second of a class of two radar picket submarines, which were the largest conventionally-powered submarines in the United States Navy since the USS Argonaut (SM-1) of 1928. She was equipped with BPS-2 and BPS-3 radars in and aft of the sail. Intended to scout in advance of aircraft carrier groups using long-range radar, the Sailfish class were designed for a high surface speed. However, they achieved a speed only a few knots higher than converted World War II radar picket submarines.

Salmon was laid down on 10 March 1954 by the Portsmouth Naval Shipyard of Kittery, Maine. She was launched on 25 February 1956, sponsored by Mrs. Albert M. Bontier, widow of Commander A. M. Bontier, who was lost during World War II when the submarine USS Seawolf (SS-197) was sunk during a war patrol in the South Pacific early in October 1944. Salmon was commissioned on 26 August 1956.

== Service history ==
=== 1956–1959 ===
Salmon conducted her shakedown cruise between 19 February and 10 May 1957, ranging from Newport, Rhode Island, to Guantanamo Bay, Cuba. She departed Portsmouth for the West Coast in late May, transited the Panama Canal on 3 July; visited Callao, Peru; and proceeded to San Diego, California, arriving on 25 July.

Salmon conducted local operations in southern California waters, as a unit of Submarine Division 33 (SubDiv 33), until she began her first western Pacific deployment on 23 September. She sailed via Pearl Harbor and Midway Island to join the Seventh Fleet off southern Japan on 19 October. For the remainder of the year she participated in fleet training exercises and special operations, with port calls at Yokosuka, Japan; Hong Kong; Manila and Subic Bay, Philippines; and Kaohsiung, Taiwan. Salmon departed Yokosuka on 31 March 1958 and returned to San Diego, California, on 19 April.

Resuming local operations, Salmon remained in the San Diego area for the rest of the year. From 6 January 1959 until 30 May, she underwent overhaul and limited conversion at Mare Island Naval Shipyard. Giving up a large radome from her superstructure, she gained instrumented Regulus missileguidance capability and improved, longer range sonar. Salmon then prepared for her second WestPac deployment.

Salmon departed San Diego, California, on 17 July and sailed to Pearl Harbor where her crew received Regulus missile guidance training, then proceeded to Japan and joined Seventh Fleet on 21 August. She operated with the fleet in Allied training exercises, provided services for other Seventh Fleet surface and subsurface units for training purposes, and made visits to various ports, before returning to San Diego on 14 February 1960.

=== 1960–1970 ===
Through 1960 and 1961, Salmon operated from San Diego, California, with occasional visits to San Francisco, California, Astoria, Oregon, Tacoma, Washington, Port Angeles, Washington, and Esquimalt, British Columbia. On 1 March 1961, she was reclassified an attack submarine and given hull classification symbol SS-573, and, on 1 November, she was reassigned to SubDiv 52. The submarine radar picket mission ended fleetwide at this time as airborne radar superseded it with the full deployment of the Grumman WF-2 Tracer.

On 1 June 1962, Salmon departed San Diego for her third WestPac deployment. She visited Papeete, Tahiti, from 13 to 16 June, then proceeded to Yokosuka for duty with Seventh Fleet. She subsequently operated with antisubmarine warfare (ASW) hunter-killer groups in fleet exercises and often engaged in free-play battle problems with individual surface units. During this deployment, she visited Hakodate and Sasebo, Japan; Naha, Okinawa and Hong Kong. Salmon returned to San Diego, California, on 20 December and became flagship of Submarine Flotilla 1; and, in addition to that distinction, was awarded the Golden "E" for excellence in battle efficiency for the past five consecutive years, which rated her as the leading submarine of her division. Salmon was the first submarine to earn a Golden "E" and was to better that record by winning hashmarks signifying retention of that status during 1963 and 1964.

On the fourth of July in 1963, the Salmon suffered personnel casualties when mercury from a broken thermometer came into contact with a hot grid, creating toxic mercury vapor, resulting in the poisoning of 14 crewmembers.

On 3 June of the latter year, she put into the San Francisco Naval Shipyard to undergo FRAM II conversion. Departing the yard on 19 April 1965, as a modernized "GUPPY III", she moved to the Puget Sound, Washington, area for evaluation and sound tests. She then returned to San Diego, to resume local operations, on 4 May.

Salmon commenced her fourth WestPac deployment on 23 August. She joined Submarine Flotilla (SubFlot) 7 of the Seventh Fleet on 14 September and conducted operations in Japanese and southwest Pacific waters until returning to San Diego on 20 April 1966. Salmon's fifth deployment to the western Pacific was from 20 March to 4 October 1967. During this tour, she provided services to Seventh Fleet units operating off Vietnam in support of Vietnam War operations. In September, she rendezvoused with ballistic missile submarines USS Ulysses S. Grant and USS Kamehameha somewhere in the Pacific to act as a simulated target submarine for training in antisubmarine tactics.

Through the spring of 1968, Salmon underwent overhaul at San Francisco, California, in preparation for support of the Deep Submergence Rescue Vehicle (DSRV) program, to evaluate submarine rescue and salvage equipment at extreme depths. On 1 June, she was redesignated an auxiliary research submarine and given hull classification symbol AGSS-573 for her role as mother sub and underway submerged launching and recovery platform for the experimental mini-subs. However, delays in the program resulted in her return to San Diego for local operations, following preliminary trials at Puget Sound. She subsequently sailed on 25 October for her sixth WestPac deployment.

In November, Salmon visited Yokosuka and Hong Kong. From 4 to 19 December, she conducted special operations off the coast of Vietnam, and, from 26 December 1968 to 10 January 1969, she participated in SEATO exercises out of Sangley Point in the Philippines. She then returned to Yokosuka and then proceeded to Sasebo for special operations before returning to the United States on 5 April. Salmon arrived at San Diego, California, on 25 April and conducted local operations for the remainder of the year. She resumed her former hull classification symbol as SS-573 on 30 June.

=== 1970–1977 ===
On 3 January 1970, she departed San Diego for her seventh WestPac tour. In February, she conducted type training in the Philippines with submarine Harder (SS-568) and her sister sub, Sailfish (SS-572). From there, she visited Buckner Bay, Okinawa; Bangkok, Thailand; Sasebo, Yokosuka, and Kobe, Japan; and Hong Kong. She returned to San Diego on 27 June and resumed local operations. She remained so employed for the rest of 1970 and throughout 1971.

Salmon departed San Diego on 17 February 1972 on her eighth deployment to the western Pacific. She entered a harbor of Vietnam during the Vietnam War where she laid mines and gathered intelligence. Her CO was Harry Merwin Yockey. In April, she rescued survivors from the Japanese coastal freighter Koei Maru Number 2 which sank about 30 nautical miles (56 km) south of the entrance to Tokyo Bay. In July, she joined units of the Royal Australian Navy and Royal Australian Air Force in an antisubmarine warfare exercise. Salmon departed Pago Pago on 13 August and re-entered San Diego on 26 August.

She remained on the west coast for the remainder of 1972 and for the first five and one-half months of 1973. On 16 June, she headed west for what was to have been her ninth deployment to the Far East. Upon her arrival in Pearl Harbor, the deployment was canceled due to damage to her number three and number four main engines. On 10 August she sailed back to San Diego to prepare for overhaul. Salmon entered Mare Island Naval Shipyard on 17 November and commenced overhaul nine days later.

=== Decommissioning and fate ===
Salmon was decommissioned and stricken from the Naval Vessel Register on 1 October 1977. In 1992 Salmon was converted to a shallow water sonar target and sunk near Hudson Canyon, south of Long Island, as a bottom target on 5 June 1993.
