= S3G reactor =

The S3G reactor is a naval reactor used by the United States Navy to provide electricity generation and propulsion on warships. The S3G designation stands for:

- S = Submarine platform
- 3 = Third generation core designed by the contractor
- G = General Electric was the contracted designer

== Design ==
This nuclear reactor generates 78 MW. It consists of a highly enriched uranium core with a 2-loop pressurized water reactor.

== History ==
This design, designated as S4G, was used for the two reactors on the USS Triton (SSRN-586); no other ships used this reactor plant. The plant had unique design features such as horizontal steam generator U-tubes, and it was one of the only submarine plants with a deaereating feed tank (DFT). The secondary plant was modeled on existing destroyer steam plants with steam-driven feed pumps and steam-driven main circulating pumps.

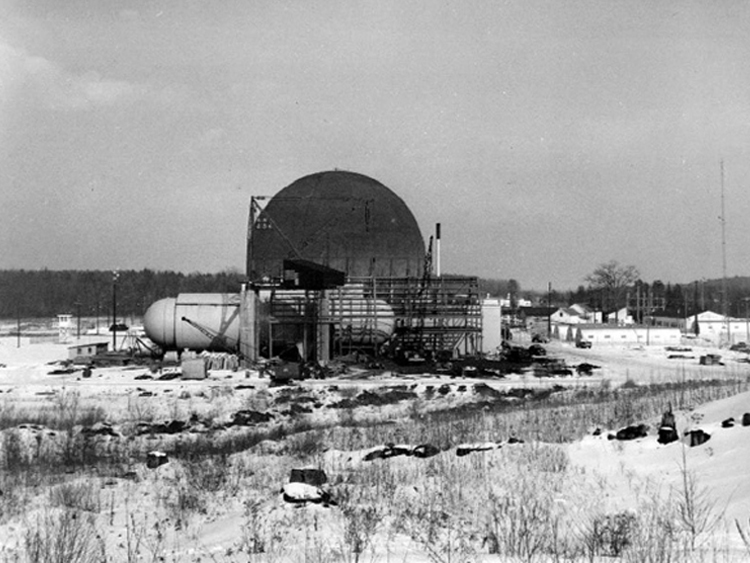
S3G prototype under construction at the Kesselring Site, to be operational August 1958

A prototype reactor was built ashore at Knolls Atomic Power Laboratory's Kesselring Site in West Milton, New York in 1958 to test the reactor design. Once the design was proven, the prototype continued operation to train students and test new systems and materials. This prototype training reactor was taken off line in 1992 and subsequently decommissioned.

Although the design of the entire S3G reactor plant (core, piping, pumps, etc.) saw only limited use, a design version of the reactor core ("S3G3" or "S3G core 3") was later used for replacement cores for the Navy's 100 S5W reactor plants when refueled. Another unique feature of the S3G core 3 was the use of Y-shaped control rods versus the standard cruciform control rods used in the S5W core. The core also utilized a rod configuration called "skewed divergent" for ease of maintenance.

The S3G prototype was located at West Milton, N.Y. and consisted of a submarine reactor unit, engine compartments and a few office spaces. There were airlocks at each end of the containment hull and a negative atmospheric pressure was maintained in the unit. The negative pressure was to ensure that any gasses released into the prototype wouldn't escape into the local environment. It was a large cylinder painted green and was called "The Green Weenie" by the students stationed there.
