= Shakedown cruise =

Performance testing of a ship

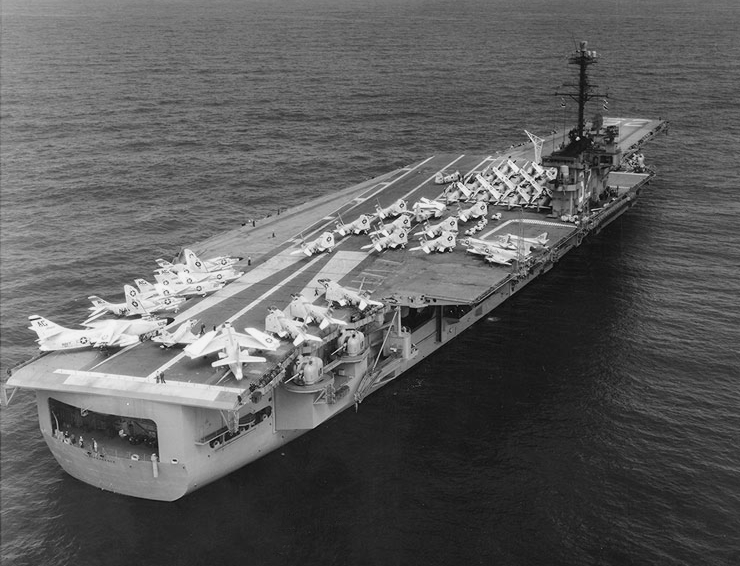
USS Independence during her initial shakedown cruise in 1959

Shakedown cruise is a nautical term for a cruise in which the performance of a ship is tested. Generally, shakedown cruises are performed before a ship enters service or after major changes such as a crew change, repair, refit, or overhaul. The shakedown cruise simulates working conditions for the vessel for various reasons. For most new ships, the primary reasons are to familiarise the crew with the new vessel and ensure all systems are functional.

== Overview ==
If the ship is the first of its class, it will likely also be performing its sea trials, a test of its performance. In this context, 'shakedown cruise' and 'sea trials' may be used interchangeably, though each has a slightly different meaning. In such a case, the ship's systems will likely be pushed to redline, or maximum capacity, to demonstrate the class's speed and other essential traits. Until bested by another ship of the same class, this shakedown performance will be the standard of the class's capabilities, and its success may determine whether the class is to enter full production.

In the travel industry, a shakedown cruise is also undertaken to test the ship and service crew. These test cruises are sometimes made with passengers travelling at a discount.

== Availability ==
A vessel is typically not committed to any timetables or tasks until it completes its shakedown cruise. As such, problems detected during the shakedown cruise can be fixed at minimal cost. While the ship is assigned to the industrial activity for this purpose, this period is known as an "availability". In the US Navy, the typical length of an availability is 45 to 120 days, and per regulation, it must be completed no more than eleven months after the month the ship was first delivered. This is also known as a "post-shakedown availability".

== Famous examples ==
The USS Triton, a nuclear-powered radar picket submarine, was the first vessel to execute a submerged circumnavigation of Earth while on its shakedown cruise in early 1960. Triton is the only U.S. Navy ship to receive a Presidential Unit Citation for its shakedown cruise. USS Massachusetts's shakedown cruise was Operation Torch.
