= USS Argonaut (SM-1) =

Submarine of the United States

Coordinates: 5°40′14″S 153°54′56″E

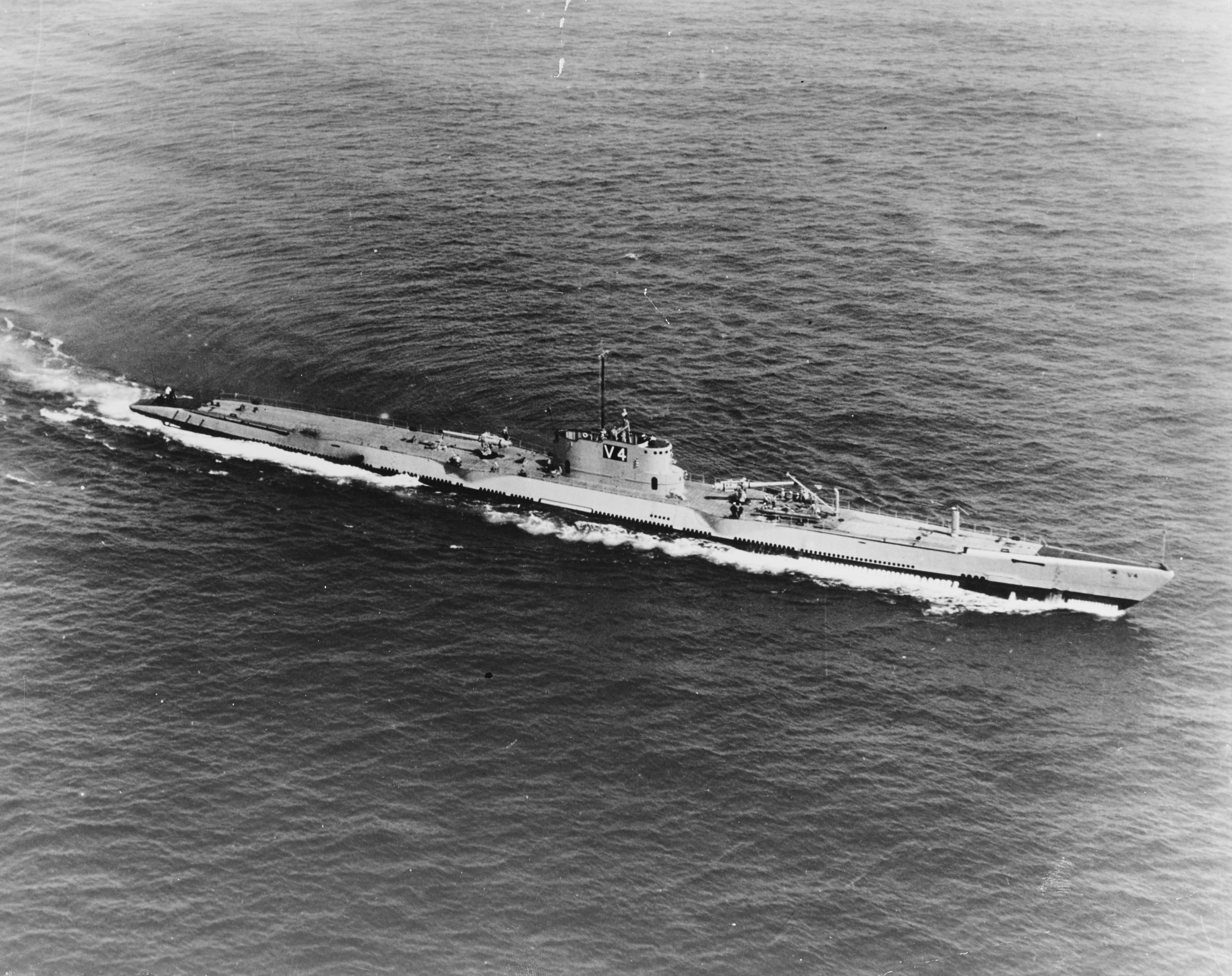
- USS Argonaut underway.

History

United States
- Name: USS Argonaut
- Builder: Portsmouth Naval Shipyard, Kittery, Maine
- Laid down: 1 May 1925
- Launched: 10 November 1927
- Commissioned: 2 April 1928
- Fate: Sunk by Japanese destroyers off Rabaul on 10 January 1943

General characteristics
- Class & type: V-boat V-4 composite direct-drive diesel and diesel-electric submarine
- Displacement: Surfaced: 2,710 long tons (2,753 t) (standard); 3,046 long tons (3,095 t) (full load); Submerged: 4,161 long tons (4,228 t)
- Length: 358 ft (109 m) (waterline), 381 ft (116 m) (overall)
- Beam: 33 ft 9.5 in (10.300 m)
- Draft: 16 ft .25 in (4.8832 m)
- Propulsion: As Built: 2 × BuEng (MAN-designed) direct-drive main diesel engines, 1,400 hp (1,000 kW) each.; 1 × BuEng MAN auxiliary diesel-electric diesel generator, 300 kW (400 hp); Re-Engined 1942: 4 × General Motors Winton main diesel engines, 1,200 hp (890 kW) each, 1 × GM Winton 300 kW (400 hp) and 1 × GM Winton 150 kW (200 hp) auxiliary diesel generators, 2 × 120-cell Exide ULS37 batteries, 2 × Ridgway electric motors, 1,100 hp (820 kW) each, 2 × shafts
- Speed: Surfaced: 15 kn (17 mph; 28 km/h) (design); 13.6 kn (15.7 mph; 25.2 km/h) (trials); Submerged: 8 kn (9.2 mph; 15 km/h) (design); 7.43 kn (8.55 mph; 13.76 km/h) (trials)
- Range: 8,000 nmi (9,200 mi; 15,000 km) at 10 kn (12 mph; 19 km/h); 18,000 nmi (21,000 mi; 33,000 km) @ 10 kn (12 mph; 19 km/h) with fuel in main ballast tanks
- Endurance: 10 hours @ 5 kn (5.8 mph; 9.3 km/h)
- Test depth: 300 ft (91 m)
- Capacity: 173,875 US gal (658,190 L) diesel fuel
- Complement: As Built: 8 officers, 78 men; 1931: 7 officers, 9 chief petty officers, 71 enlisted
- Armament: As Built: 4 × 21 inch (533 mm) torpedo tubes (bow; 16 torpedoes), 2 × 40 inch (1,016 mm)minelaying tubes aft (60 mines), 2 × 6 inch (152 mm)/53 caliber Mark XII Mod 2 wet type deck guns; 1942: 6 × 21 inch (533 mm) torpedo tubes (4 bow, 2 stern external; 20 torpedoes), minelaying tubes removed, 2 × 6 inch deck guns as above, 2 × 20 mm cannon, 2 × .30 caliber machine guns
- Notes: Two Battle stars

USS Argonaut (V-4/SF-7/SM-1/A-1/APS-1/SS-166) was a submarine of the United States Navy, the first boat to carry the name. Argonaut was laid down as V-4 on 1 May 1925 at Portsmouth Navy Yard. She was launched on 10 November 1927, sponsored by Mrs. Philip Mason Sears, the daughter of Rear Admiral William D. MacDougall, and commissioned on 2 April 1928. Although never officially designated as "SS-166", at some point she displayed this number on her conning tower.

She was sunk by Japanese destroyers while engaging their convoy near Rabaul in Oceania on 10 January 1943, with the loss of 102 lives.

== Design ==
V-4 was the first of the second generation of V-boats commissioned in the late 1920s, which remain the largest non-nuclear submarines ever built by the United States. V-4 was the behemoth of its class. These submarines were exempt by special agreement from the armament and tonnage limitations of the 1922 Washington Naval Treaty. Her configuration, and that of the following V-5 and V-6, resulted from an evolving strategic concept that increasingly emphasized the possibility of a naval war with Japan in the far western Pacific. This factor, and the implications of the 1922 Washington Naval Treaty, suggested the need for long-range submarine "cruisers", or "strategic scouts", as well as long-range minelayers, for which long endurance, not high speed, was most important. The design was possibly influenced by the German "U-cruisers" of the Type U-139 and Type U-151 U-boat classes, although V-4, V-5, and V-6 were all larger than these. V-4 and her near-sisters V-5 (Narwhal) and V-6 (Nautilus) were initially designed with larger and more powerful MAN-designed diesel engines than the Busch-Sulzer engines that propelled earlier V-boats, which were failures. The specially built engines failed to produce their design power, and some developed dangerous crankcase explosions. V-4 was ultimately completed with smaller MAN diesels of 1,400 hp (1,000 kW), compared with 2,350 hp (1,750 kW) for V-5 and V-6. The smaller diesels were required to allow sufficient space for mine storage.

The engine specifications as built were two BuEng-manufactured, MAN-designed direct-drive 6-cylinder 4-cycle main diesel engines, 1,400 hp (1,000 kW) each. A BuEng MAN 6-cylinder 4-cycle auxiliary diesel engine of 450 hp (340 kW), driving a Ridgway 300 kW (400 hp) electric generator, was provided for charging batteries or for additional diesel-electric propulsion power.

A more successful propulsion improvement in V-4 was the replacement of earlier submarines' pairs of 60-cell batteries with a pair of 120-cell batteries, thus doubling the available voltage to the electric motors when submerged. This battery configuration would be standard until the GUPPY program following World War II. V-4 and her sisters were slow in diving and, when submerged, were unwieldy and slower than designed. They also presented an excellent target for surface ship sonar and had a large turning radius.

For the first time in U.S. submarine construction, the Portsmouth Navy Yard utilized welding during the assembly process. Led by Navy welding expert James W. Owens, welding was used in non-critical areas such as the superstructure, piping brackets, and support framing. V-4 ended up being built to a mixed method construction, with both the inner and outer hulls still riveted. Owens was eager to expand the use of welding in ship construction, and its use on V-4 was entirely successful. All subsequent submarines built for the USN used welding to some extent, with the method adopted in whole in 1936.

Designed primarily as a minelayer, and built at a cost of US$6,150,000, V-4 was the first and only such specialized type ever built by the United States. She had four torpedo tubes forward and two minelaying tubes aft. At the time of construction, V-4 was the largest submarine ever built in the U.S., and was the largest in U.S. Navy service for 30 years.

Her minelaying arrangements were "highly ingenious, but extremely complicated", filling two aft compartments. A compensating tube ran down the center of the two spaces, to make up for the lost weight as mines were laid, as well as to store eight additional mines. The other mines were racked in three groups around this tube, two in the fore compartment, one aft, with a hydraulically driven rotating cage between them. Mines were moved by hydraulic worm shafts, the aft racks connecting directly to the launch tubes, which had vertically sliding hydraulic doors (rather than the usual hinged ones of torpedo tubes). Each launch tube was normally loaded with four mines, and a water 'round mines (WRM) tube flooded to compensate as they were laid, then pumped into the compensating tube. Eight mines could be laid in 10 minutes.

== Interwar period ==
Following commissioning, V-4 served with Submarine Division 12 based at Newport, Rhode Island.

She proved perennially underpowered, but engine replacement was postponed by war, and her MAN diesels were a constant source of trouble.

In January–February 1929, V-4 underwent a series of trials off Provincetown, Massachusetts. On a trial dive during this period, she submerged to a depth of 318 ft (97 m). This mark was the greatest depth an American submarine had reached up to that time. On 26 February 1929, V-4 was assigned to Submarine Division 20 (SubDiv 20), and arrived at San Diego, California on 23 March. From there, she participated in battle exercises and made cruises along the West Coast.

In 1931, the V-4 was heavily featured in Seas Beneath, an American action film directed by John Ford. The V-4 was repainted to appear as a World War I German submarine, the fictional 'U-172'. Argonaut also appeared as a German World War I U-boat in the post-Code 1931 film Suicide Fleet, about three US Navy sailors on a schooner submarine decoy Q-ship and their liberty adventures pursuing a beautiful Coney Island concessionaire. In this film she appeared as the 'U-200.' Suicide Fleet starred William Boyd, who later found fame as Hopalong Cassidy, and featured a very young Ginger Rogers as the love interest in one of her first featured roles.

V-4 was renamed Argonaut on 19 February 1931, and redesignated SM-1 (submarine, minelayer) on 1 July. On 30 June 1932, she arrived at Pearl Harbor, where she was assigned to SubDiv 7. She carried out minelaying operations, patrol duty, and other routine work. In October 1934 and again in May 1939, Argonaut took part in joint Army-Navy exercises in the Hawaiian operating area. Argonaut became the flagship of Submarine Squadron 4 (SubRon 4). The submarine returned to the West Coast in April 1941 to participate in fleet tactical exercises.

== World War II ==
On 28 November 1941 Argonaut, commanded by Stephen G. Barchet left Pearl Harbor to patrol around Midway Island with USS Trout as Midway Defense Group 7.2. She was notified by radio of the Japanese attack on Pearl Harbor when she surfaced a few minutes after sunset on 7 December. Argonaut set general quarters two hours later to investigate naval gunfire around Midway. While designed as a minelayer and not an attack submarine, Argonaut made the first wartime approach on enemy naval forces; but poor maneuverability prevented reaching a suitable position for surfaced torpedo launch against the two Japanese destroyers shelling Midway. One of the destroyers saw Argonaut as she dived to make a submerged second approach in the bright moonlight; but the destroyer was unable to locate the submerged submarine, and Argonaut was again unable to maneuver into position to launch torpedoes. After being held down all night, Argonaut surfaced at dawn to recharge batteries and was unsuccessfully bombed by a United States plane from Midway.

Argonaut's dehumidifiers were ineffective at preventing condensation, which caused electrical fires, making various pieces of electrical machinery inoperative. Three crewmen were sick with high fevers, but President Roosevelt's mention of Argonaut's contribution to the war effort in a radio speech encouraged Barchet to resist the temptation to abort the patrol. By trimming the submarine 17 tons heavy, the crew was able to reduce diving time to 52 seconds by skillfully coordinated pumping between fore and aft ballast tanks; but that time was still considered too slow to avoid hostile aircraft. Argonaut successfully rendezvoused with USS Litchfield at 06:00 20 January 1942, so the destroyer could escort her back to Pearl Harbor.

=== Conversion to troop transport ===
On 22 January 1942, she returned to Pearl Harbor and, after a brief stop, proceeded to Mare Island Naval Shipyard for major overhaul. While there, her diesels were replaced with General Motors Winton 12-258Ss totaling 4,800 hp (3,600 kW) with hydraulic drive through reduction gears, and her minelaying gear was removed to prepare for conversion to a troop transport submarine. The auxiliary diesel generator was replaced by a 300 kW (400 hp) GM Winton 8-268A and a 150 kW (200 hp) GM Winton 4-268A. She was also fitted with a Torpedo Data Computer (lack of which likely inhibited her ability to score with torpedoes), new electronics, and two external stern torpedo tubes on the after casing, along with two stern deck stowage tubes. It appears she was not fitted with bow external torpedo tubes, as were Narwhal and Nautilus, as photos taken after the refit do not show them. On return to Pearl Harbor, the conversion to a troop transport submarine was "hastily" finished.

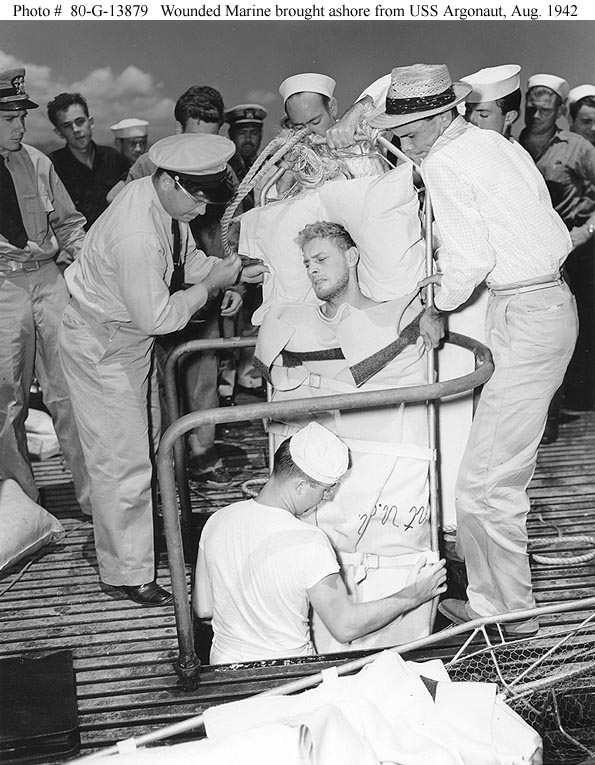
A Marine Raider, injured during the Makin operation, is lifted through a hatch on USS Argonaut to be taken ashore at Pearl Harbor, 26 August 1942.

Argonaut returned to action in the South Pacific in August. Admiral Chester W. Nimitz assigned Argonaut and Nautilus to transport and land Marine Raiders on Makin Island in the Gilbert Islands for the Makin Raid. This move was designed to relieve pressure on American forces that had just landed on Guadalcanal. On 8 August, the two submarines embarked 120 troops of Companies A and B, 2nd Raider Battalion, and got underway for Makin. Conditions during the transit were unpleasant, and most of the marines became seasick. The convoy arrived off Makin on 16 August, and at 03:30 the next day the Marines began landing. Their rubber rafts were swamped by the sea and most of the outboard motors drowned. The Japanese—either forewarned or extraordinarily alert—were ready for the Americans' arrival. Snipers were hidden in the trees, and the landing beaches were in front of the Japanese forces instead of behind them as planned. However, by midnight of 18 August, the Japanese garrison of about 85 men was wiped out; radio stations, fuel, and other supplies and installations were destroyed, and all but 30 of the troops had been recovered.

=== Sinking ===
Argonaut arrived back in Pearl Harbor on 26 August. Her hull classification symbol was changed from SM-1 to APS-1 (transport submarine) on 22 September. She was never formally designated SS-166, but that hull number was reserved for her and a photo shows she occasionally displayed it. Her base of operations was transferred to Brisbane, Queensland, later in the year. In December, she departed Brisbane under Lieutenant Commander John R. Pierce to patrol the hazardous area between New Britain and Bougainville Island, south of Bismarck Archipelago. On 2 January 1943, Argonaut sank the Japanese gunboat Ebon Maru in the Bismarck Sea. On 10 January, Argonaut spotted a convoy of five freighters and their escorting destroyers – Maikaze, Isokaze, and Hamakaze – returning to Rabaul from Lae. By chance, a United States Army Air Forces (USAAF) aircraft – which was out of bombs – was flying overhead and witnessed Argonaut's attack. A crewman on board the plane saw one destroyer hit by a torpedo, and the destroyers promptly counterattacking. Argonaut's bow suddenly broke the water at an unusual angle. It was apparent that a depth charge had severely damaged the submarine. The destroyers continued circling Argonaut, pumping shells into her; she slipped below the waves and was never heard from again. One hundred and two officers and men went down with her, the worst loss of life for an American submarine in wartime. Her name was stricken from the Naval Vessel Register on 26 February.

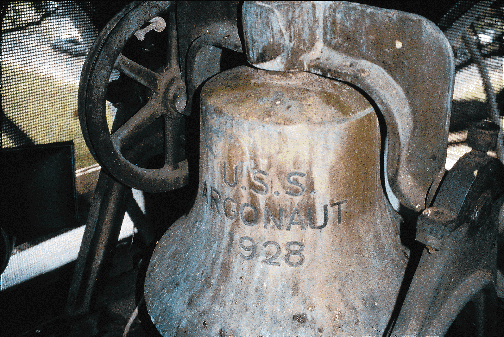
The ship's bell of USS Argonaut that was donated before Argonaut was lost in combat in 1943, still serves in the Submarine Memorial Chapel at Pearl Harbor

Japanese reports made available at the end of the war recorded a depth charge attack followed by gunfire, at which time they "destroyed the top of the sub".

On the basis of the report given by the USAAF flier who witnessed the attack in which Argonaut sank, she was credited with damaging a Japanese destroyer on her last patrol. (Postwar, the JANAC accounting gave her none.) Since none of the histories of the three escorting destroyers reports damage on 10 January 1943, the destroyer "hit" may have been a premature explosion.

Before her crew left for their third war patrol, they donated Argonaut's bell. Nearly 20 months after her loss, the Submarine Memorial Chapel was built and dedicated on the Submarine Base in Pearl Harbor. The bell hanging in her steeple comes from Argonaut, and still rings today for services.

== Awards ==

American Defense Service Medal with "FLEET" clasp	Asiatic-Pacific Campaign Medal with two battle stars	World War II Victory Medal

== See also ==
- HMS M3 – British minelaying submarine of same period.
