= List of United States naval reactors =

This is a list of all naval reactors designed, built, or used by the United States Navy.

== Reactor designations ==
Each nuclear reactor design is given a three-character designation consisting of a letter representing the type of ship the reactor is intended for, a consecutive generation number, and a letter indicating the reactor's designer.

Ship types:

- "A" – aircraft carrier
- "C" – cruiser
- "D" – destroyer
- "S" – submarine

Contracted designers:

- "B" – Bechtel
- "C" – Combustion Engineering
- "G" – General Electric
- "W" – Westinghouse

== Nuclear reactors of the United States Navy ==
Naval reactors of the United States Navy, listed alphabetically by ship type.

=== Aircraft carrier reactors ===
- A1W reactor
  - land-based prototype for USS Enterprise (CVN-65); located at Naval Reactors Facility
- A2W reactor
  - USS Enterprise (CVN-65)
- A3W reactor
  - designed for USS John F. Kennedy (CV-67), but never installed
- A4W reactor
  - Nimitz-class aircraft carriers
- A1B reactor
  - Gerald R. Ford-class aircraft carriers

=== Cruiser reactors ===
- C1W reactor
  - Long Beach-class cruiser

=== Destroyer reactors ===
- D1G reactor
  - land-based prototype for Bainbridge-class cruiser; located at the Kesselring site
- D2G reactor
  - Bainbridge-class cruiser
  - Truxtun-class cruiser
  - California-class cruiser
  - Virginia-class cruiser

=== Submarine reactors ===
- NR-1 reactor
  - one-of-a-kind reactor built for the U.S. Navy research submarine NR-1
- S1C reactor
  - land-based prototype for USS Tullibee (SSN-597); located at Windsor, Connecticut
- S1G reactor
  - land-based prototype for USS Seawolf (SSN-575); located at Kesselring site
- S1W reactor
  - land-based prototype for USS Nautilus (SSN-571); located at Naval Reactors Facility
- S2C reactor
  - USS Tullibee (SSN-597)
- S2G reactor
  - USS Seawolf (SSN-575)
- S2W reactor
  - USS Nautilus (SSN-571)
- S2Wa reactor
  - replacement reactor for USS Seawolf (SSN-575)
- S3G reactor
  - land-based prototype for USS Triton (SSN-586); located at Kesselring site
- S3W reactor
  - USS Skate (SSN-578)
  - USS Sargo (SSN-583)
  - USS Halibut (SSGN-587)
- S4G reactor
  - USS Triton (SSRN-586)
- S4W reactor
  - USS Swordfish (SSN-579)
  - USS Seadragon (SSN-584)
- S5G reactor
  - A land-based prototype located at Naval Reactors Facility
  - USS Narwhal (SSN-671)
- S5W reactor
  - Skipjack-class submarine (SSN-585 class)
  - George Washington-class submarine (SSBN-598 class)
  - Thresher/Permit-class submarine (SSN-593/SSN-594 class)
  - Ethan Allen-class submarine (SSBN-608 class)
  - Lafayette-class submarine (SSBN-616 class)
  - James Madison-class submarine (SSBN-627 class)
  - Benjamin Franklin-class submarine (SSBN-640 class)
  - Sturgeon-class submarine (SSN-637 class)
  - USS Parche (SSN-683)
  - USS Glenard P. Lipscomb (SSN-685)
- S6G reactor
  - Los Angeles-class submarine (SSN-688 class)
- S6W reactor
  - Seawolf-class submarine (SSN-21 class)
- S7G reactor
  - land-based prototype (Modifications and Additions to a Reactor Facility or "MARF"), located at the Kesselring site
- S8G reactor
  - Ohio-class submarines (SSBN-726 class)
- S9G reactor
  - Virginia-class submarine (SSN-774 class)
- S1B reactor
  - Columbia-class submarine (SSBN-826 class)

== See also ==
- List of commercial nuclear reactors
- Nuclear marine propulsion
- Rolls-Royce PWR – United Kingdom's naval reactors
- Soviet naval reactors
- United States naval reactors
