= Nuclear-powered cruisers of the United States Navy =

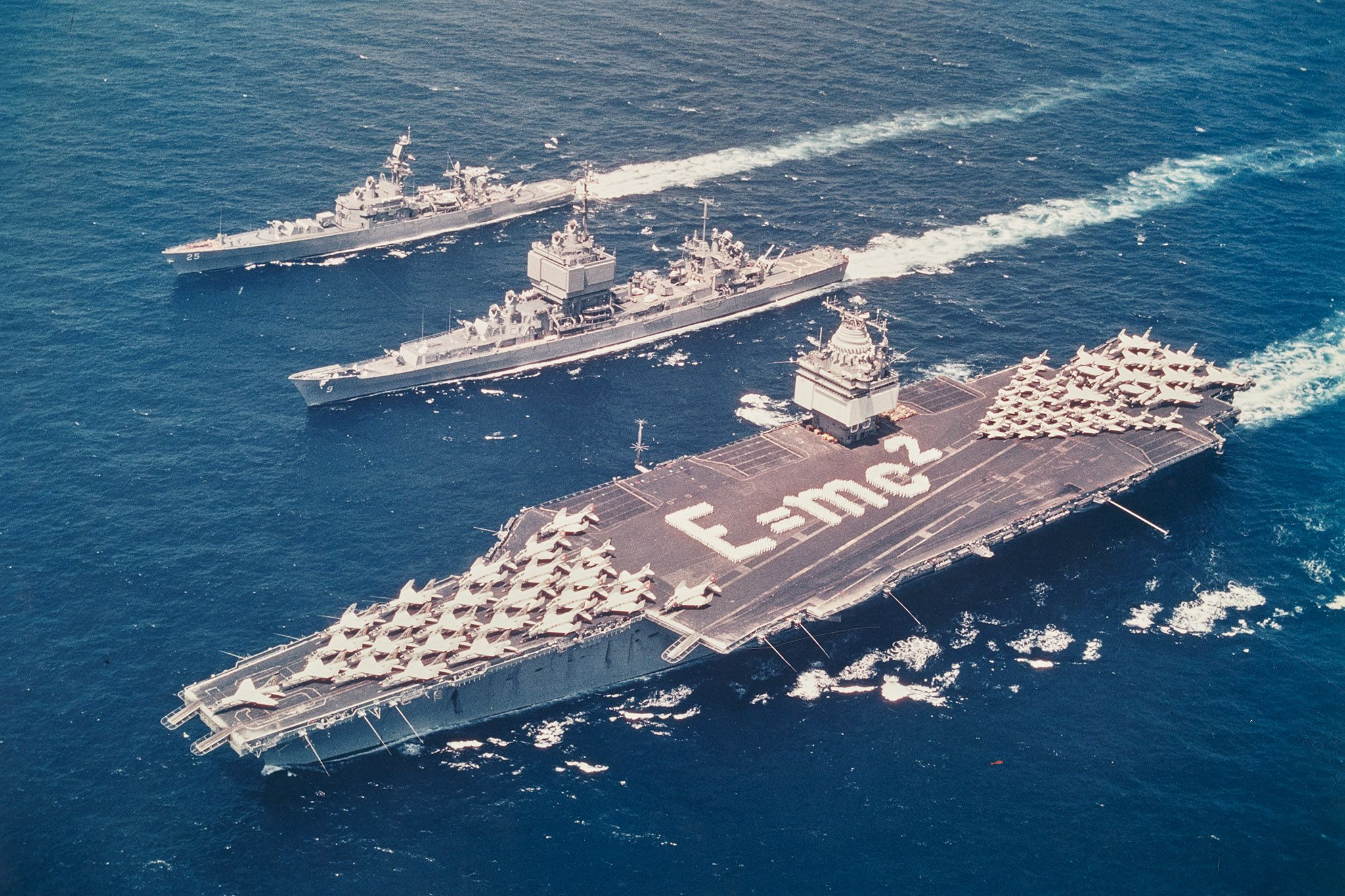
Task Force One underway during Operation Sea Orbit in 1964, with USS Bainbridge (top), USS Long Beach (center), USS Enterprise (bottom)

In the early 1960s, the United States Navy was the world's first to have nuclear-powered cruisers as part of its fleet. The first such ship was USS Long Beach (CGN-9). Commissioned in late summer 1961, she was the world's first nuclear-powered surface combatant. She was followed a year later by USS Bainbridge (DLGN-25). While Long Beach was a 'true cruiser', meaning she was designed and built as a cruiser, Bainbridge began life as a frigate, though at that time the Navy was using the hull code "DLGN" for "destroyer leader, guided missile, nuclear". This was prior to the enactment of the 1975 ship reclassification plan, in which frigates (DLG/DLGN), which were essentially large destroyers, were reclassified as cruisers, so that the US Navy's numbers would compete with those of the Soviet Navy. Long Beach, the largest of all the nuclear cruisers, was equipped with a C1W cruiser reactor, while all the others were equipped with D2G destroyer reactors.

In the summer of 1964, Long Beach and Bainbridge would meet up with USS Enterprise (CVAN-65), the Navy's first nuclear-powered aircraft carrier, to form Task Force One, an all-nuclear-powered naval unit. They would commence Operation Sea Orbit, in which they circumnavigated the globe without refuelling. It was a remarkable achievement for its time, a naval group capable of sailing over 48,000 kilometers (26,000 nmi; 30,000 mi) in just 65 days, without replenishment.

In the spring of 1967 came the Navy's third nuclear-powered cruiser, (though initially labeled a frigate), USS Truxtun (DLGN-35), a heavily modified design based on the Belknap-class cruiser. Truxtun would be followed by the two-ship California class, beginning with USS California (CGN-36) in February 1974 and USS South Carolina (CGN-37) in January 1975. The US Navy was the only fleet in the world with nuclear-powered cruisers until 1974 when the USSR would begin construction on their own nuclear battlecruiser, the Soviet battlecruiser Kirov, lead ship of the Kirov class. The Soviets would build four in total, between 1974 and 1998.

The last nuclear-powered cruisers the US produced were the four-ship Virginia class. USS Virginia (CGN-38) was commissioned in 1976, followed by USS Texas (CGN-39) in 1977, USS Mississippi (CGN-40) in 1978, and finally USS Arkansas (CGN-41) in 1980. A fifth Virginia class vessel was initially planned but then cancelled. Ultimately, these nuclear-powered cruisers would prove to be too costly to maintain, and they would all be retired between 1993 and 1999.

The US Navy currently has the largest fleet of nuclear-powered aircraft carriers and nuclear-powered submarines.

== List of United States Navy nuclear-powered cruisers ==
Ship Name	Hull Number	Class	Length	Displacement	Commissioned	Decommissioned	Service Life	Notes
USS Long Beach	CGN-9	Long Beach	721 ft 3 in (219.84 m)	15,540 tons	9 September 1961	1 May 1995	33 years, 7 months and 23 days	
USS Bainbridge	CGN-25	Bainbridge	565 ft 0 in (172.21 m)	9,100 tons	6 October 1962	13 July 1996	33 years, 9 months and 7 days	
USS Truxtun	CGN-35	Truxtun	564 ft 0 in (171.91 m)	8,659 tons	27 May 1967	11 September 1995	28 years, 3 months and 15 days	
USS California	CGN-36	California	587 ft 0 in (178.92 m)	10,800 tons	16 February 1974	9 July 1999	25 years, 4 months and 23 days	
USS South Carolina	CGN-37	California	587 ft 0 in (178.92 m)	10,800 tons	25 January 1975	30 July 1999	24 years, 6 months and 5 days	
USS Virginia	CGN-38	Virginia	586 ft 0 in (178.61 m)	11,666 tons	11 September 1976	10 November 1994	18 years, 1 month and 30 days	
USS Texas	CGN-39	Virginia	586 ft 0 in (178.61 m)	11,666 tons	10 September 1977	16 July 1993	15 years, 10 months and 6 days	
USS Mississippi	CGN-40	Virginia	586 ft 0 in (178.61 m)	11,666 tons	5 August 1978	28 July 1997	18 years, 11 months and 23 days	
USS Arkansas	CGN-41	Virginia	586 ft 0 in (178.61 m)	11,666 tons	18 October 1980	7 July 1998	17 years, 8 months and 19 days	

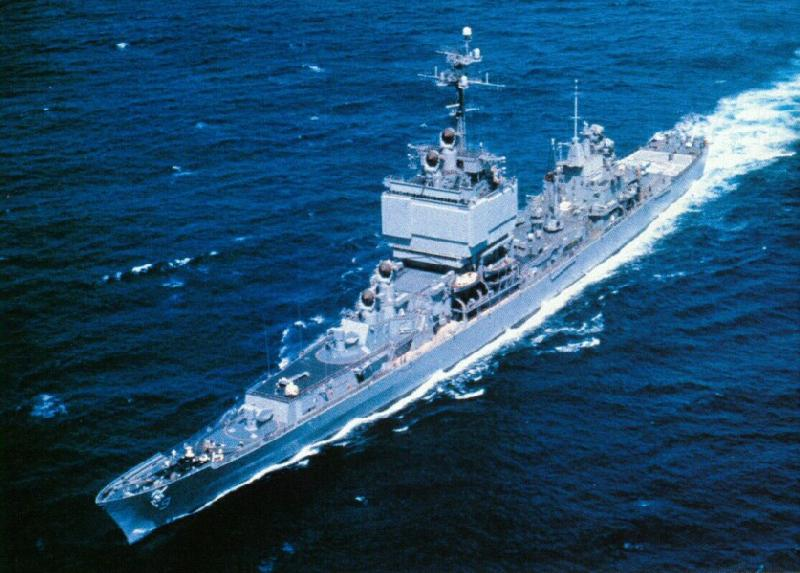
USS Long Beach
(CGN-9)

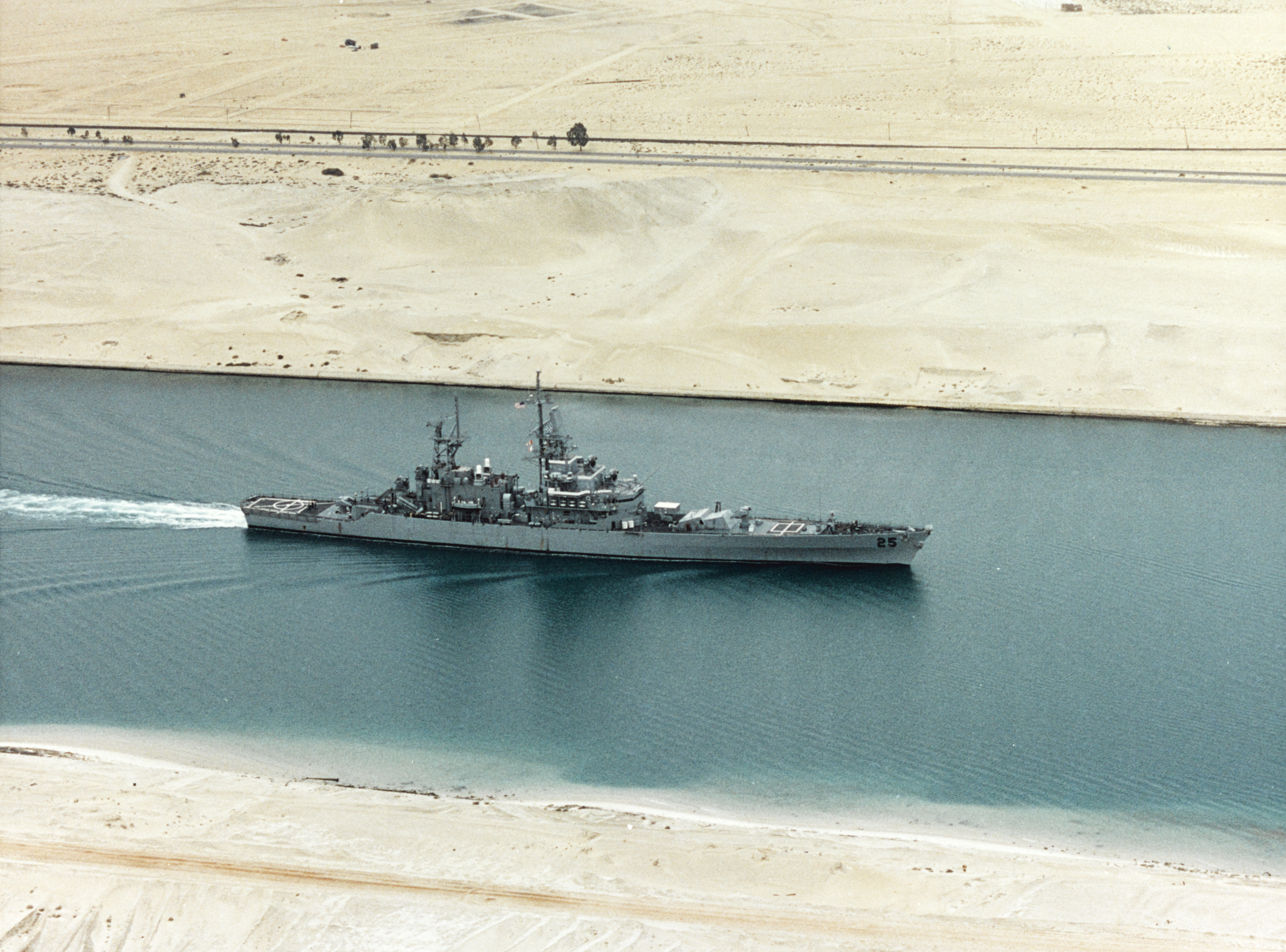
USS Bainbridge
(CGN-25)

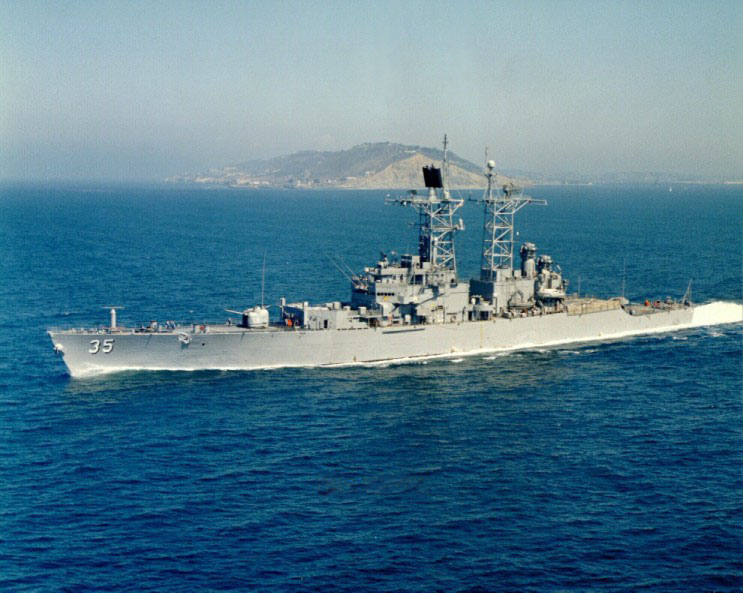
USS Truxtun
(CGN-35)

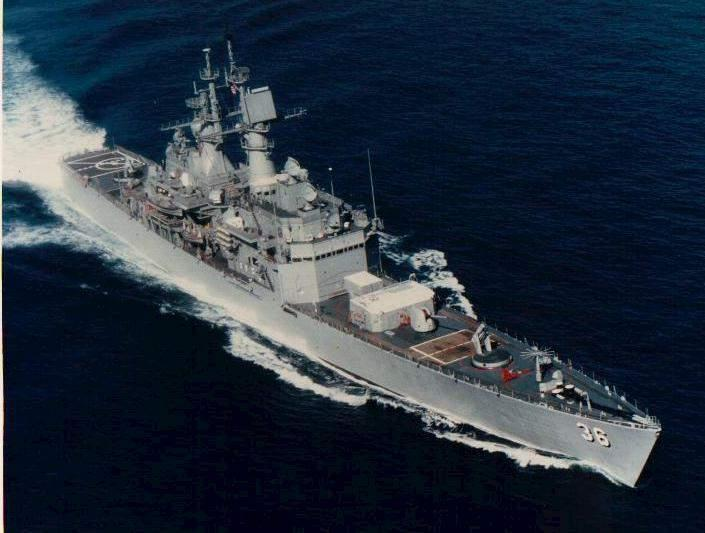
USS California
(CGN-36)

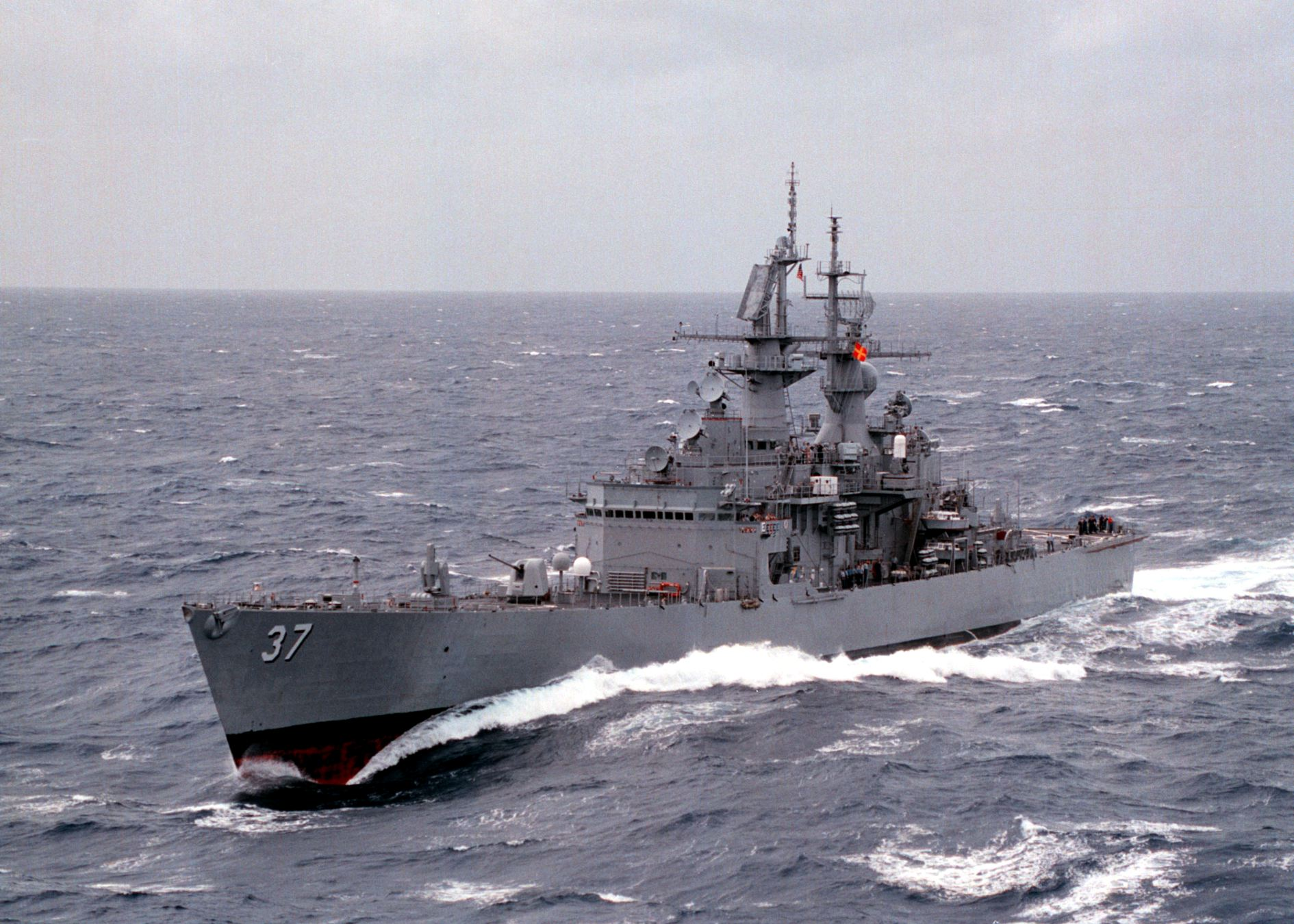
USS South Carolina
(CGN-37)

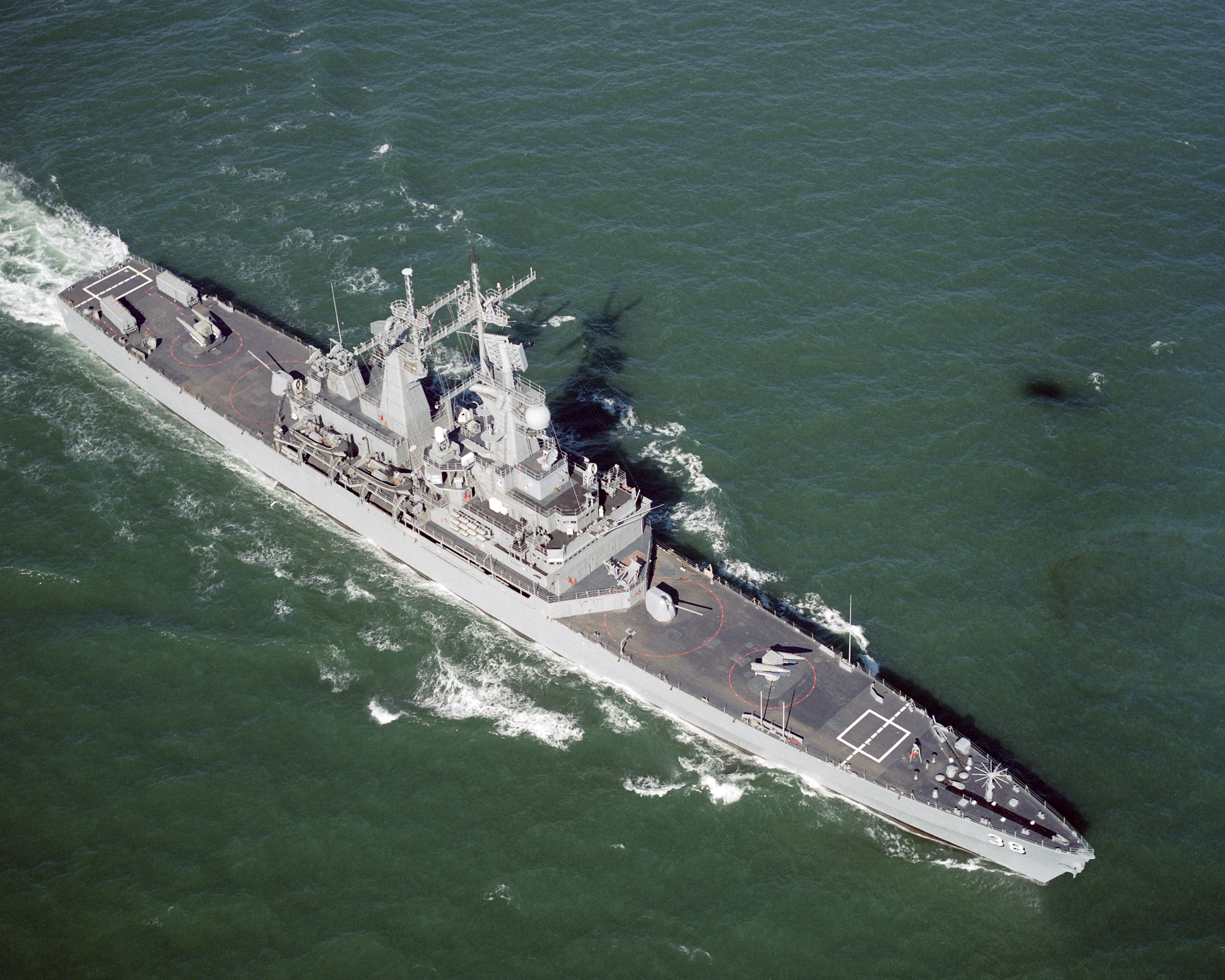
USS Virginia
(CGN-38)

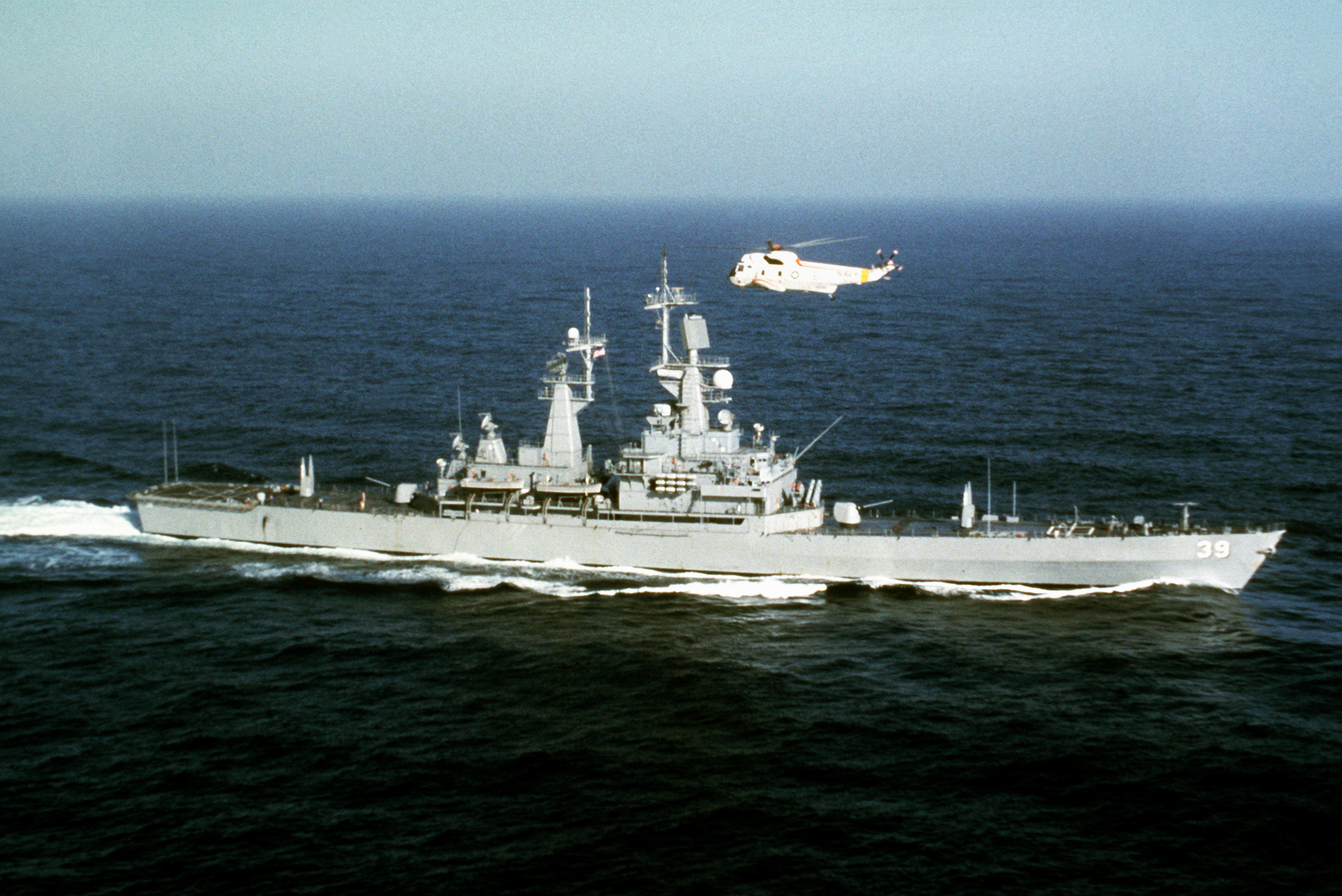
USS Texas
(CGN-39)

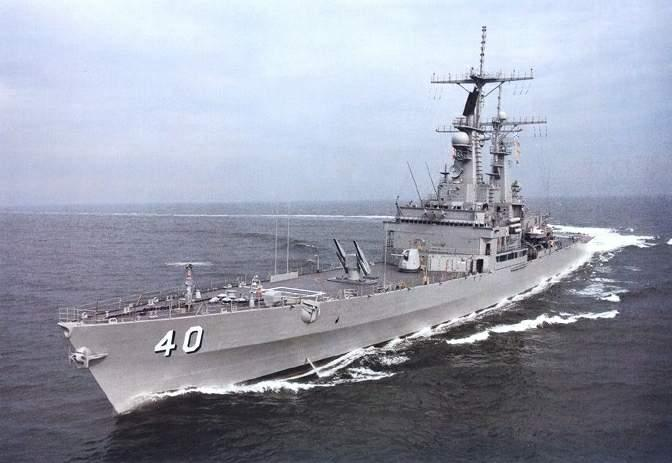
USS Mississippi
(CGN-40)

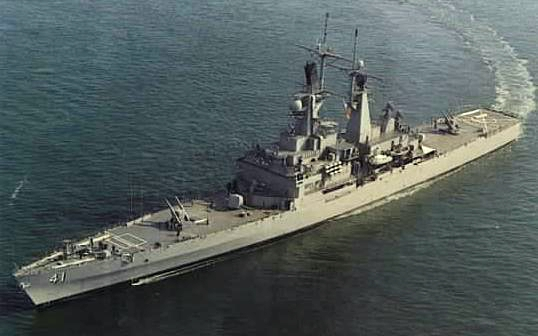
USS Arkansas
(CGN-41)

== See also ==
- Cold War
- List of United States Navy ships
- List of aircraft carriers of the United States Navy
- List of submarines of the United States Navy
- Nuclear navy
- Nuclear submarine
- Supercarrier
- USS Nautilus (SSN-571) - world's first nuclear-powered submarine
- USS Enterprise (CVN-65) - world's first nuclear-powered aircraft carrier
