= USS Sargo =

Two ships of the United States Navy have borne the name USS Sargo, named in honor of the sargo, a food and gamefish of the porgy family, inhabiting coastal waters of the southern United States.

- The first USS Sargo (SS-188), was the lead ship of her class of submarine, commissioned in 1939 and struck in 1946.
- The second USS Sargo (SSN-583), was a Skate-class submarine, commissioned in 1958 and struck in 1988.
