= S3W =

S3W may refer to:

- Saw III, the sequel to the Saw horror movie
- S3W reactor, a type of naval reactor used by the United States Navy
