= USS Texas (CGN-39) =

Virginia-class nuclear guided missile cruiser

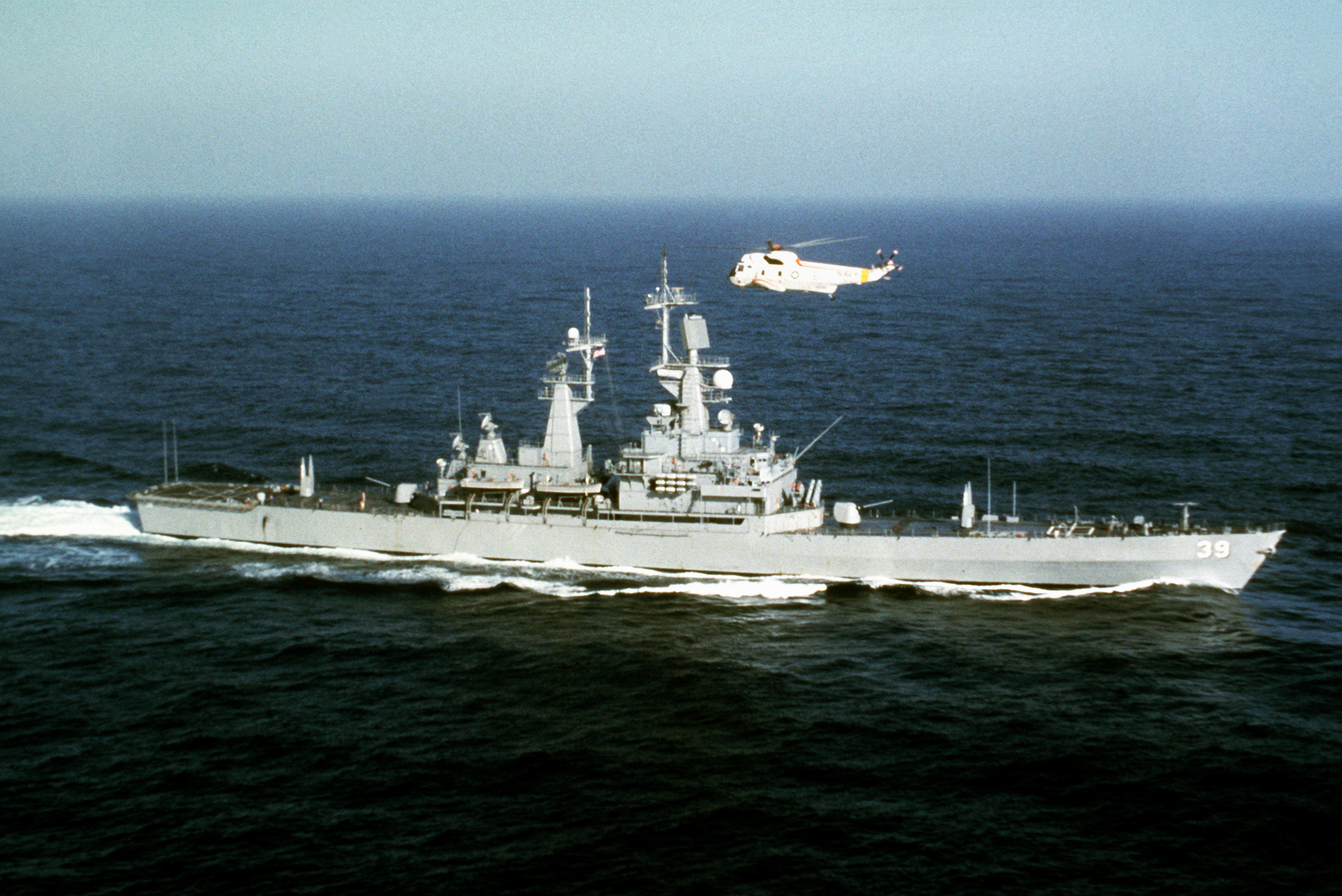
- USS Texas underway on 23 June 1985

History

United States
- Name: Texas
- Namesake: State of Texas
- Ordered: 21 December 1971
- Builder: Newport News Shipbuilding and Drydock Company
- Laid down: 18 August 1973
- Launched: 9 August 1975
- Sponsored by: Betty Jane Briscoe
- Commissioned: 10 September 1977
- Decommissioned: 16 July 1993
- Stricken: 16 July 1993
- Identification: Callsign: NTEX; Hull number: CGN-39
- Motto: Proud Heritage, Proud Purpose
- Fate: Nuclear Recycling, 30 October 2001
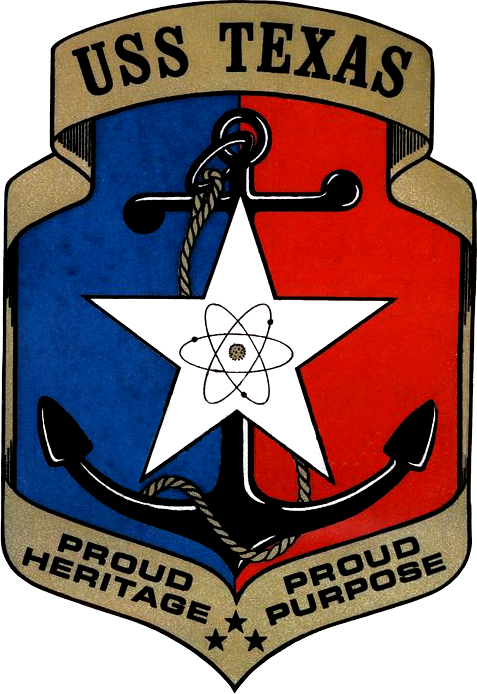
- Badge

General characteristics
- Class & type: Virginia-class cruiser
- Displacement: 11,000 long tons (11,000 t) full
- Length: 585 ft (178 m)
- Beam: 63 ft (19 m)
- Draft: 31 ft (9.4 m)
- Propulsion: 2 General Electric D2G reactors, geared turbines, twin propellers, 60,000 hp (45,000 kW)
- Speed: 30+ knots
- Range: Nuclear
- Complement: 39 officers, 539 men
- Sensors & processing systems: AN/SPS-48 3-D Air search radar; AN/SPS-49 2-D Air search radar; AN/SPS-55 surface search radar; AN/SPQ-9 gun fire control radar; AN/SPG-51 Missile fire control radar; AN/SPG-60 Gun/Missile fire control radar
- Electronic warfare & decoys: AN/SLQ-32; Mark 36 SRBOC
- Armament: 2 × MK-26 missile launcher for "Standard" SAMs and ASROC (68 Missiles); 2 × MK-141 Harpoon missile launchers; 2 × Mk-143 armored box launchers for Tomahawk missile ASM/LAM; 2 × triple Mark 32 Surface Vessel Torpedo Tubes; 2 × 5 inch/54 caliber Mk-45 lightweight guns; 2 × 20 mm Phalanx CIWS; 4 × machine guns

USS Texas (DLGN/CGN-39) was the United States Navy's second Virginia-class nuclear guided missile cruiser. She was the third ship of the Navy to be named in honor of the State of Texas. Her keel was laid down on 18 August 1973, at Newport News, Virginia, by the Newport News Shipbuilding and Drydock Company.

She was initially designated a guided missile destroyer leader (DLGN), but was reclassified as a guided missile cruiser and given the hull classification symbol CGN-39 on 30 June 1975, as part of the Navy's ship reclassification plan. She was launched on 9 August 1975, sponsored by Betty Jane Briscoe, wife of Texas Governor Dolph Briscoe, and commissioned on 10 September 1977.

== Service history ==
=== 1977–1982 ===
Following a nine-week test of the ship's combat systems, Texas loaded weapons at the Yorktown Naval Weapons Station in October and underwent refresher training out of Guantánamo Bay, Cuba, in November. Texas spent the first three months of 1978 conducting at-sea evaluation of her propulsion and weapons systems off the Virginia Capes and in the Caribbean. On 28 March, she transited to her building yard at Newport News to commence a Post Shakedown Availability (PSA) which was completed on 31 July. The remainder of 1978 was spent in individual ship exercises off the east coast and Roosevelt Roads, Puerto Rico, interspersed with periods in her home port of Norfolk, Virginia.

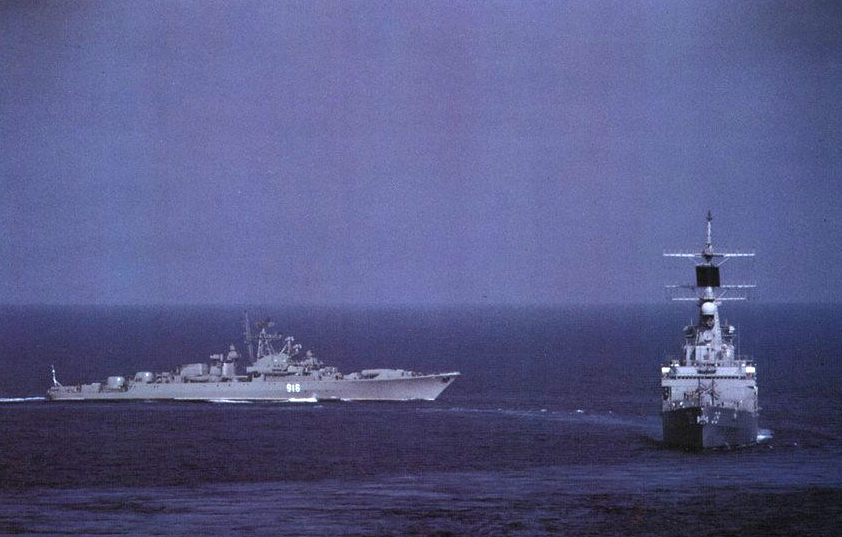
Texas encounters a Soviet Krivak-class frigate in the Mediterranean in 1981

The maiden deployment of Texas was with the USS Nimitz Carrier Battle Group (CBG) in the Mediterranean and North Arabian Seas during the Iranian hostage crisis in support of Operation Eagle Claw. She also served as flagship for Commander, Cruiser-Destroyer Group One. In 1980–81, during a maintenance period she received two 4-cell Harpoon anti-ship missile batteries and two CIWS gun mounts for anti-missile defense. Her second deployment was again with the Nimitz CBG, followed by operations in the Mediterranean. During this period, Texas saw combat for the first time, as she responded to Libyan aggression in the Gulf of Sidra.

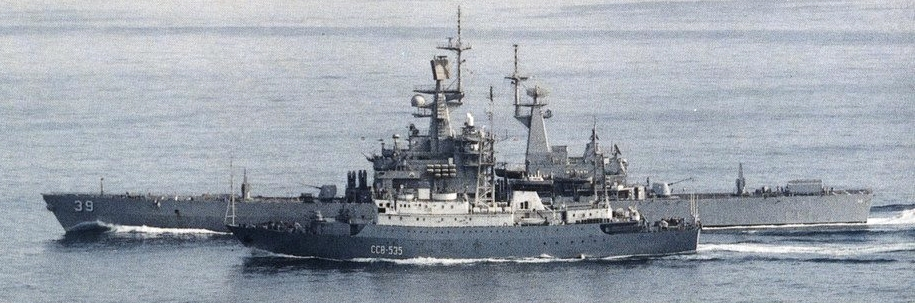
Vishnya-class intelligence ship SSV-535 Kareliya and USS Texas (CGN-39) in 1988

=== 1983–1987 ===
On 1 March 1983 Texas sailed from Norfolk on her third deployment with the USS Carl Vinson Carrier Battle Group (CBG), and included an around-the-world cruise which allowed her to visit every inhabited continent except South America and to sail every ocean except the Arctic. The world cruise also included a change of homeport to San Diego, from Norfolk. Texas spent the first part of the following year operating in the Persian Gulf and Arabian Sea after visits to Saint Thomas, U.S. Virgin Islands, Monaco, Morocco and Cote D'Ivoire. On 1 July 1983 the Carl Vinson CBG arrived at Perth, Australia. Texas, along with attack submarine USS Phoenix (SSN-702) arrived at naval base HMAS Stirling in Rockingham, south of Fremantle, where they stayed until the 7 July before Texas departed, operating independently from the battle group. Her next port of call was Brisbane, Australia, where she arrived on 14 July 1983. On 19 July, while departing the Fisherman Island Wharf, Texas was damaged above the waterline after colliding with the quay, but continued after repairs were made.

On 11 August 1983, anti-nuclear activists marched in Wellington, New Zealand in opposition to a port visit there by Texas. The anti-nuclear movement in New Zealand objected to the US policy of not publicizing which of its ships carried nuclear weapons. Texas visited Albany, Western Australia, anchoring in King George Sound on 29 August 1983 for an R&R visit. She departed on 1 September 1983, returning to San Diego. She then began to make preparations for a homeport change to Alameda, California then went north to Bremerton, Washington, for a Complex Overhaul. She entered dry-dock at Puget Sound Naval Shipyard in September, and remained there until April 1987.

=== 1988–1992 ===
After Dry Dock in Bremerton Washington she returned to its homeport Alameda, California, Texas deployed with the Carl Vinson Carrier Battle Group (CBG) for Westpac 1988 as the Anti-Air Warfare Commander. This, her fourth major deployment, included port visits to Singapore, Subic Bay, Hawaii, Thailand, Hong Kong and Kenya. In 1989, Texas conducted local operations and a short overhaul at Hunters Point Naval Shipyard in San Francisco. By the end of the year, she was back at sea on counter-narcotics operations off the coast of South America.

In February 1991, Texas began her sixth deployment, en route to the Arabian Sea. She served during Operation Desert Storm as the command ship for the Anti-Air Warfare Commander of the Nimitz CBG. Additionally, she served as a base-ship for minesweeping operations off the coast of Kuwait, providing valuable logistic support for several minesweepers. She returned to San Francisco in August of that year. In April 1992, Texas returned to sea and conducted a second counter-narcotics mission that included visits to Ecuador and Panama.

== Early decommissioning ==
Texas was halfway through her mid-life refueling and New Threat Upgrade overhaul and work had just begun on the installation of her new reactor cores in early May 1993, when the decision was made to cancel the work on her and also the planned refueling of her Virginia-class sister-ships. Texas was placed in reserve commission on 31 May 1993, then decommissioned and stricken from the Naval Vessel Register on 16 July 1993 after just 15 years of service. Texas entered the nuclear Ship-Submarine Recycling Program at Puget Sound Naval Shipyard on 1 October 1999. Texas' bow anchor, since December of 1995, has been on display at the Harrod Veterans Memorial Park in Harrod, Ohio.

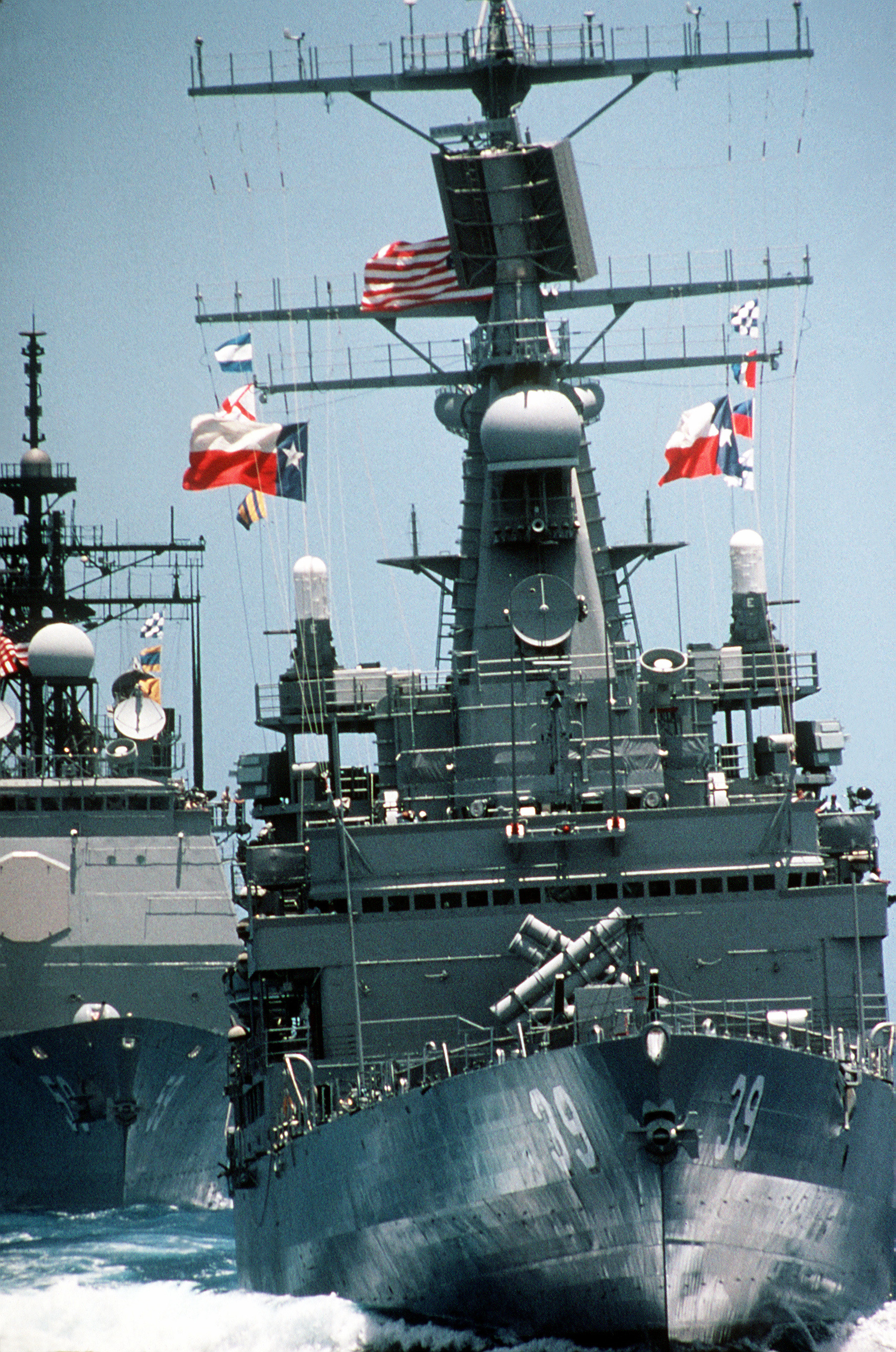
USS Texas leads USS Princeton while flying the state flag of Texas.

== Ship's Crest ==
The official crest of USS Texas CGN 39 was designed by Martha Bell, a freelance graphic designer from Texas. The colors—red, white, and blue—represent the state flag of Texas. The anchor and the fouled line symbolize the Navy, while the Lone Star signifies the state of Texas. The atoms and orbits within the Lone Star represent the nuclear power characteristics of the ship. The three stars at the bottom represent the past United States ships named "Texas". The motto, "Proud Heritage, Proud Purpose", refers to the history and legacy of those ships, and their purpose: defense of the United States.

== See also ==
- Nuclear powered cruisers of the United States Navy
