= USS South Carolina (CGN-37) =

American guided missile cruiser (1975–1999)

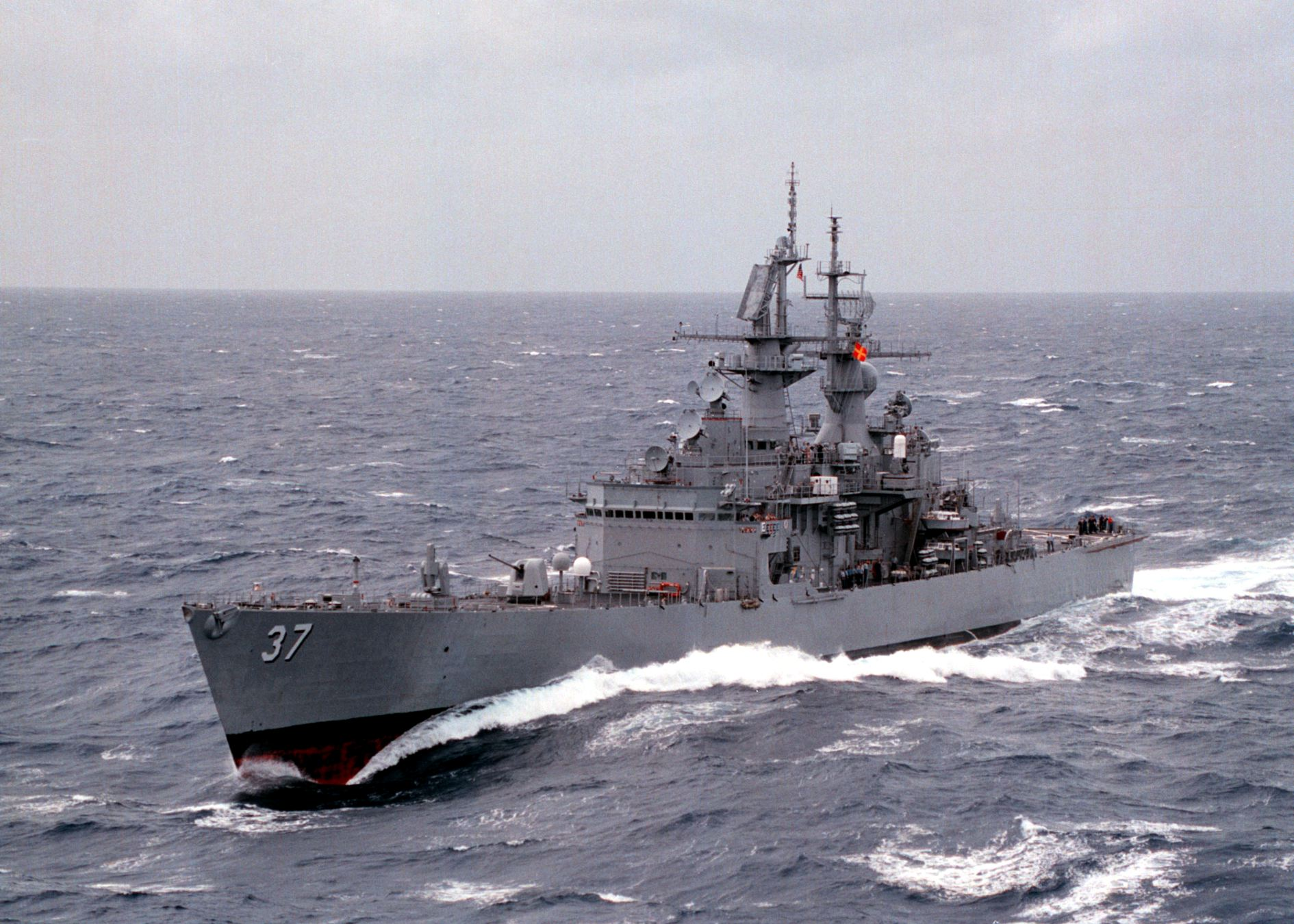
- USS South Carolina underway on 9 October 1997

History

United States
- Name: South Carolina
- Namesake: State of South Carolina
- Ordered: 13 June 1968
- Builder: Newport News Shipbuilding Co.
- Laid down: 1 December 1970
- Launched: 1 July 1972
- Sponsored by: Mrs. J. Fred Buzhardt
- Acquired: 15 November 1974
- Commissioned: 25 January 1975
- Decommissioned: 30 July 1999
- Stricken: 30 July 1999
- Identification: Callsign: NLVQ; Hull number: CGN-37
- Motto: Prepared in mind and in resources
- Fate: Recycling completed 10 May 2010.
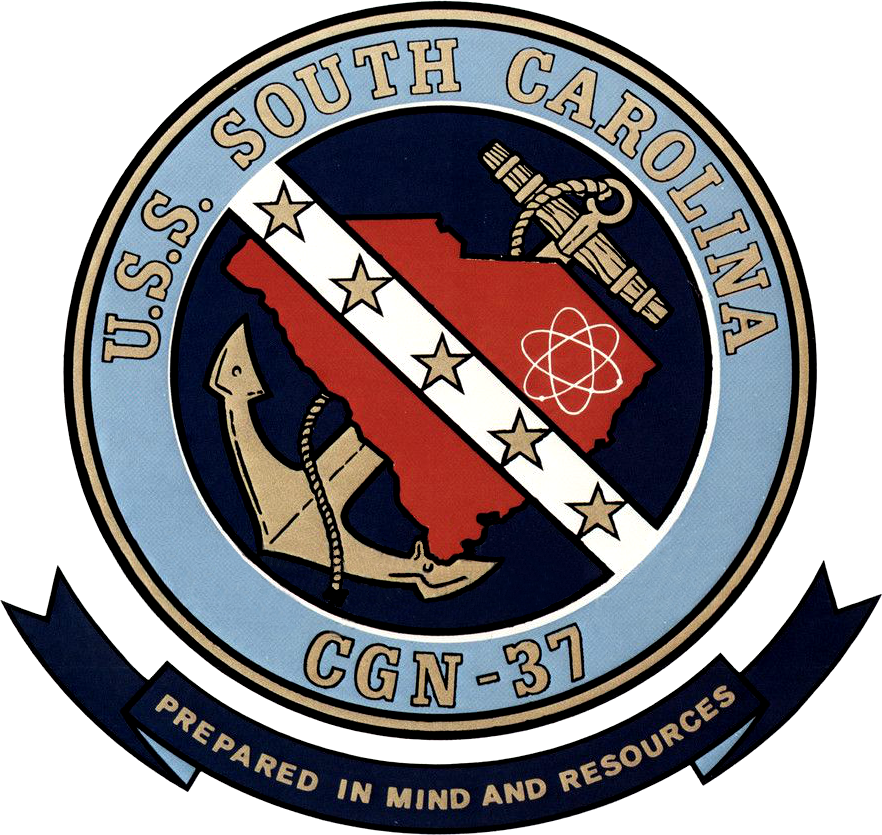
- Badge

General characteristics
- Class & type: California-class cruiser
- Displacement: 10,500 long tons (10,700 t)
- Length: 597 ft (182 m)
- Beam: 61 ft (19 m)
- Draft: 31 ft 6 in (9.60 m)
- Propulsion: 2 × General Electric D2G nuclear reactors
- Speed: 30 knots (56 km/h)+
- Complement: 40 officers and 544 enlisted
- Armament: 2 × Mk 141 Harpoon missile launchers; 2 × 5-inch/54 caliber Mk 45 lightweight guns; 2 × 20 mm Phalanx CIWS; 1 × ASROC missile launcher; 2 × Mk 13 missile launchers for RIM-66 Standard missiles (MR); Mark 46 torpedoes
- Aviation facilities: Helicopter deck aft able to accommodate SH-2 Seasprite LAMPS Mk1, SH-3 Sea King, and CH-46 Sea Knight helicopters. No hangar facility.

USS South Carolina (CGN-37) was the second ship of the California class of nuclear-powered guided missile cruisers in the United States Navy.

USS South Carolina and her sister ship, USS California, were equipped with two Mk-13 launchers, fore and aft, for the RIM-24 Tartar surface-to-air missiles, ASROC missiles, and Harpoon missiles. They were equipped with two 5-inch rapid-fire cannons, fore and aft. Unlike the later Virginia-class cruiser which had a unique arrangement aft of the superstructure, with a flight deck and a below-decks hangar for two LAMPS helicopters, these two cruisers had only a landing pad aft and basic refuelling equipment. There was also a full suite of anti-submarine warfare equipment. Thus, these ships were designed to face all threats, in the air, on the surface, and underwater.

South Carolina was sometimes referred to by her crewmembers as "The Socar" or "The Mighty Socar".

== 1970–1979 ==
South Carolina was launched on 1 July 1972 and commissioned as DLGN-37 on 25 January 1975. She was redesignated CGN-37 six months later in the Navy's major type realignment of 30 June 1975. South Carolina was built at Newport News Shipbuilding Co., Newport News, Virginia. The cruiser's first North Atlantic deployment was to the USS Nimitz Battle Group. After South Carolina participated in Exercise Solid Shield in the Caribbean and completed her first Mediterranean deployment in February 1977. South Carolina in company with her sister ship, California, and the aircraft carrier Nimitz commenced a second Mediterranean deployment in November 1977 and returned to Norfolk, Virginia in July 1978. South Carolina deployed again to the Mediterranean in January 1979 with the Dwight D. Eisenhower Battle Group.

== 1980–1989 ==
In 1980, South Carolina deployed as part of the first Atlantic battle group to spend an entire deployment in the Indian Ocean. After a cruise to the Virgin Islands in November 1981, she was deployed in January 1982 for a six-month deployment with the carrier Dwight D. Eisenhower.

In 1985, South Carolina began a new year by conducting preparatory exercises in the Caribbean. It was deployed to the Mediterranean in March and completed the deployment seven months and 46,500 miles later. South Carolina spent the majority of the deployment on station off Lebanon, in the wake of the hijacking of TWA Flight 847. The cruiser underwent her second extended maintenance period from October 1985 to June 1986. She departed in July 1986 for a North Atlantic cruise, and made port visits to Wilhelmshaven, Germany and Oslo, Norway. Upon her return to Norfolk, she commenced preparations for overseas deployment and got underway on 30 December 1986 with the Nimitz Battle Group. During this deployment, South Carolina returned to her station off Lebanon when British peace emissary Terry Waite was kidnapped in Beirut. In June 1987, just months after the frigate Stark was struck by Iraqi missiles, South Carolina was involved in a tense standoff with Libyan jets in the Gulf of Sidra. A major incident was averted by the use of high powered electronic warfare equipment to jam the jet's radars and Libya fired back only with diplomatic protest.

She conducted joint exercises, entered the Arctic Circle where crew members became a member of the Order of the Blue Nose, and had a port visit to Wilhelmshaven, Germany. During this cruise, British naval historian Eric Grove was an honored guest of the officers and crew. She returned home in October 1988 to make final preparations for deployment.

South Carolina deployed to the Mediterranean in December 1988 with the Theodore Roosevelt Battle Group. During this deployment, helicopters from Helicopter Anti-Submarine Squadron NINE (HS-9) teamed up to rescue the fifteen British crew members from four yachts disabled by heavy weather. The crew members' rescue was broadcast on television in France, Italy and the United Kingdom, and reported worldwide in newspapers. The cruiser returned to Norfolk on 30 June 1989, and began a four-month availability at Norfolk Naval Shipyard following a one-month Caribbean visit in support of operations with the aircraft carrier Forrestal.

== 1990–1998 ==
South Carolina departed 5 January 1990 for Limited Team Training in Guantanamo Bay, Cuba. The cruiser again set sail for the Caribbean on 12 March 1990 for law enforcement operations returning on 13 April 1990 having acted as Coast Guard, COMCARIBRON flagship and making two drug interdictions. South Carolina returned to the Caribbean in July for counter narcotics operations, where she served as flagship for Commander, Joint Task Group 4 and COMCARIBRON.

South Carolina departed 1 October 1990 for operations with the Saratoga Battle Group. Following a solo trans-Atlantic crossing, she transited the Suez Canal for the first time in her history. During Operation Desert Shield, she served as flagship for COMDESRON 24, the Maritime Interdiction Force Commander in the northern Red Sea. South Carolina conducted twenty-seven boardings during Maritime Interdiction Force operations. Admiral Frank Kelso, Chief of Naval Operations, visited South Carolina on station 7 November 1990.

Upon completion of Maritime Interdiction Force operations, South Carolina was selected as the first nuclear-powered warship to visit the Jeddah, Saudi Arabia. In January 1991 South Carolina participated in operations in the Central Mediterranean with the Theodore Roosevelt and America Battle Groups.

The ship sortied early from Taranto, in Italy 17 January 1991 at the start of Operation Desert Storm. South Carolina acted as an Anti-Air Warfare Commander for the Mediterranean, protecting operation Silver Cloud air corridors and the approaches to the Suez Canal. South Carolina acted as on-scene commander and supervised the recovery of four survivors and 29 bodies from the sinking merchant ship Continental Lotus. South Carolina returned to homeport on 28 March 1991. The cruiser entered Norfolk Naval Shipyard for a Combat System New Threat Upgrade and refueling of both reactors and left the shipyard 30 March 1994 with a new lease on life.

Following nuclear refueling, she participated in Operation Able Vigil Forces to assist in the rescue and transport of thousands of Cuban migrants; its crew members were awarded the Coast Guard Unit Commendation.

South Carolina's first post-refueling deployment was to the Straits of Florida during October and November 1994 to rescue Cuban refugees who were fleeing their homeland in hopes of reaching the United States. South Carolina commenced workups in the spring in preparations for her next major deployment.

In the fall of 1995, she started her eleventh deployment. This cruise saw service off the coast of the former republics of Yugoslavia in support of Operations Deny Flight, Sharp Guard, and Decisive Endeavor, which was part of the overall NATO Operation Joint Endeavor. South Carolina acted as "Red Crown" and Air Warfare Commander in the Adriatic Sea, earning the NATO Medal, Meritorious Unit Commendation, and Armed Forces Service Medals. South Carolina returned to homeport in the spring of 1996. South Carolina completed all unit work-up phases and began fleet operations with the George Washington Battle Group in the spring of 1997. From April to June 1997 South Carolina conducted a COMPTUEX with the George Washington Battle Group coordinating and acting as Air Warfare Commander for the largest and most successful surface-to-air missile exercise in the Atlantic fleet. In August 1997, South Carolina participated in Fleetex and completed all preparations for deployment.

In October 1997, the cruiser began its final Mediterranean cruise visiting thirteen ports of call from Haifa, Israel to Naples, Italy and Rota, Spain. She served as the Sixth Fleet Air Warfare Commander and participated in three major NATO exercises. The ship returned to homeport Norfolk in April 1998. Just weeks after returning from the Mediterranean, South Carolina returned to sea for six weeks of Counter Narcotics operations in the South Western Caribbean.

The ship conducted her final port visit in Charleston, South Carolina between 10 and 14 August 1998.

== Decommissioning and memorial ==
South Carolina was deactivated on 4 September 1998. The last of the crew left in July 1999, with the exception of a small contingent to escort her through the Panama Canal and to Bremerton, Washington where she entered the Nuclear Powered Ship and Submarine Recycling Program at Puget Sound Naval Shipyard on 1 October 1999. She was stricken from the Naval Vessel Register on 30 July 1999, and was scrapped on 10 May 2010. In June 2009 her bow, which is 25 feet (7.6 m) long, 18 feet (5.5 m) wide and 16 feet (4.9 m) high, was placed as part of the Puget Sound Memorial Plaza. By April 2010, her nuclear reactor compartments had arrived, by barge via the Columbia River, to the Hanford Site (Hanford Nuclear Reservation) for long term storage. The reactor compartment is the 122nd to be received by Hanford from ex-US Navy ships and submarines.

== Unit awards ==
Based on the Navy Awards site, USS South Carolina (CGN-37) and the vessel's crew members have received the following awards for the specified dates of services (listed in order of precedence of the award):

Surface Warfare; Officer Insignia	Enlisted Surface Warfare; Specialist Insignia

1st Row	Joint Meritorious Unit Award; 15 August 1990 – 12 October 1990		
2nd Row	Navy Unit Commendation; 17 January 1991 – 28 February 1991	Coast Guard Unit Commendation; 19 August 1994 – 23 September 1994 (Operation Able Vigil Forces)	Meritorious Unit Commendation (2 awards / 1 service star); 29 April 1980 – 10 December 1980; 25 August 1995 – 24 February 1996
3rd Row	Battle Efficiency Award (2 awards); 1 January 1993 – 31 December 1993; 1 January 1996 – 31 December 1996	Navy Expeditionary Medal; 29 April 1980 – 8 December 1980	National Defense Service Medal; 23 October 1990 - 28 March 1991
4th Row	Southwest Asia Service Medal (1 campaign star); 23 October 1990 – 11 December 1990	Armed Forces Service Medal (one award for five separate actions); 9 September 1995 - 5 February 1996	Sea Service Deployment Ribbon (11 awards / 2 silver service stars); 11 deployments
5th Row	Coast Guard Special Operations Service Ribbon (2 awards / 1 service star); 21 February 1990 – 25 March 1990; 10 May 1990 – 18 June 1990	NATO Medal for the former Yugoslavia; 9 September 1995 - 5 February 1996	Kuwait Liberation Medal (Kuwait); 23 October 1990 - 11 December 1990

== See also ==
- Nuclear powered cruisers of the United States Navy
