= D1G reactor =

The D1G reactor was a prototype naval reactor designed for the United States Navy to provide electricity generation and propulsion on warships. The D1G designation stands for:

- D = Destroyer platform
- 1 = First generation core designed by the contractor
- G = General Electric was the contracted designer

This prototype nuclear reactor was constructed for the United States Department of Energy's Office of Naval Reactors as part of the Naval Nuclear Propulsion Program. The reactor was built by General Electric and operated by the Knolls Atomic Power Laboratory at the Kesselring Site Operation in West Milton, New York. It was used for testing components and as a training tool for the Nuclear Power Training Unit. The reactor operated from 1962 to 1996, when it was shut down in March of that year. It was later defuelled, with the pressure vessel eventually removed in 2002.

The containment structure — which housed both the primary (nuclear reactor) and secondary (steam plant) systems — is referred to as the "DIG-ball" due to its unique shape: a Horton sphere. The sphere was originally constructed by Chicago Bridge and Iron Works to house the liquid metal cooled reactor of USS Seawolf, with the dome designed to contain a liquid sodium explosion.

In January 2022, a radioactive tank that was used to support the D1G reactor was transported from West Milton, New York to Wampum, Pennsylvania for disassembly. The load was 213 feet long and weighed 294 tons.

== See also ==
- List of United States naval reactors
