= USS Arkansas (CGN-41) =

US Navy guided-missile cruiser

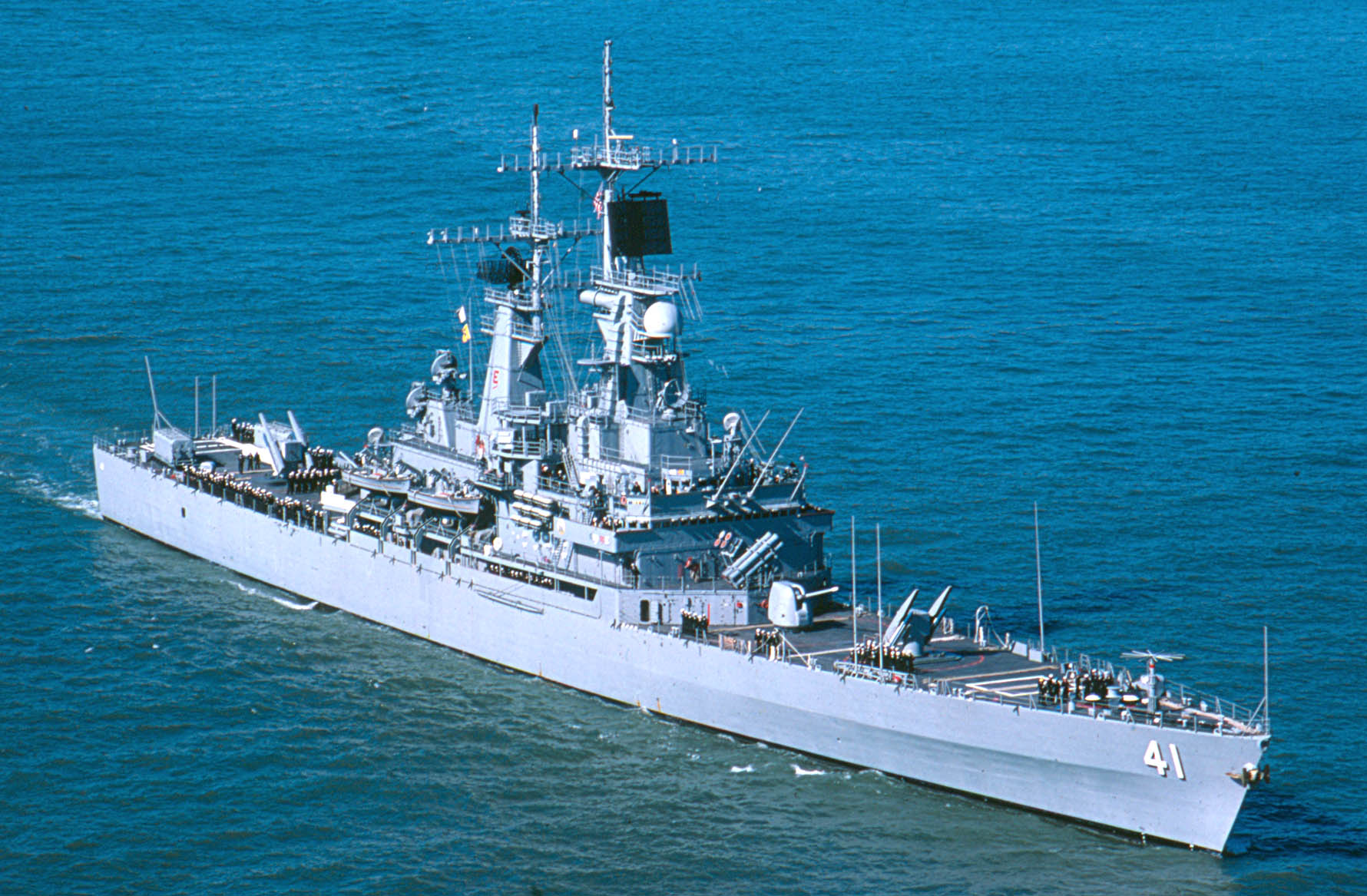
- USS Arkansas underway in 1985

History

United States
- Name: Arkansas
- Namesake: State of Arkansas
- Ordered: 31 January 1975
- Builder: Newport News Shipbuilding and Drydock Company
- Laid down: 17 January 1977
- Launched: 21 October 1978
- Sponsored by: Mrs. Dale Bumpers
- Acquired: 29 September 1980
- Commissioned: 18 October 1980
- Decommissioned: 7 July 1998
- Stricken: 7 July 1998
- Identification: Callsign: NARK; Hull number: CGN-41
- Motto: Defender of Opportunity
- Fate: Disposed of by the Ship-Submarine Recycling Program, completed on 1 November 1999
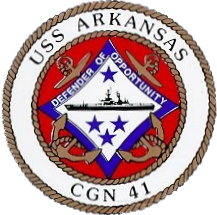
- Badge

General characteristics
- Class & type: Virginia-class cruiser
- Displacement: 9,473 short tons
- Length: 585 ft (178 m)
- Beam: 63 ft (19 m)
- Draft: 30.5 ft (9.3 m)
- Speed: 30+ knots
- Range: Nuclear
- Complement: 473 officers and enlisted men
- Sensors & processing systems: AN/SPS-48 3-D air-search radar; AN/SPS-49 2-D air-search radar; AN/SPS-55 Surface-search radar; AN/SPQ-9 Fire-control radar; AN/SPG-60D Fire-control radar; AN/SPG-51 Missile fire-control radar
- Electronic warfare & decoys: AN/SLQ-32; Mark 36 SRBOC passive chaff launchers
- Armament: Two Mk 26 surface-to-air-missile launchers for Standard Missiles SM-2MR surface-to-air-missiles, or as a sideline, ASROC missiles (held in magazines with a total of 68 missiles); Two Mk-141 Harpoon missile launchers; Two armored box launchers for Tomahawk missiles; Two triple mounts for Mk 46 torpedoes; Two 5 in (130 mm)/54 Mk 45 lightweight naval guns; Two Phalanx CIWS for self-defense against anti-ship missiles
- Armor: none
- Aircraft carried: none

USS Arkansas (CGN-41) was a Virginia-class nuclear-propelled guided-missile cruiser of the U.S. Navy. She was in commission (in active service) from October 1980 through July 1998. Her primary missions were in defending aircraft carrier task forces in air defense (AAW) and antisubmarine warfare (ASW) by using her guided missiles, radar systems, and sonar systems.

For her short-range self-defense, especially for defense against enemy anti-ship missiles, Arkansas carried two automated Phalanx radar-directed 20 millimeters (0.79 in) rapid-fire guns. Also, her two 5-inch rapid-fire naval guns had some capability for anti-aircraft defense.

== Construction ==
The keel of Arkansas was laid on 17 January 1977 at the Newport News Shipbuilding Company in Newport News, Virginia. This warship was launched on 21 October 1978, sponsored by Betty Bumpers, the wife of U.S. Senator Dale Bumpers of Arkansas). She was commissioned into the U.S. Navy on 18 October 1980, with Captain Dennis S. Read as her first commanding officer.

== History ==
USS Arkansas spent the first months following her commissioning in the area of Hampton Roads, Virginia, while detailed, minor shortcomings in her construction were corrected. Late in February 1981, she made a voyage from Virginia to Puerto Rico and back, and then preparations were resumed for her shakedown training. In March, she completed contractor's sea trials, and she carried out a public relations visit to Port Everglades, Florida.

April brought a series of underway qualifications and certifications. On 28 April, Arkansas steamed out from Norfolk to carry out shakedown training in the West Indies. This training cruise included more tests and trials, port visits at several Caribbean Islands, and her first voyage south of the Equator to visit Rio de Janeiro, Brazil, and Recife, Brazil. Arkansas returned to the port of Norfolk on 25 June, and then she began a period of postshakedown availability at the Newport News Shipbuilding Co. Arkansas completed her maintenance and performance upgrades on 15 December, and then she steamed out for three more days of sea trials. She returned to her seaport for shore leave for her crew for the rest of 1981.

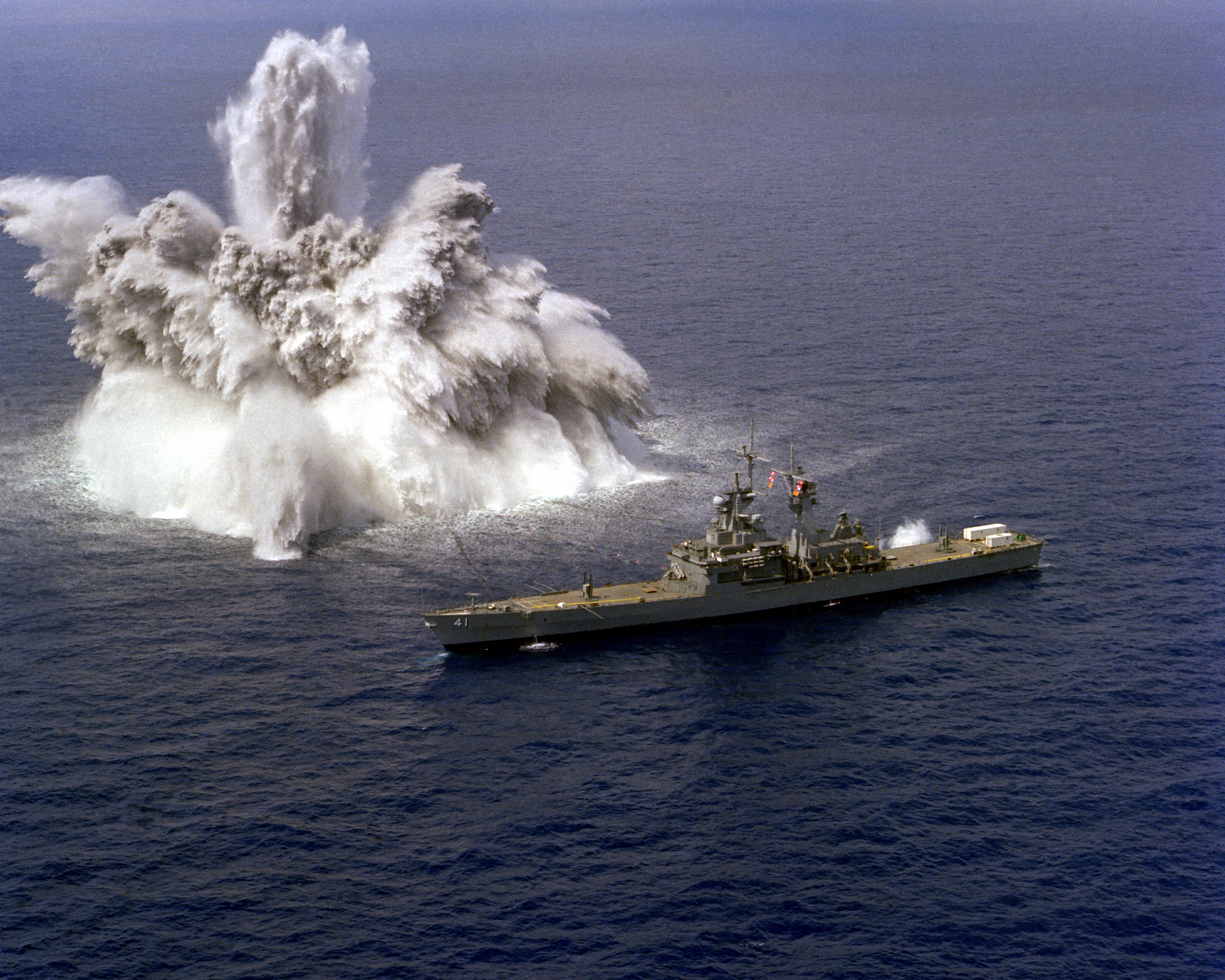
An explosive charge is detonated off the starboard side of the nuclear-powered guided missile cruiser USS Arkansas during a shock test, 17 March 1982

The warship did not get underway again until three weeks into 1982. She put to sea on 22 January and then steamed south to Key West, Florida, where she underwent explosive shock tests. In the intervals between the several tests, Arkansas visited Mayport, Florida, and Port Everglades for work on some of her equipment. Returning north at the beginning of March, she entered the yard at the Newport News Shipbuilding Co. for two months of post-shakedown repairs. Arkansas carried out sea trials on 3 and 4 May, and then she returned to Newport News, for another eleven days to correct minor malfunctions. She arrived back in Norfolk on 20 May, and on the next day, she began local operations from her home port. Over the ensuing four months, Arkansas carried out a schedule of training operations conducted mostly off the Virginia Capes. Two missions, however, took her south to the West Indies. From 23 June to 16 July, the vessel steamed to Guantánamo Bay, Cuba, for refresher training. Between 24 September and 16 October, Arkansas escorted the nuclear aircraft carrier USS Nimitz during an operational readiness exercise that was carried out around Puerto Rico.

Upon her return to Norfolk in mid-October, Arkansas began preparations for her first tour of duty with the 6th Fleet in the Mediterranean Sea. The guided-missile cruiser embarked upon that assignment on 10 November 1982. She completed the transatlantic voyage on 30 November, then set out across the Mediterranean bound for the coast of troubled Lebanon. She arrived on station near Beirut on 6 December. Though Arkansas spent most of her time supporting the multinational force ashore in its efforts to keep peace in Lebanon, she left the eastern Mediterranean occasionally for port calls and to participate in some of the 6th Fleet's freedom-of-navigation maneuvers into the Gulf of Sidra off the coast of Libya. The warship completed her final tour on station near Lebanon on 4 May 1983 and laid in a course for Gibraltar. After a two-day visit to the "Rock," Arkansas got underway for Norfolk on 10 May.

The cruiser stood into her home port again at the end of the third week in May. Norfolk, however, remained her home port only for the duration of her post-deployment stand-down period. On 8 July, Arkansas began the long voyage to her new base of operations at Alameda, California Steaming by way of Port Everglades in Florida and Charlotte Amalie in the U.S. Virgin Islands, she arrived in the Canal Zone on 21 July and transited the Panama Canal on 22 July. From there, the warship headed north to Alameda, reaching her destination on 31 July. She spent the next five weeks at her new home port clearing up incidentals attendant to the shift of bases and carried out nuclear propulsion safety training.

Normal operations at sea resumed during the second week of September and occupied the guided-missile cruiser for the remainder of 1983 and the first six weeks of 1984. Between 12 and 14 February 1984, Arkansas made the passage from Alameda to Bremerton, Washington, where she entered the Puget Sound Naval Shipyard for a three-month repair period. The warship returned to Alameda in mid-May and readied herself for a deployment that became a circumnavigation of the globe. On 1 June, Arkansas put to sea on the first leg of her long voyage. En route to Hawaii, she participated in the multinational exercise Operation RIMPAC 84. She spent the latter half of June conducting exercises in the Hawaiian islands then resumed the voyage west on 2 July. Arkansas arrived at Subic Bay on 20 July and remained in the Philippines until the beginning of August. At that time, she set out for Hong Kong where she visited during the period 6 to 10 August.

From there, Arkansas headed for the Indian Ocean. The guided-missile cruiser served almost three months in the Indian Ocean, primarily in that portion known as the Arabian Sea where the protracted war between Iraq and revolutionary Iran threaten to engulf their neighbors and perhaps involve the superpowers as well. On 1 November, Arkansas entered the Red Sea on her way to the Suez Canal. She passed through the canal on 3 November and, after an expeditious passage, became the first nuclear powered vessel to sail the canal before stopping at Toulon, France, from 7 to 12 November. Returning to sea the next day, the warship shaped a course through the Strait of Gibraltar and across the Atlantic. She rounded out her circumnavigation with calls at the Azores, Barbados and St. Thomas. Arkansas transited the Panama Canal on 9 December and reached Alameda on 17 November.

Post-deployment stand-down kept her in port at Alameda through the end of 1984 and into February 1985. Between 17 and 19 February, Arkansas steamed north to Bremerton for a four-month restricted availability during which she was armed with Tomahawk cruise missiles and the Phalanx CIWS close-in air defense system. Back at Alameda on 25 June, the guided-missile cruiser resumed training operations out of her home port soon thereafter. The usual exercises, inspections and examinations kept her busy through the summer and fall of 1985. On 7 December, the warship began preparations for overseas movement.

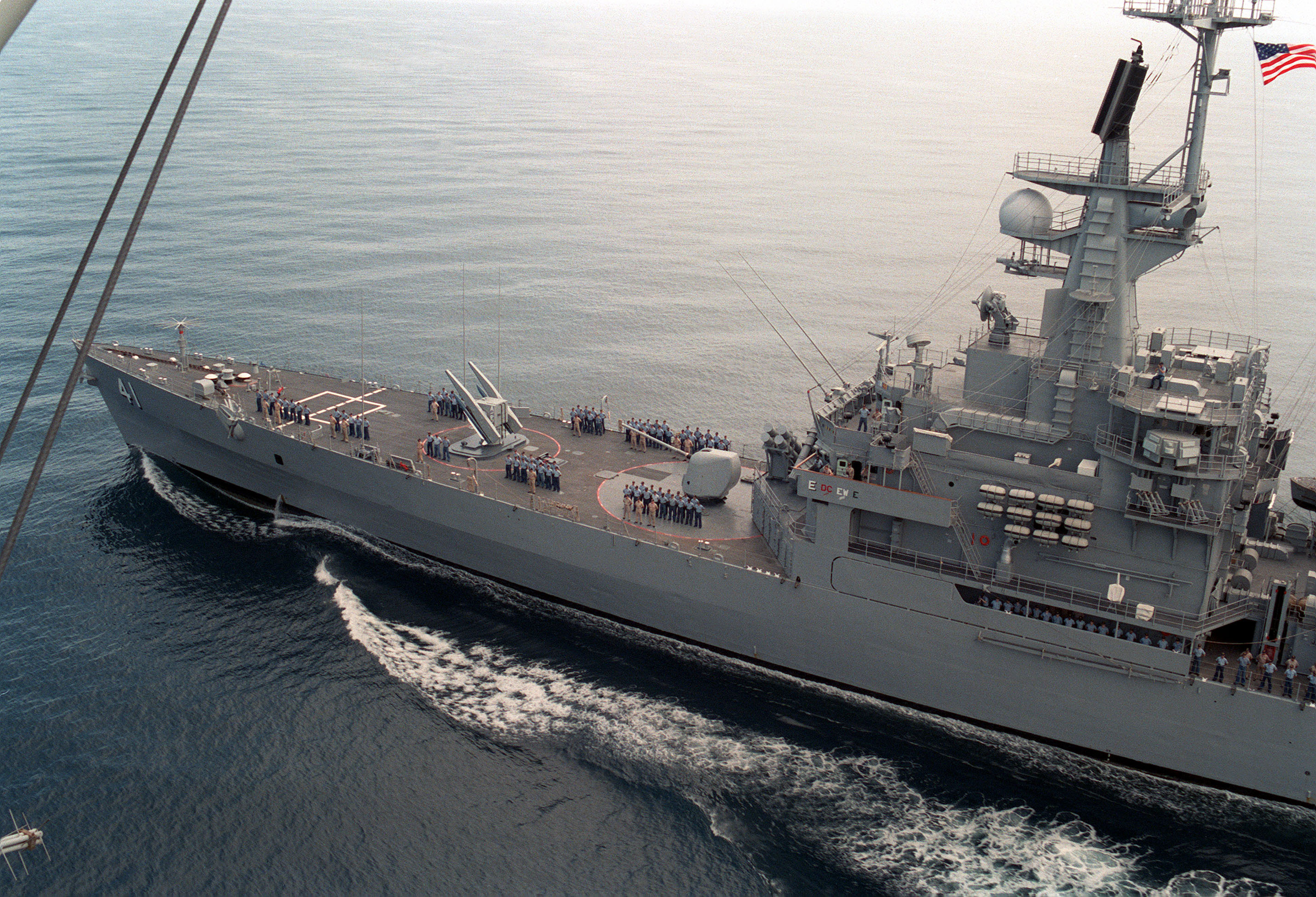
USS Arkansas passing close along the starboard side of the aircraft carrier USS Enterprise in the Pacific Ocean on 9 April 1986

The usual year-end holiday leave and upkeep period interrupted her efforts to get ready for the upcoming deployment, but the guided-missile cruiser put to sea as scheduled on 15 January 1986. Again she participated in exercises during the passage, stopped at Pearl Harbor, and spent only a brief period of time in the western Pacific. By mid-March, after visits to Subic Bay and Singapore, she made her way across the Indian Ocean to Karachi, Pakistan. The guided-missile cruiser called at Karachi between 15 and 20 March then resumed her voyage to the Arabian Sea. Once more, Arkansas patrolled the waters of the troubled Middle East.

However, her sojourn in the Arabian Sea lasted only until late April. On 29 and 30 April, she transited the Suez Canal and headed for another hot spot. During the month of May and June, Arkansas served with the aircraft carrier USS Enterprise and the guided missile cruiser USS Truxtun off the coast of Libya in the wake of the air strikes launched on that country by the United States in reprisal for terrorist activity against Americans. During her stay in the Mediterranean, she paid visits to Monaco and Gaeta, Italy. Arkansas left the Mediterranean at the end of June and shaped a course for Australia. On 4 July, the same day as the Centennial re-dedication of the Statue of Liberty, she held another line-crossing ceremony, somewhere west of Africa. She stopped at Fremantle between 18 and 22 July and then headed for Subic Bay where she laid over for two days at the end of the month. From there, the warship headed for Pearl Harbor, where she paused overnight on 8 and 9 August. She arrived back in her home port on 13 August. Arkansas remained at Alameda until late September for the leave and upkeep period that usually follows an extended tour of duty overseas. Early in October, the warship resumed local operations along the west coast. She remained so occupied for the rest of 1986.

=== 1990s ===
In 1990 Arkansas conducted extended counter-drug operations off the west coast of Central America. Vigilance was rewarded at the conclusion of that deployment as MV Nordkapp carrying 14 tons of cocaine was interdicted near Clipperton Island. Nordkapp was set afire and scuttled by her crew. Arkansas delivered the crew to the US Coast Guard in San Diego where they were subsequently tried and convicted in federal court.

In May 1991, Arkansas deployed to the Persian Gulf as part of the Abraham Lincoln carrier battle group. While en route to the Persian Gulf, Arkansas made a port call at Subic Bay, RP just as Mount Pinatubo erupted in June 1991. Arkansas participated in Operation Fiery Vigil making two voyages from Subic Bay to Cebu transporting military and dependent personnel evacuating from Clark AFB escaping the volcanic activity.

In 1996, Arkansas was part of the Carl Vinson carrier battle group off the coast of Iraq and participated in the Rugged Nautilus exercise and Operation Desert Strike, though for the latter she played a support role as she was not equipped to fire any land-attack missiles.

== Early decommissioning ==
The decision had been made in 1993 to cancel the mid-life refueling overhauls of the Virginia-class cruisers. With the end of the Cold War, the extra costs of the nine nuclear powered cruisers was no longer seen as justified and the later stages of the Vietnam War had heightened concerns about the risks of action damage to nuclear powered surface vessels. Arkansas was decommissioned on 7 July 1998 and entered the US Navy's Nuclear-Powered Ships Recycling Program. She had once been considered for preservation as a museum ship in her namesake state, but as an ocean-going vessel, would not have been able to navigate inland rivers, except during the springtime flood of the Mississippi River.

Arkansas arrived at the Puget Sound Naval Shipyard on 7 July 1998, to begin the recycling process. She ceased to exist on 1 November 1999, with her remains being sold to a scrapyard. As for her two nuclear reactors, they were sent to Hanford for disposal.

Artifacts from Arkansas, including the ship's bell and anchor, are on public display at the Arkansas Inland Maritime Museum in North Little Rock, Arkansas.

Her 16,000 pound bow anchor is on display at the Craighead County courthouse, in Jonesboro, Arkansas.

== See also ==
- Nuclear-powered cruisers of the United States Navy
