= S4W reactor =

American naval reactor plant

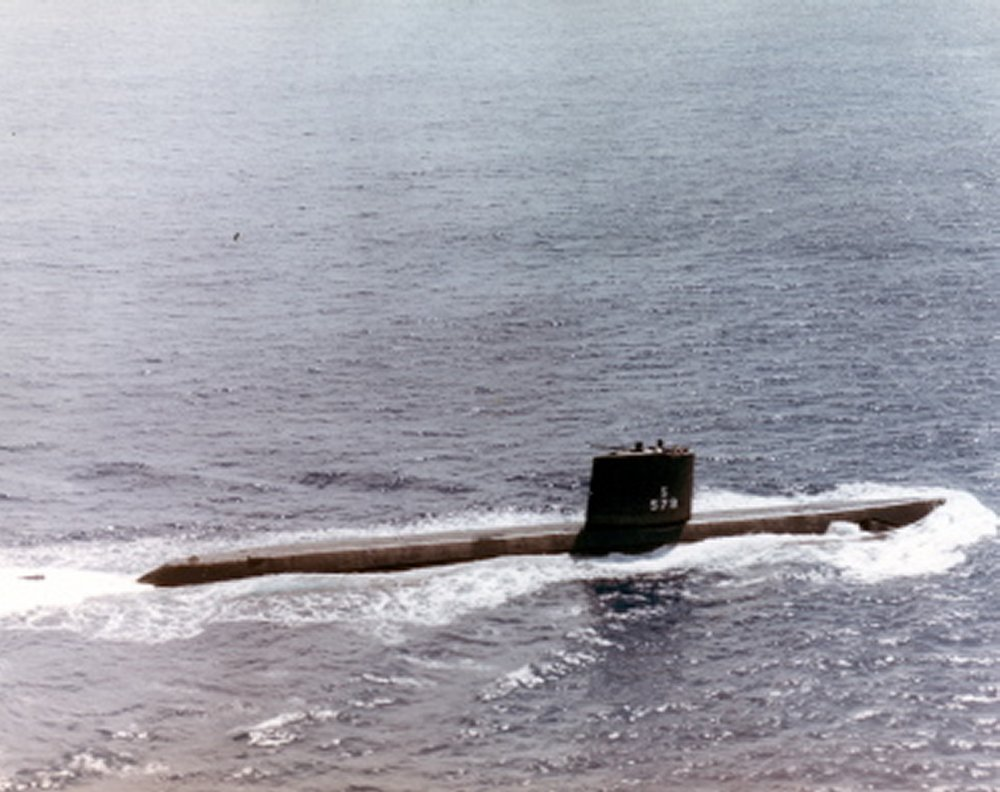
USS Swordfish

The S4W reactor was a naval reactor plant used by the United States Navy to provide electricity generation and propulsion on warships. The S4W designation stands for:

- S = Submarine platform
- 4 = Fourth generation core designed by the contractor
- W = Westinghouse was the contracted designer

This S4W nuclear reactor plant was similar to the S3W, the only difference between them being the design and arrangement of the steam generators and reactor compartments.

Two boats of the Skate class were built with S4W reactor plants: USS Swordfish and USS Seadragon.
