= D2G reactor =

Naval reactor used by the United States Navy

The D2G reactor was a naval reactor used by the United States Navy from 1962 to provide propulsion and electricity generation on warships. Ships powered by the reactor were decommissioned at around the end of the 20th century. The D2G designation stands for:

- D = Destroyer platform
- 2 = Second generation core designed by the contractor
- G = General Electric was the contracted designer

== History ==
Two of these nuclear reactors were installed on each of the Bainbridge, Truxtun, California, and Virginia classes of guided missile cruisers. The only nuclear-powered cruiser in the United States Navy not equipped with a D2G reactor was the world's first nuclear cruiser, the USS Long Beach (CGN-9), which used two C1W reactors.

It is known that USS Bainbridge's reactors were refueled three times, and USS Truxtun's were refueled twice.

== Operation ==
Each D2G reactor was rated for a maximum thermal output of 148 megawatts (198,000 hp), with two steam turbines which drove two shafts, each generating between 30,000 and 35,000 shaft horsepower (22,000 and 26,000 kW). Each reactor was 37 feet (11 m) long, 31 feet (9.4 m) wide, and weighed 1,400 tonnes (1,400 long tons; 1,500 short tons). One reactor was located in the aft of the hull, the other in the fore. The reactors of the California class ships were replaced by 165-megawatt (221,000 hp) D2W reactors in the early 1990s.

== See also ==
- List of United States naval reactors
