= C1W reactor =

Nuclear reactor

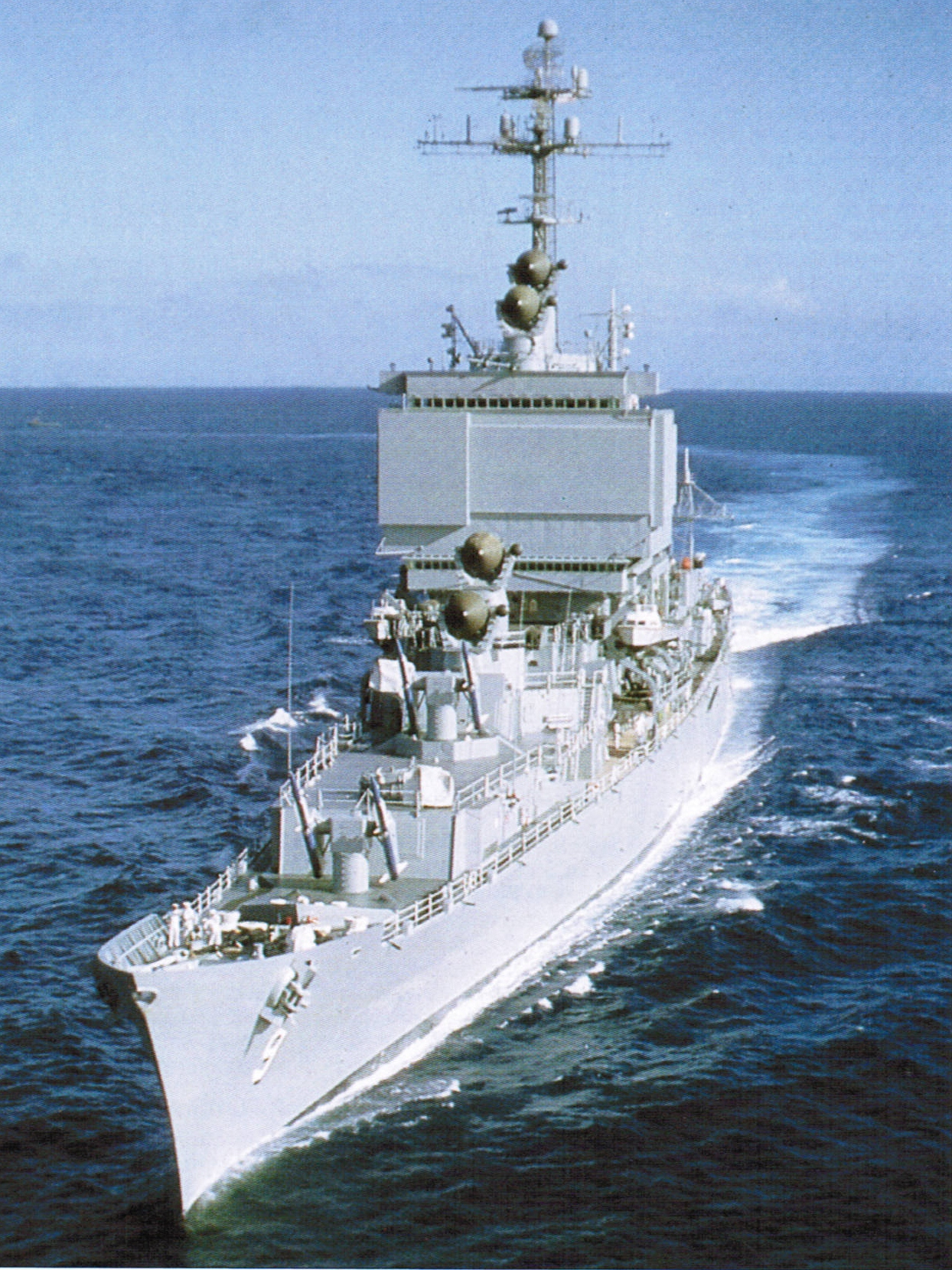
USS Long Beach

The C1W reactor is a nuclear reactor used by the United States Navy to provide electricity generation and propulsion on warships. C1W reactors, like all United States Naval reactors, are pressurized water reactors. The C1W designation stands for:

- C = Cruiser platform
- 1 = First-generation core designed by the contractor
- W = Westinghouse was the contracted designer

This type of nuclear propulsion plant was used exclusively on the Long Beach-class guided missile cruiser, the world's first nuclear-powered cruiser. The C1W was the only nuclear reactor ever designed specifically for a cruiser (two of them, powering two geared turbines) with all subsequent nuclear cruisers powered by "D"-class (or destroyer-type) reactors.

USS Long Beach, commissioned in September 1961, was decommissioned in May 1995.

== See also ==
- List of United States naval reactors
