= Skate-class submarine =

United States Navy submarine class

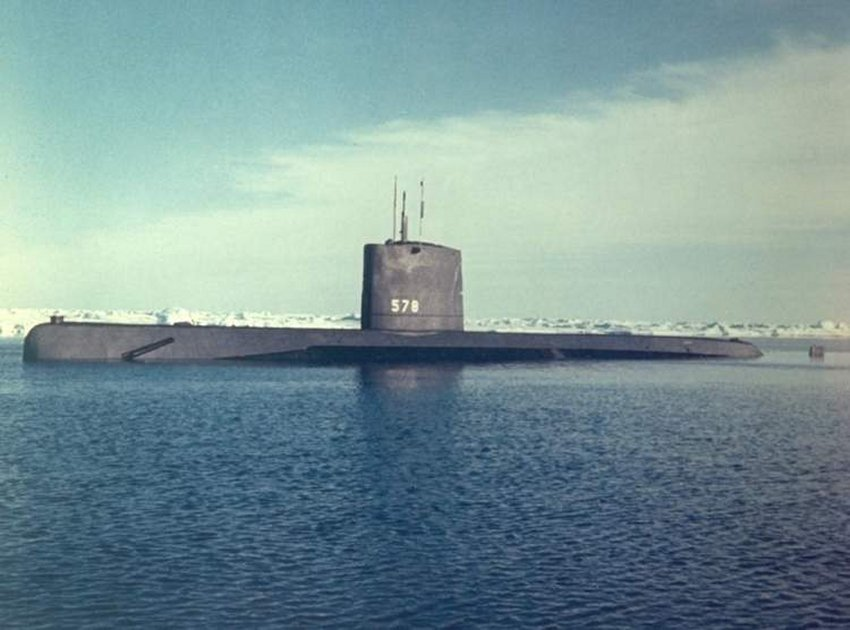
- USS Skate with an ice pack behind her

Class overview
- Name: Skate class
- Builders: General Dynamics Electric Boat; Portsmouth Naval Shipyard; Mare Island Naval Shipyard
- Operators: United States Navy
- Preceded by: USS Nautilus; USS Seawolf; Tang class; USS Darter
- Succeeded by: Skipjack class; Barbel class
- Built: 1955–1959
- In commission: 1957–1989
- Completed: 4
- Retired: 4

General characteristics
- Type: Nuclear submarine
- Displacement: 2,250 long tons (2,290 t) surfaced; 2,850 long tons (2,900 t) submerged
- Length: 267 ft 7 in (81.56 m)
- Beam: 25 ft (7.6 m)
- Draft: 21 ft 3 in (6.48 m)
- Propulsion: S3W nuclear reactor in S3W or S4W plant, geared steam turbines, two shafts, 6,600 shp (4,900 kW)
- Speed: 18 kn (33 km/h; 21 mph) surfaced; 22 kn (41 km/h; 25 mph) submerged
- Test depth: 700 ft (210 m)
- Complement: 84 officers and enlisted
- Armament: 8 × 21-inch (533 mm) torpedo tubes (6 forward, 2 aft); 22 torpedoes (18 forward, 4 aft)

The Skate-class submarines were the United States Navy's first production run of nuclear-powered submarines. They were an evolution of the Tang class in everything except their propulsion plants, which were based on the operational prototype USS Nautilus. The four Skate class boats re-introduced stern torpedo tubes. Although among the smallest nuclear-powered attack submarines ever built, the Skate class served for many years, with the last being decommissioned in 1989. USS Skate was the first submarine to surface at the North Pole, on 17 March 1959.

Skate and Sargo were built with the S3W reactor, Swordfish and Seadragon also had the S3W reactor in the S4W reactor plant (same machinery in an alternate arrangement).

== Design ==
The Skate class were designed under project SCB 121 as economical production nuclear-powered submarines (SSNs), and thus were smaller and more austere than their ground-breaking predecessor Nautilus, whose high cost had raised concerns. They were designed before Nautilus demonstrated the advantages of sustained high underwater speed, thus their designed speed was about the maximum speed of the conventional Tang class, which had a similar displacement to the Skates. Their S3W reactor was a scaled-down version of Nautilus' S2W reactor with about half the power output; it was known as SFR (Submarine Fleet Reactor) during development. A slightly modified version known as S4W powered the second pair of Skate-class boats. Unfortunately, scaling down the reactor did not reduce the weight of reactor shielding proportionally, and it was eventually realized that further downsizing was impractical. In the late 1950s it was hoped that the nuclear-powered aircraft program would develop reactors suitable for very small SSNs, but the program was unsuccessful. Their armament was the same as the Tangs, six bow and two stern 21 inch (533 mm) torpedo tubes. Like the Tangs, the stern tubes had no ejection pump, and could only be used for swim-out weapons such as the Mark 37 ASW homing torpedo. The quest for a high submerged speed and improved sonar led to the subsequent Skipjack and Thresher classes becoming the model for further development.

== Service ==
Skate was notable as the first submarine to surface at the North Pole, on 17 March 1959. A previous attempt in 1958 had resulted in no suitable place found for surfacing near the Pole. Sargo and Seadragon also conducted significant polar operations in their careers. This class was the most suited for ice breakthrough attempts until the Sturgeon class, with fairwater planes that could be rotated vertically, entered service beginning in 1967. After 25–30 years each of successful service, mostly out of Pearl Harbor, the class was retired in the 1980s and disposed of through the Navy's nuclear Ship-Submarine Recycling Program.

== Boats in class ==
Name	Hull no.	Builder	Laid down	Launched	Commissioned	Decommissioned	Period of service	Fate
Skate	SSN-578	Electric Boat	21 July 1955	16 May 1957	23 December 1957	12 September 1986	28.7	Recycled March 1995
Swordfish	SSN-579	Portsmouth Naval Shipyard	25 January 1956	27 August 1957	15 September 1958	2 June 1989	30.4	Recycled September 1995
Sargo	SSN-583	Mare Island Naval Shipyard	21 February 1956	10 October 1957	1 October 1958	21 April 1988	29.6	Recycled April 1995
Seadragon	SSN-584	Portsmouth Naval Shipyard	20 June 1956	16 August 1958	5 December 1959	12 June 1984	24.5	Recycled September 1995
