= USS Skate (SSN-578) =

Submarine of the United States

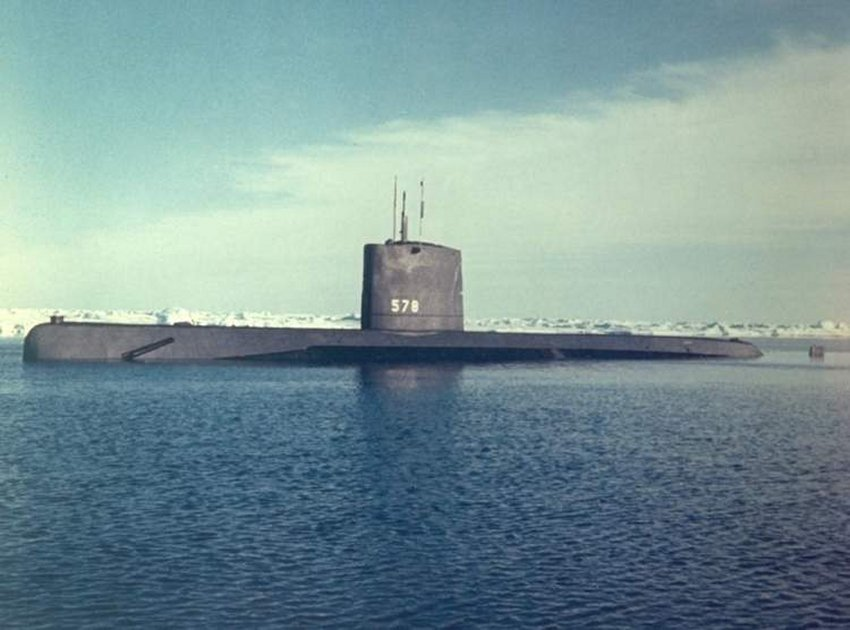
- Skate with an ice pack behind her

History

United States
- Name: USS Skate
- Ordered: 18 July 1955
- Builder: Electric Boat
- Laid down: 21 July 1955
- Launched: 16 May 1957
- Sponsored by: Mrs Lewis L. Strauss
- Commissioned: 23 December 1957
- Decommissioned: 12 September 1986
- Stricken: 30 October 1986
- Home port: New London, Connecticut, Submarine Tender USS Fulton (AS-11)
- Fate: Disposed of by submarine recycling 6 March 1995

General characteristics
- Class & type: Skate-class submarine
- Displacement: 2,550 long tons (2,591 t) surfaced; 2,848 long tons (2,894 t) submerged
- Length: 267 ft 7 in (81.56 m)
- Beam: 25 ft (7.6 m)
- Propulsion: S3W reactor
- Speed: 15.5 knots (17.8 mph; 28.7 km/h) surfaced; 18 kn (21 mph; 33 km/h) submerged
- Complement: 8 officers and 76 men
- Armament: 8× 21 in (530 mm) torpedo tubes (6 forward, 2 aft)

USS Skate (SSN-578), the third submarine of the United States Navy named for the skate, a type of ray, was the lead ship of the Skate class of nuclear submarines. She was the third nuclear submarine commissioned, the first to make a completely submerged trans-Atlantic crossing, the second submarine to reach the North Pole, and the first to surface there.

== Construction and commissioning ==
The contract to build Skate was awarded to the Electric Boat division of General Dynamics on 18 July 1955, and her keel was laid in Groton, Connecticut, on 21 July 1955. She was launched on 16 May 1957, sponsored by Alice Hanauer Strauss, wife of Lewis L. Strauss, and commissioned on 23 December 1957 with Commander James F. Calvert in command.

== Operational history ==
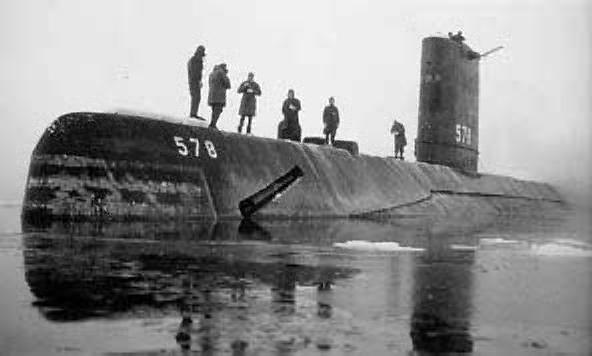
USS Skate in August 1958, possibly at Drifting Ice Station Alfa

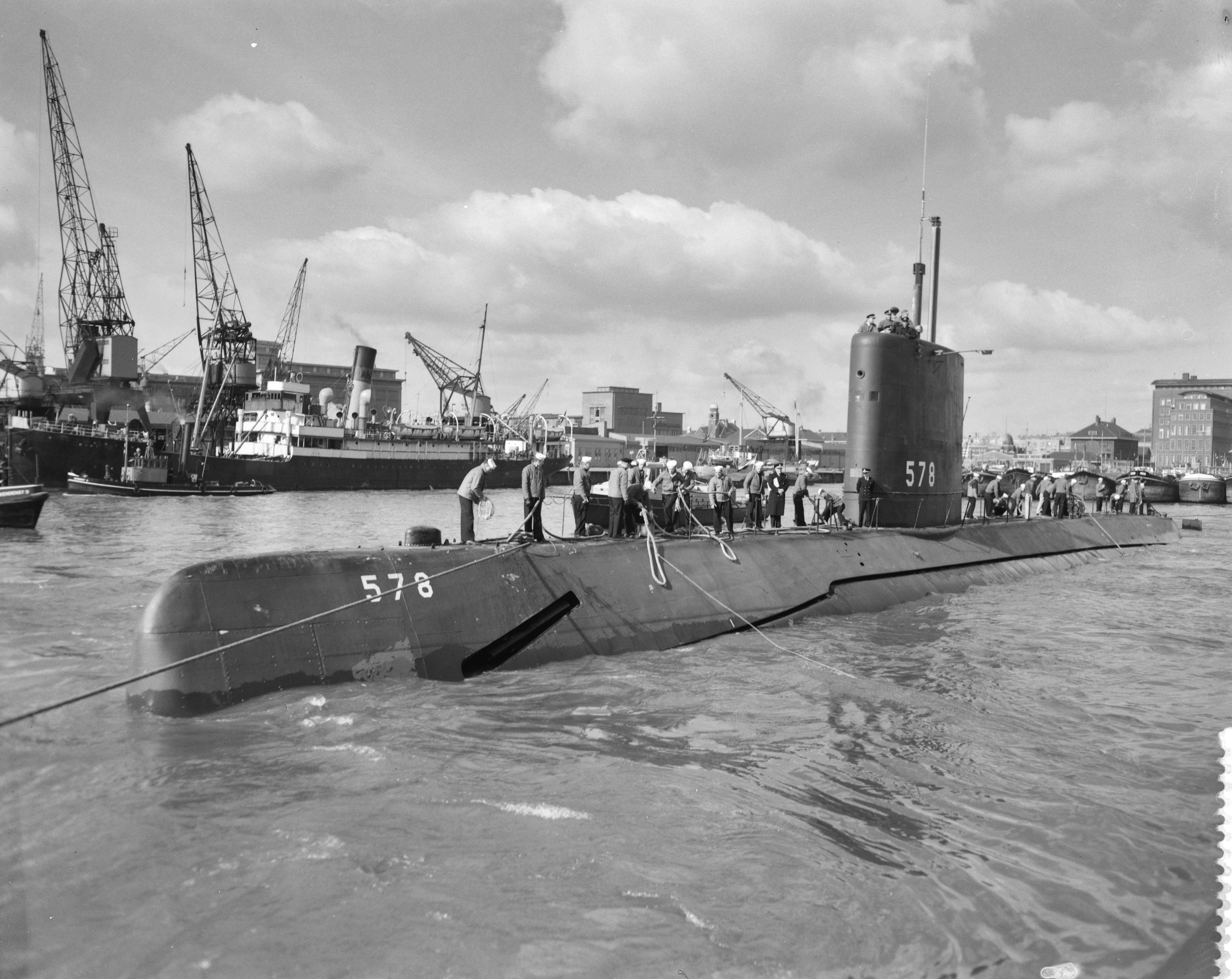
USS Skate in the Dutch port of Rotterdam, March 1958

Skate conducted shakedown training out of New London, Connecticut until 29 January 1958, when she cruised to the Bermuda operating area, then returned to her home port on 8 February. Sixteen days later, the nuclear powered submarine set a course for the Isle of Portland, England. Before returning home, she had also visited ports in France and the Netherlands.

=== First visit to North Pole ===
On 30 July, Skate sought the Arctic where she operated under the ice for 10 days. During this time, she surfaced nine times through the ice, navigated over 2,400 miles (3,900 km) under it, and on 11 August, 9:47 pm EDT (the week after USS Nautilus) became the second sea ship to reach the North Pole. Skate was unable to surface precisely at the Pole on the August voyage due to dangerous ice conditions as noted in the captain's 1960 book, Surface at the Pole: The Extraordinary Voyages of the USS Skate, where Calvert said, "Seldom had the ice seemed so heavy and so thick as it did in the immediate vicinity of the pole. For days we had searched in vain for a suitable opening to surface in." The closest was to make radio contact at the surface from a polynya around 30 nm away, but not to surface fully owing to the risk of damage from ice. Skate did manage to surface and make contact with Drifting Ice Station Alpha at 85ºN, 300 nm away.

After being denied access to visit Copenhagen in Denmark, she sailed into Bergen, Norway on 23 August. There she was inspected by king Olav V of Norway, US ambassador Frances E. Willis and minister of defence Nils Handal. The submarine made port calls in the Netherlands, Belgium, and France before returning to New London on 25 September 1958. In recognition of the dangerous and historic feat, the Skate and its crew were given the Navy Unit Commendation award for "... braving the hazards of the polar ice pack...."

=== Second visit to North Pole ===
While the Skate was unable to surface on its first voyage to the pole, on 17 March 1959, she became the first submarine to surface at the North Pole. Calvert described the historic moment in his book, saying, "Slowly we blew the tanks and the Skate moved reluctantly upward. It was apparent we were under heavier ice here than any we had experienced before." While at the pole, Calvert and the crew planted an American flag in a cairn they built out of ice blocks, and put a waterproof container in the cairn with a note commemorating the event. The crew also held a ceremony for the late Arctic explorer Sir Hubert Wilkins and committed his ashes at the pole. In 1931, Sir Hubert had conducted an Arctic expedition in the disarmed research submarine Nautilus (ex-USS O-12). After reaching the Pole, the Skate continued its mission to pioneer arctic operations during periods of extreme cold and maximum ice thickness. When the submarine returned to port, she was awarded a bronze star in lieu of a second Navy Unit Commendation for demonstrating "for the first time the ability of submarines to operate in and under the Arctic ice in the dead of winter". In the fall of 1959 and in 1960, Skate participated in exercises designed to strengthen American antisubmarine defenses.

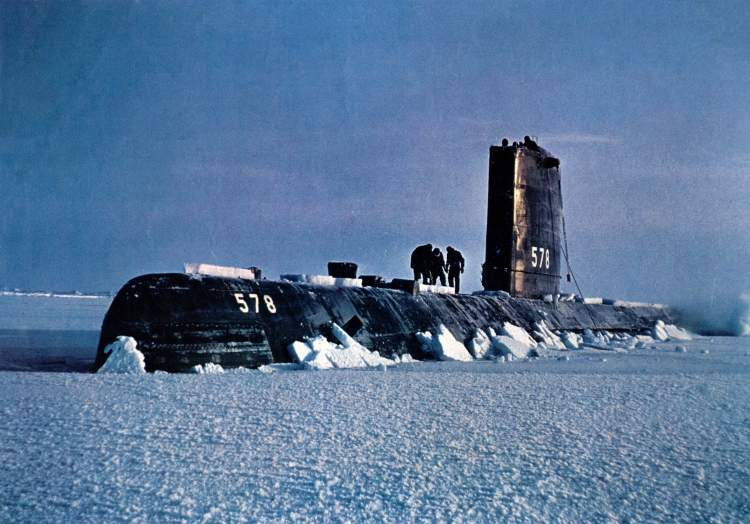
USS Skate surfaced in Arctic – 1959

Skate returned to General Dynamics in January 1961 for a regular overhaul and to have her reactor refueled for the first time. She put to sea in August and, for the next 11 months, conducted exercises to increase the operational readiness of her crew.

=== Third visit to North Pole ===
On 7 July 1962, Skate again set course towards the North Pole. Five days later, USS Seadragon, did likewise from Pearl Harbor. The two submarines made their rendezvous on 31 July. After meeting, they operated together for over a week. Both submarines surfaced at the North Pole on 2 August and official greetings and insignia of Submarine Force Atlantic Fleet and Submarine Force Pacific Fleet were exchanged.

=== Later years ===
Skate returned to New London and performed fleet and local operations for the next several years. She entered the Norfolk Naval Shipyard on 28 April 1965, the first nuclear submarine overhauled there, for nuclear refueling and installation of the SUBSAFE package. Skate was the first submarine to finish this major conversion program, which was instituted after the loss of USS Thresher in 1963. The process was not completed until September 1967.

After sea trials and a shakedown cruise in the Caribbean, the submarine returned to New London and participated in exercises involved in the development of new undersea tactics and equipment.

In October 1968, Skate was deployed to the Mediterranean where she operated with the Sixth Fleet for two months. The polar veteran operated under the Arctic ice again in March and April 1969, in October 1970, and in February 1971 . The remainder of her at sea time was spent in various Atlantic Fleet and NATO exercises. In July 1971, she began her third regular overhaul at the Norfolk Naval Shipyard and did not return to New London until 17 November 1973. In August 1974, Skate operated as a unit of the Atlantic Fleet.

In late 1977, Skate transferred to Pearl Harbor, where she joined the other three Skate-class submarines as a member of Submarine Squadron 7.

=== Decommissioning ===
Skate was decommissioned on 12 September 1986, stricken from the Naval Vessel Register on 30 October 1986, and disposed of by submarine recycling at Puget Sound Naval Shipyard on 6 March 1995.

== Awards ==
- Navy Unit Commendation with one star (2 awards)
- Meritorious Unit Commendation with two stars (3 awards)

Skate′s first Navy Unit Commendation was for the period 9 through 12 August 1958 and the second for the period 4 March through 6 April 1959. Her Meritorious Unit Commendations were for the periods 24 March through 15 April 1969, 12 October through 18 November 1970, and 26 February through 9 March 1971.
