= USS Sargo (SSN-583) =

Submarine of the United States

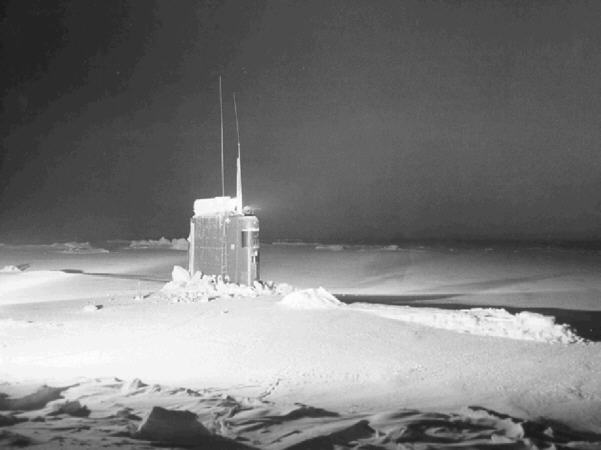
- USS Sargo surfaced at the North Pole on 9 February 1960

History

United States
- Name: USS Sargo
- Namesake: The Sargo, a food and game fish of the Porgy family
- Ordered: 29 September 1955
- Builder: Mare Island Naval Shipyard
- Laid down: 21 February 1956
- Launched: 10 October 1957
- Sponsored by: Mrs. Frank T. Watkins
- Commissioned: 1 October 1958
- Decommissioned: 21 April 1988
- Stricken: 21 April 1988
- Motto: Two Screws Are Better Than One
- Fate: Recycled 1995

General characteristics
- Class & type: Skate-class submarine
- Displacement: 2,580 long tons (2,620 t) surfaced; 2,861 long tons (2,907 t) submerged
- Length: 267 ft 7 in (81.56 m)
- Beam: 25 ft (7.6 m)
- Draft: 22 ft 5 in (6.83 m)
- Propulsion: S3W reactor
- Speed: 23 knots (26 mph; 43 km/h)
- Complement: 95 officers and men
- Armament: 8 × 21 in (530 mm) torpedo tubes (6 forward, 2 aft)

USS Sargo (SSN-583), a Skate-class nuclear-powered submarine, was the second ship of the United States Navy to be named for the sargo, a food and game fish of the porgy family, inhabiting coastal waters of the southern United States.

== Construction and commissioning ==
The contract to build Sargo was awarded to Mare Island Naval Shipyard in Vallejo, California, on 29 September 1955 and her keel was laid down on 21 February 1956. She was launched on 10 October 1957, sponsored by the wife of Rear Admiral Frank T. Watkins, and commissioned on 1 October 1958 with Commander Daniel P. Brooks in command.

== Operational history ==
Prior to completion, Sargo was designated for an Arctic cruise. She received alterations to strengthen her sail before she left the building yard. Further modifications followed her 19,000-mile (35,200 km) Pacific shakedown cruise. After her arrival at her home port, Pearl Harbor, on 1 October 1959, scientific instruments were installed to assist her in navigating under the shifting polar ice with its potentially hazardous submerged pressure ridges; in locating open leads and thin ice through which to surface, and in gathering oceanographic and hydrographic data. November and December 1959 brought intensive training programs and the embarkation of scientific specialists; and, on 18 January 1960, Sargo, under the command of Lieutenant Commander J.H. Nicholson, cleared Pearl Harbor and headed north to make a submerged exploration of the Arctic Ocean.

By 25 January, Sargo had reached the vicinity of St. Matthews Island where she found ice, block and brash and where, after rendezvousing with the United States Navy icebreaker USS Staten Island (AGB-5) she made her first stationary dive while surrounded by ice. On 29 January, she passed the Diomede Islands and crossed the Arctic Circle; and, on 9 February, she arrived under the North Pole.

Making her first pass under the pole at 0934, the submarine began a clover-leaf search for thin ice and at 1049 she surfaced, according to her log, 25 feet (8 m) from the pole. Later the same day, the Hawaiian flag was raised at the pole, and, on the morning of 10 February, Sargo submerged and set a course for the Canadian Arctic Archipelago and a rendezvous with ice island T-3.

Collecting hydrographic data as she progressed, she reached T-3 on 17 February. Thence, after conducting tests in cooperation with scientists on the ice island, she got underway for the Bering Strait, the Aleutian Islands, and Hawaii. On 3 March 1960, Sargo, having covered over 11,000 miles (20,000 km), 6,003 miles (11,118 km) under ice, returned to Pearl Harbor with new data on Arctic ice, Arctic waters, and the physiography of the Arctic Basin. The latter included information on Alpha Ridge and on the presence of deep water areas at the western end of the northwest passage. For this cruise the Sargo earned the Navy Unit Commendation, the second highest award possible for a ship of the United States Navy.

Repairs took Sargo into April. At the end of that month, she resumed operations in the Hawaiian area with a demonstration cruise for the King of Nepal.

On 14 June, the submarine was docked in Pearl Harbor, preparing to take Bhumibol Adulyadej and his wife Mom Rajawongse Sirikit Kitiyakara, the King and Queen of Thailand on a cruise the next day. Sargo was charging her oxygen tanks when the oxygen line, which entered the submarine through the stern torpedo room hatch, developed a leak and a fire ignited. Two Mark 37 torpedo warheads detonated "low-order", and the fire spread dramatically, killing the crewman tending the oxygen line, machinist's mate third class James E. Smallwood. The fire, fed by the pressurized oxygen, shot flames over 100 feet (30 m) in the air through the hatch. When the combined forces of the shipyard and the boat's crew were unable to control the fire, Sargo's officers took the submarine a short distance from the dock and dove with the stern room hatch open. The fire was extinguished, and Sargo bottomed in the channel. A floating crane raised the Sargo, and repairs took three months in drydock.

James E. Smallwood MM3(SS), lost his life in the fire while taking action to save the ship. He was awarded, posthumously, the Navy and Marine Corps Medal for his heroic actions and other crew members were also awarded medals and letters of commendation for outstanding courage over and above the call of duty. On 15 April 1987, Submarine Base Pearl Harbor opened a new 17-story Bachelor Enlisted Quarters, which was dedicated on 26 February 1988 in the memory of Smallwood and the sacrifice of his life while performing in the service of his country.

From October through December 1960, Sargo again conducted type training exercises.

In 1961 Sargo assumed a more regular schedule. On 19 January, she sailed for the Philippines on her first deployment with the Seventh Fleet. In the western Pacific into May, she participated in exercises to enhance the antisubmarine warfare readiness of hunter-killer groups and visited Sydney, for the 19th Annual Coral Sea Celebration. On 25 May, she returned to Pearl Harbor. Upkeep and local operations took her into late July, when she began a two-month training cruise. In November, she moved east, to California, to participate in a demonstration for the Chief of Naval Operations and foreign attaches. She then returned to Pearl Harbor for holiday leave and upkeep. During the late winter and early spring of 1962, Sargo made another extended cruise in the western Pacific, again earning a Navy Unit Commendation for her effort.

Local operations and upkeep followed her return to Pearl Harbor; and, in July, she entered the naval shipyard there for an overhaul which lasted through the winter of 1962 and 1963. During the work, she became the first nuclear ship to be refueled at that shipyard. In mid-summer 1963, she commenced an extended cruise to the western Pacific, and, in October she returned to Hawaii for six months of local operations.

From April to October 1964, Sargo once again deployed to the western Pacific; and, during August, she was called on to support operations resulting from the Gulf of Tonkin Incident. After her return to Hawaii, local operations and upkeep took her into the next year. In April 1965, she commenced another cruise in the western Pacific, and, in June, she resumed operations in the eastern Pacific. Five months later, she again moved westward across the Pacific; and, in February 1966, she returned to Hawaii to enter the naval shipyard at Pearl Harbor where she remained for the next two years, undergoing overhaul and refueling. Between 1963 and 1965 Sargo earned three more Navy Unit Commendations.

On 5 April 1968, Sargo left the shipyard. She had been overhauled and her third reactor core had been installed. Refresher training followed and, in June she resumed her previous schedule with an extended cruise in the western Pacific. Since that time, into 1974, she has maintained a schedule of eastern and western Pacific cruises and training operations, including joint British, Australian, and American exercises in the South China Sea in January 1969.

[1969–1988]

== Decommissioning and disposal ==
Decommissioned and stricken from the Naval Vessel Register on 21 April 1988, ex-Sargo entered the Navy's Nuclear-Powered Ship and Submarine Recycling Program on 14 April 1994; recycling was completed on 5 April 1995.
