= Machinist's mate =

Rating in the U.S. Navy

Machinist's Mate
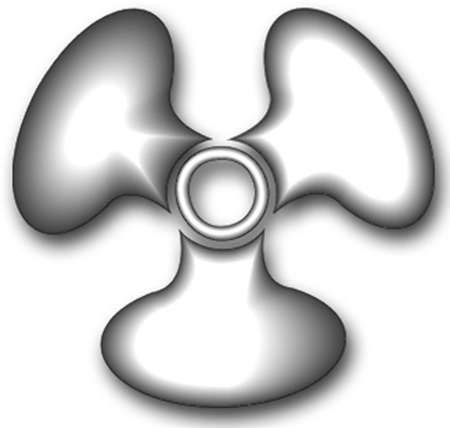
- Rating insignia
- Issued by: United States Navy
- Type: Enlisted rating
- Abbreviation: MM
- Specialty: Engineering / Weapons

Machinist's Mate (or MM) is a rating in the United States Navy's engineering community. It is non-capitalized as machinist's mate when discussing the generic rating rather than as a proper noun when discussing a specific enlisted seaman (Machinist's Mate Jane Doe, MM John Doe) carrying that rating.

== Description ==
According to the Bureau of Naval Personnel (BUPERS), the job of a Machinist's Mate is to "operate, maintain, and repair (organizational and intermediate level) ship propulsion machinery, auxiliary equipment, and outside machinery, such as: steering engine, hoisting machinery, food preparation equipment, refrigeration and air conditioning equipment, windlasses, elevators, and laundry equipment. Operate and maintain (organizational and Intermediate level) marine boilers, pumps, forced draft blowers, and heat exchangers; perform tests, transfers, and inventory of lubricating oils, fuels, and water. Maintain records and reports, and may perform duties in the generation and stowage of industrial gases." Enlistees are taught the fundamentals of this rating through on-the-job training or formal Navy schooling. Advanced technical and operational training is available in this rating during later stages of career development.

Machinist's Mates (submarine) and Machinist's Mate (surface) generally fall into one of three roles:

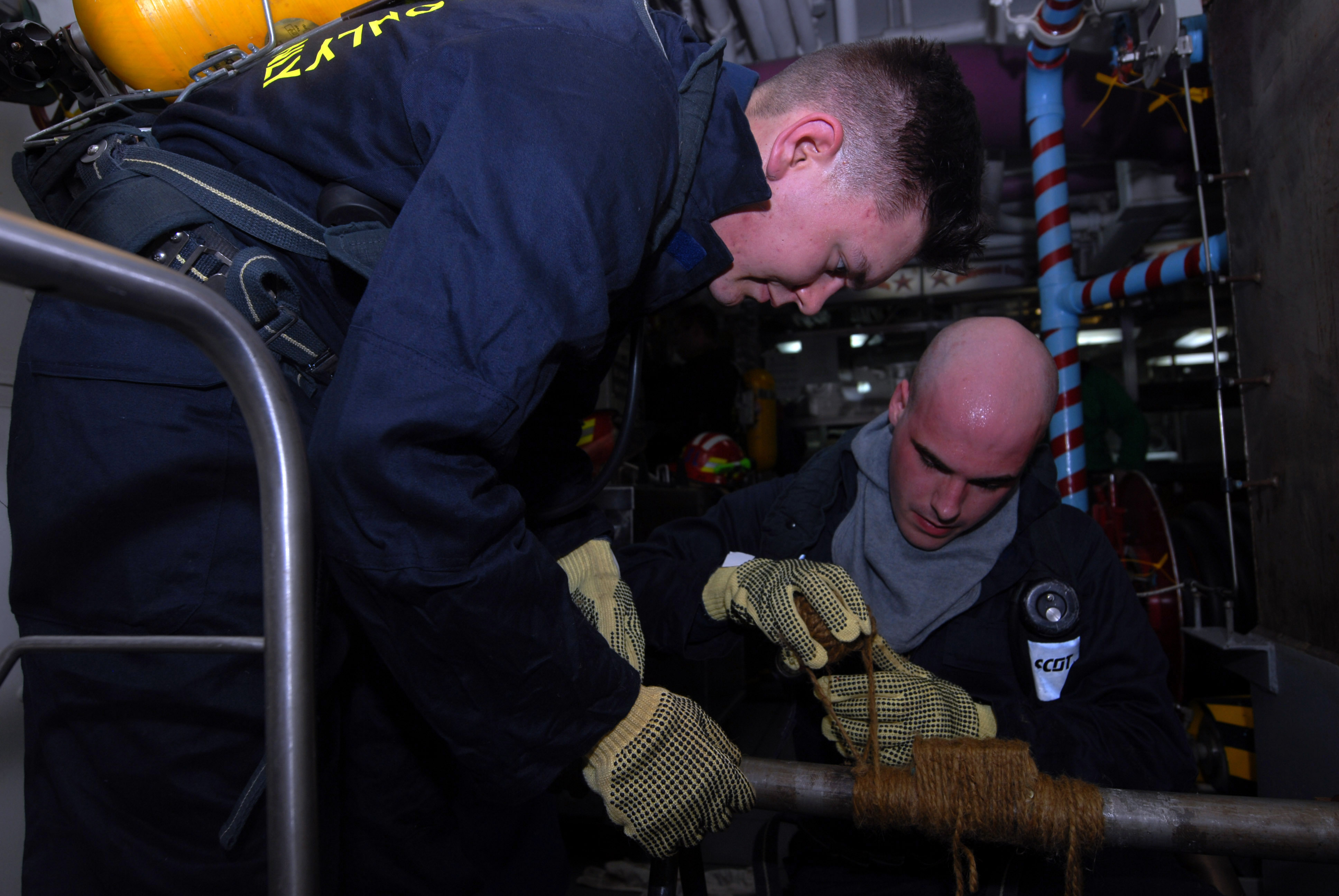
Machinist's Mates repairing a simulated cracked pipe with soft patch during a general quarters drill aboard USS Ronald Reagan

=== Propulsion mechanics ===
The core job of a Machinist's Mate is the engine room. A mechanic's job in the engine room is to operate the steam plant that provides propulsion, electric power (along with Electrician's Mates), potable water, and service steam to the ship. Machinist's Mates operate the boilers that generate the steam and use it to operate main engine (propulsion turbines), turbo generators, distilling units, and various auxiliary turbines. This job was previously performed by Boiler Technicians, however, the BT rating merged with Machinist's Mate in 1997. Machinist's Mates working in the propulsion plants are often referred to as "pit snipes", "hole snipes", or just "snipes" for short.

Machinist's Mates responsible for the propulsion plant are found in machinery division (or main engine division, main propulsion division, etc. in some ships), commonly referred to simply as M-Division or MP-Division. On surface nuclear ships, propulsion mechanics are found in Reactor Propulsion Division (commonly still referred to as M-Div), Reactor Mechanical (RM) Division, or Reactor Laboratories (RL) Division. USS Enterprise was the exception, in that M-Division was still part of Engineering Department, as opposed to Reactor Department. Navy Times of 7 January 2013 reports the Navy will be realigning Machinist's Mate, and Engineman ratings. EN whose primary skills are in maintaining auxiliary engineering will become MMs. EN aboard ship will now concentrate strictly on diesel propulsion which powers many amphibious ships, while all surface shipboard auxiliary machinery work will be under the MM rating. This will affect almost 2000 ENs.

=== Auxiliary mechanics ===
The other major place to find Machinist's Mates is in the auxiliaries division of engineering department, often referred to as "A-gang". Mechanics in this role establish training & work on mechanical equipment within and outside of the engine rooms. To include the operation and preventive maintenance of: air conditioning and refrigeration units, liquid oxygen and nitrogen units, hydraulic lifting and hoisting gear, hydraulic power plant components and mechanisms, chilled and fresh water, atmosphere control, ventilation, emergency diesel and corresponding sub-systems, ballast control, auxiliary drain, compressed air and gases, plumbing, trash disposal & other equipment as designated by the Engineering Officer (Chief Engineer, or CHENG). Members of "A-gang" may also help Damage Controlman, Gunner's Mates, or other ratings. Some listed attributes apply to Submarine Warfare to include SUBSAFE requirements for work authorization. All systems listed apply to a minimum of valve, pump maintenance repair. "A-gang" rates can be submarine qualified and will go through BESS (Basic Enlisted Submarine School) and then proceed forward to their A-school training specific to Machinist Mate rate where they will learn the above-mentioned skills. This schooling takes place in Groton, Connecticut.

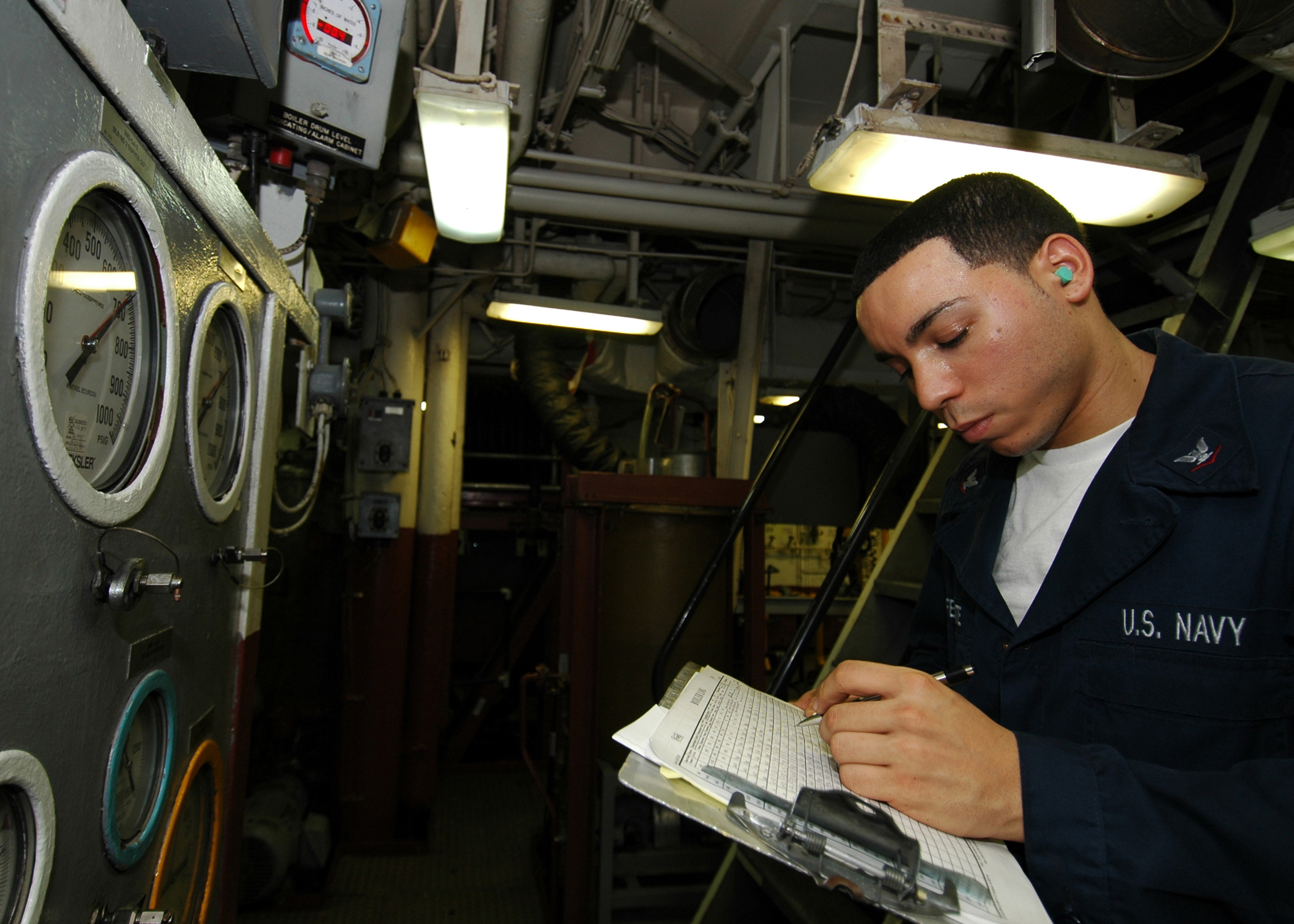
A Machinist's Mate takes readings in the engine room of the multi-purpose amphibious assault ship USS Iwo Jima.

=== Nuclear mechanics ===
Some MMs are qualified to work on nuclear propulsion plants. They are designated as Machinist's Mate nuclear (MMN). These mechanics go through a rigorous training program consisting of three months at the Nuclear Field "A" School or in previous years Machinist's Mate "A" School, six months of Naval Nuclear Power Training Command also known as Nuclear Power School, and six months at one of several Nuclear Power Training Units (NPTU). Two NPTUs are moored training ships (MTS) using S6G reactors located at the Naval Weapons Station in Charleston, South Carolina, and two additional NPTUs are land-based prototype units using a modified S5W reactor (MARF DMC) and an S8G reactor located in Ballston Spa, New York. NPTU Idaho (now decommissioned) at the Naval Reactors Facility operated the first prototype from 1953 to the mid-1990s which was for the USS Nautilus (SSN-571), named S1W, the prototype for the USS Enterprise (CVN-65), named A1W, and S5G, which are all shutdown and defueled. This course of instruction is commonly referred to as "the nuclear-power pipeline".

MMNs earn a N25O Navy Enlisted Classification (NEC) (surface) or N15O (submarines) upon completion of prototype. Along with the normal duties of a propulsion mechanic, they are responsible for the operation, maintenance, and repair of the auxiliary equipment in support of the Naval reactor(s) under their care. Later in his/her career before the 18th month after reporting to the CVN/SSN/SSBN/SSGN, the MMN must qualify his/her senior in-rate watch station. The following are for NIMITIZ CVN-68 Class (A4W) of Surface MMN's (Chief Reactor Watch for surface MMNs in Reactor Mechanical (RM) Division or Chief Machinery Operator for those in Machinery Division, and Engine Room Supervisor for submariners and FORD CVN-78 Class (A1B) Surface MMN's). The MMN must wait 5 years and be an E-5/E-6 to earn a N25S (surface both CVN Class) or N15S (submarines) Navy Enlisted Classification.

Additionally, some MMNs are designated as Engineering Laboratory Technicians (NEC N26O for surface, N16O for submariners) in Reactor Laboratories (RL) Division following successful completion of an additional 13 weeks of training. ELTs are water chemistry and radiological controls experts for their commands in addition to maintaining other MMN watchstation qualifications. After completion of required watch station qualification, submarine ELTs may complete an additional senior in-rate watch station in order to be assigned a supervisory NEC of N16S. For surface ELTs to achieve the supervisory NEC of N26S, they must complete a list of additional requirements. This designation is important as it garners additional pay and consideration during advancement.

Also, on submarines, some MMNs are designated as submarine nuclear propulsion plant emergency welders (NEC N51Z). They go through a two-month school learning welding, brazing, and soldering from Hull Maintenance Technician senior enlisted welders. Each submarine is required to have at least one of them to go underway. They are on board to provide emergency repairs to the plant if necessary to get the ship back to port where shipyard welders can complete a certified repair.

=== Various machinist's mate ratings ===
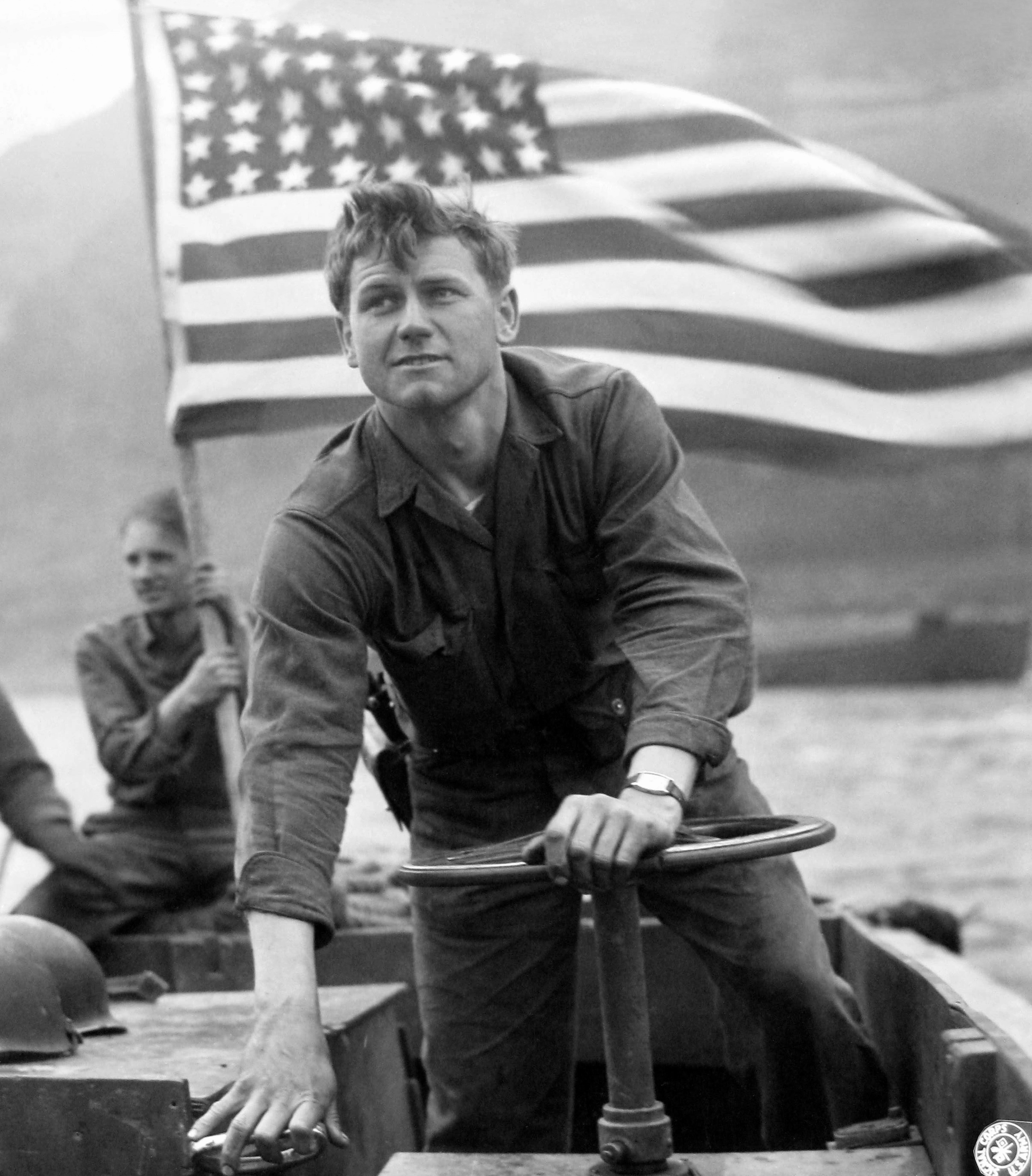
Motor Machinist's Mate Robert Mooty ferries troops across the Rhine at Oberwesel, Germany, March 1945.

The range of machinist's mate ratings include:

- MM - Machinist's Mate
- MM/SS - Machinist's Mate - Submarine Qualified
- MM/SW - Machinist's Mate - Surface Qualified
- MM(A) - Machinist's Mate (auxiliary)
- MM(A)(GE) - Machinist's Mate (A) (bombing)
- MM(A)(H) - Machinist's Mate (A) (hydrogen)
- MM(A)(P) - Machinist's Mate (A) (Photographic)
- MM(CBE) - Machinist's Mate (construction battalion) (equipment operator)
- MM(MB) - Machinist's Mate (motor boat)
- MM(N) - Machinist's Mate (nuclear)
- MM(O) - Machinist's Mate (optician)
- MM(SRE) - Machinist's Mate (ship repair) (engine operator)
- MM(SRI) - Machinist's Mate (ship repair) (instrument maker)
- MM(SRO) - Machinist's Mate (ship repair) (outside machinist)
- MM(SRS) - Machinist's Mate (ship repair) (inside machinist)
- MME - Machinist's Mate (engineman)
- MMG - Machinist's Mate (industrial gas generating)
- MML - Machinist's Mate (general)
- MMR - Machinist's Mate (refrigeration mechanic)
- MMS - Machinist's Mate (shop mechanic)
- MMARS - Machinist's Mate (arm regulation squad)
