= S1G reactor =

American naval reactor

The S1G reactor is a naval reactor used by the United States Navy to provide electricity generation and propulsion on warships. The S1G designation stands for:

- S = Submarine platform
- 1 = First generation core designed by the contractor
- G = General Electric was the contracted designer

== History ==
This nuclear reactor was constructed by General Electric as a prototype for the USS Seawolf (SSN-575) submarine. It was a liquid metal cooled reactor using pure sodium to cool the core instead of water, because the higher temperature of liquid sodium (compared to pressurized water) enabled the production of more superheated steam in the steam generators. This resulted in a more efficient thermal cycle, yielding more shaft horsepower for a given reactor size. The reactor design had problems because of limited operating temperature constraints. The major disadvantage of this concept was the ignition of sodium when exposed to air. The reactor core was beryllium-moderated.

S1G was used for testing and training. Eventually a sodium leak resulted in a fire, and the facility was shut down. In the meantime, the S1W and S2W pressurized water reactors, conceived for the USS Nautilus (SSN-571), had demonstrated their superior reliability. The S1G reactor facility and its Horton sphere were later reused for the D1G prototype destroyer reactor.
