= S2G reactor =

Naval reactor used by the United States Navy

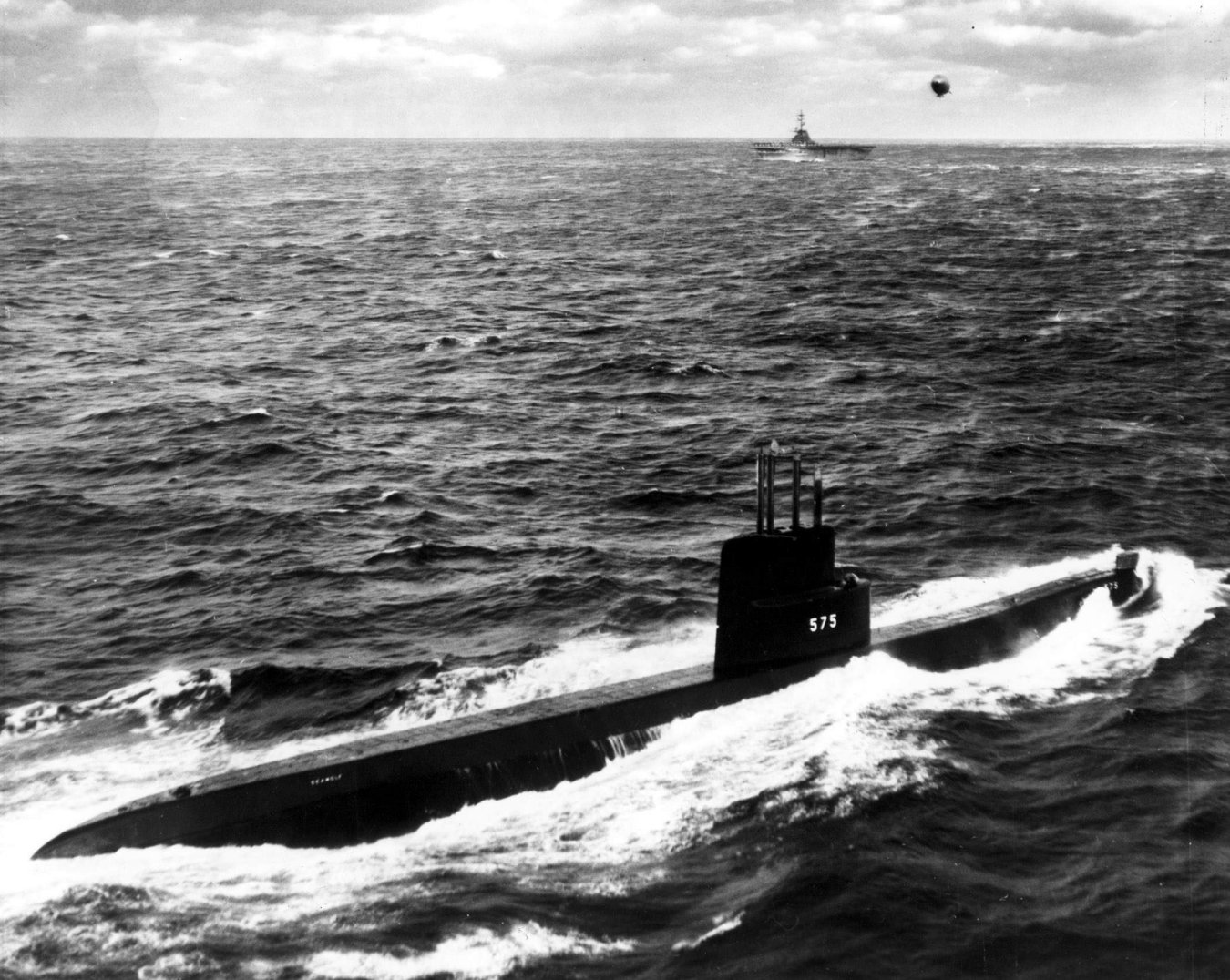
USS Seawolf (SSN-575)

The S2G reactor was a naval reactor used by the United States Navy to provide electricity generation and propulsion on warships, and the only liquid metal cooled reactor yet deployed by the US Navy. The S2G designation stands for:

- S = Submarine platform
- 2 = Second generation core designed by the contractor
- G = General Electric was the contracted designer

== History ==
An S2G was the initial power plant of USS Seawolf (SSN-575). This was one of three sodium cooled reactors (the core was moderated) ordered for the Seawolf program at the same time as three PWR units were ordered to support the USS Nautilus (SSN-571) program; In each case, one reactor was land-based for training and research, one intended for installation on a submarine, and one spare. The land-based unit corresponding to S2G was S1G reactor. The reactor core was beryllium-moderated.

Persistent superheater problems on Seawolf caused the superheaters to be bypassed, resulting in mediocre performance. This and concern for the dangers posed by liquid sodium coolant led to the PWR type being selected instead as the standard US naval reactor type, and the S2G on Seawolf was replaced by the spare S2Wa reactor from the Nautilus program.

The Atomic Energy Commission historians' account of the naval sodium-cooled reactor experience was:

Although makeshift repairs permitted the Seawolf to complete her initial sea trials on reduced power in February 1957, Rickover had already decided to abandon the sodium-cooled reactor. Early in November 1956, he informed the Commission that he would take steps toward replacing the reactor in the Seawolf with a water-cooled plant similar to that in the Nautilus. The leaks in the Seawolf steam plant were an important factor in the decision but even more persuasive were the inherent limitations in sodium-cooled systems. In Rickover's words they were "expensive to build, complex to operate, susceptible to prolonged shutdown as a result of even minor malfunctions, and difficult and time-consuming to repair."
