= United States naval reactors =

Classes of nuclear reactors used by the United States Navy

Coordinates: 46°33′54.8″N 119°31′09.7″W

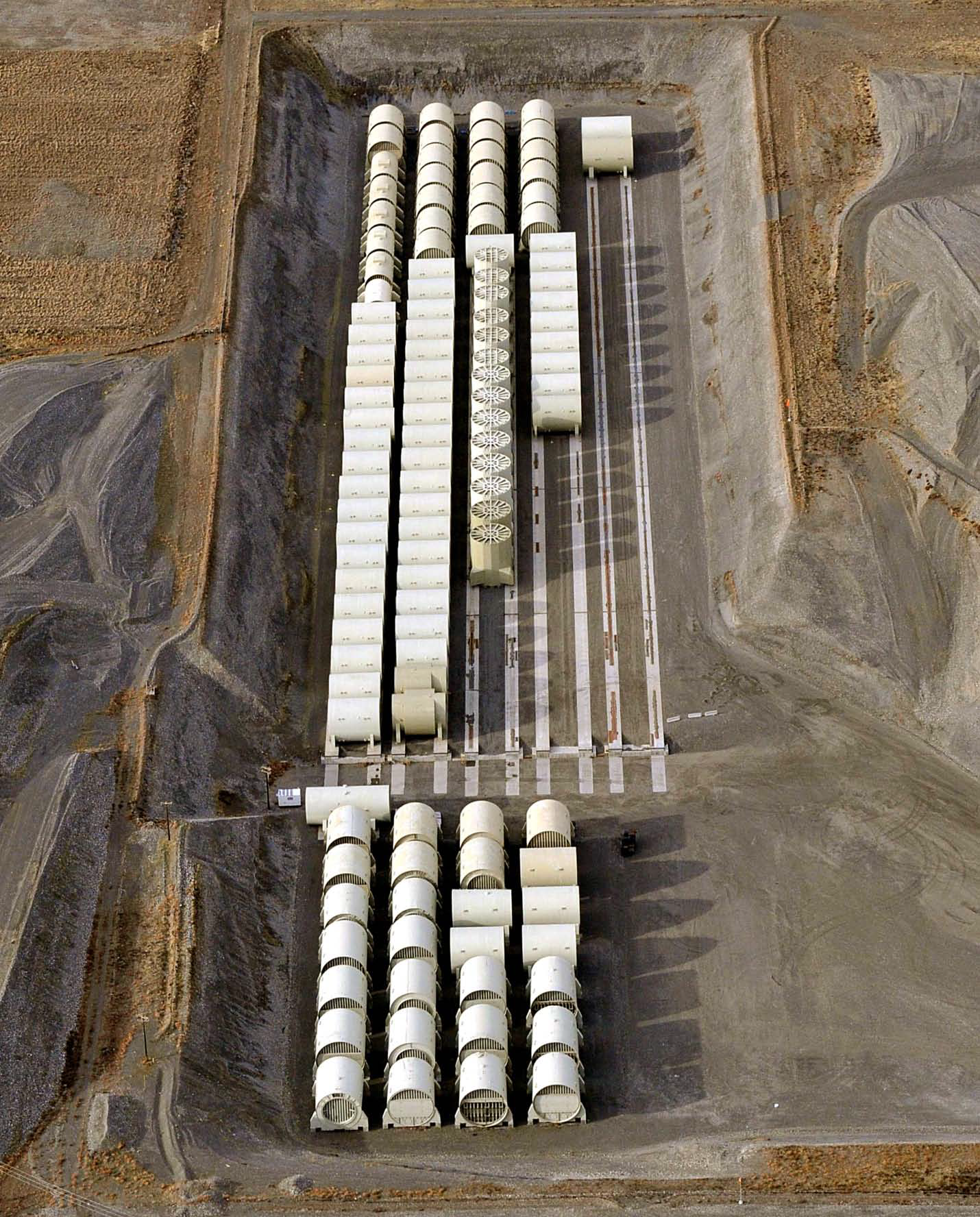
The Naval Reactor Disposal Site, Trench 94 200 Area East Hanford Site in Benton County in the U.S. state of Washington, in November 2009. Stored Reactor Compartment Packages of pre-Los Angeles class, Los Angeles class, and cruisers.

United States naval reactors are nuclear reactors used by the United States Navy aboard certain ships to generate the steam used to produce power for propulsion, electric power, catapulting airplanes in aircraft carriers, and a few minor uses. Such naval nuclear reactors have a complete power plant associated with them. All commissioned U.S. Navy submarines and supercarriers built since 1975 are nuclear powered, with the last conventional carrier, USS Kitty Hawk, being decommissioned in May 2009. The U.S. Navy also had nine nuclear-powered cruisers with such reactors, but they have since been decommissioned also.

Reactors are designed by a number of contractors, then developed and tested at one of several Department of Energy-owned and prime contractor-operated facilities: Bettis Atomic Power Laboratory in West Mifflin, Pennsylvania and its associated Naval Reactors Facility in Idaho, and Knolls Atomic Power Laboratory in Niskayuna, New York and its associated Kesselring site in West Milton, New York, all under the management of the office of Naval Reactors. Sometimes there were full-scale nuclear-powered prototype plants built at the Naval Reactors Facility, Kesselring, and Windsor (in Connecticut) to test the nuclear plants, which were operated for years to train nuclear-qualified sailors.

== Reactor designations ==
Each reactor design is given a three-character designation consisting of:

- A letter for the type of ship the reactor is intended for ("A" for aircraft carrier, "C" for cruiser, "D" for destroyer, and "S" for submarine)
- A consecutive generation number
- A letter for the reactor's designer ("W" for Westinghouse, "G" for General Electric, "C" for Combustion Engineering, and "B" for Bechtel)

For example, a S9G reactor represents a submarine (S), ninth-generation (9), General Electric designed reactor (G).

== History ==
Conceptual analysis of nuclear marine propulsion started in the 1940s. Research on developing nuclear reactors for the Navy was done at Bettis Atomic Power Laboratory in West Mifflin, Pennsylvania starting in 1948. Under the long-term leadership of Admiral Hyman G. Rickover, the first test reactor plant, a prototype referred to as S1W, started up in U.S. in 1953 at the Naval Reactors Facility in Idaho. Bettis Laboratory and Naval Reactors Facility were operated initially and for many decades afterwards by Westinghouse. The first nuclear-powered vessel, the submarine USS Nautilus, put to sea in 1955. USS Nautilus marked the beginning of the transition of submarines from relatively slow and short-ranged conventional submarines to ones capable of sustaining 20–25 knots (37–46 km/h; 23–29 mph) submerged for weeks on end.

Much of the early development work on naval reactors was done at the Naval Reactors Facility on the campus of the Idaho National Laboratory (INL, previously INEL). USS Nautilus was powered by the S2W reactor, and crew were trained on the land-based S1W reactor at INL.

The second nuclear submarine was USS Seawolf, which was initially powered by a sodium-cooled S2G reactor, and supported by the land-based S1G reactor at the Kesselring site under Knolls Atomic Power Laboratory operated by General Electric. A spare S2G was also built but never used.

USS Seawolf was plagued by superheater problems, with the result that USS Nautilus delivered far superior performance. This and the risks posed by liquid sodium in the event of an accident at sea led Admiral Rickover to select the pressurized water reactor (PWR) as the standard U.S. naval reactor type. The S2G was removed from USS Seawolf and replaced by the S2Wa reactor, using components from the spare S2W that was part of the USS Nautilus program. All subsequent U.S. naval reactors have been PWRs, while the Soviet Navy used mainly PWRs, but also used lead-bismuth cooled liquid metal cooled reactors (LMFR) of three types in eight submarines: K-27 and the seven-member Alfa class.

Experience with USS Nautilus led to the parallel development of further (Skate-class) submarines, powered by single reactors, and an aircraft carrier, USS Enterprise, powered by eight A2W reactor units in 1960. A cruiser, USS Long Beach, followed in 1961 and was powered by two C1W reactor units. USS Enterprise remained in service for over 50 years, and was inactivated in 2012.

Full-scale land-based prototype plants in Idaho, New York, and Connecticut preceded development of several types (generations) of U.S. naval nuclear reactors, although not all of them. After initial construction, some engineering testing was done and the prototypes were used to train nuclear-qualified sailors for many years afterwards. For example, the A1W prototype at Naval Reactors Facility led to development of A2W reactors used in USS Enterprise. By 1962, the US Navy had 26 nuclear submarines operational and 30 under construction. Nuclear power had revolutionized the U.S. Navy.

The technology was shared with the United Kingdom, while technological development in France, China and the Soviet Union proceeded separately.

After the Skate-class vessels, reactor development proceeded and in the U.S. a single series of standardized designs was built by both Westinghouse and General Electric, with one reactor powering each vessel. Rolls-Royce built similar units as the PWR1 for Royal Navy submarines and then developed the design further to the PWR2. Numerous submarines with an S5W reactor plant were built.

At the end of the Cold War in 1989, there were over 400 nuclear-powered submarines operational or being built. Some 250 of these submarines have now been scrapped and some on order canceled, due to weapons reduction programs. The Russian Navy and United States Navy had over one hundred each, with the United Kingdom and France less than twenty each and China six. The total today is about 160.

The United States is the main navy with nuclear-powered aircraft carriers (10), while Russia has nuclear-powered cruisers. Russia has eight nuclear icebreakers in service or building. Since its inception in 1948, the U.S. Navy nuclear program has developed 27 different plant designs, installed them in 210 nuclear-powered ships, taken 500 reactor cores into operation, and accumulated over 5,400 reactor years of operation and 128,000,000 miles safely steamed. Additionally, 98 nuclear submarines and six nuclear cruisers have been recycled. The U.S. Navy has never disclosed a reactor accident, but has suffered at least one coolant loss accident, on the USS Guardfish.

All nine of the U.S. Navy nuclear-powered cruisers (CGN) have now been stricken from the Naval Vessel Register, and those not already scrapped by recycling are scheduled to be recycled. While reactor accidents have not sunk any U.S. Navy ships or submarines, two nuclear-powered submarines, USS Thresher and USS Scorpion were lost at sea. The condition of these reactors has not been publicly released, although both wrecks have been investigated by Robert Ballard on behalf of the Navy using remotely operated vehicles (ROVs).

Congress has mandated that the U.S. Navy consider nuclear power as an option on all large surface combatants (cruisers, destroyers) and amphibious assault ships. If proven cost-effective in a life cycle cost analysis during the Analysis of Alternatives (AoA) phase of preliminary ship design, new ship classes (e.g. CG(X)) could proceed with nuclear propulsion.

== Power plants ==
Current U.S. naval reactors are all pressurized water reactors, which are identical to PWR commercial reactors producing electricity, except that:

- They have a high power density in a small volume and run either on low-enriched uranium (as do some French and Chinese submarines) or on highly enriched uranium (>20% U-235, current U.S. submarines use fuel enriched to at least 93%)
- They have long core lives, so that refueling is needed only after 10 or more years, and new cores are designed to last 25 years in carriers and 10–33 years in submarines,
- The design enables a compact pressure vessel while maintaining safety.

Long core life is enabled by high uranium enrichment and by incorporating a "burnable neutron poison", which is progressively depleted as non-burnable poisons like fission products and actinides accumulate. The loss of burnable poison counterbalances the creation of non-burnable poisons and result in stable long term fuel efficiency.

Long-term integrity of the compact reactor pressure vessel is maintained by providing an internal neutron shield. (This is in contrast to early Soviet civil PWR designs where embrittlement occurs due to neutron bombardment of a very narrow pressure vessel.)

Reactor sizes range up to ~500 MWt (about 165 MWe) in the larger submarines and surface ships. The French Rubis-class submarines have a 48 MW reactor that needs no refueling for 30 years.

The nuclear navies of the United States, the United Kingdom, and the Russian Federation rely on steam turbine propulsion. Those of the French and Chinese use the turbine to generate electricity for propulsion. Most Russian submarines as well as all U.S. surface ships since Enterprise are powered by two or more reactors. U.S., British, French, Chinese and Indian submarines are powered by one.

Decommissioning nuclear-powered submarines has become a major task for American and Russian navies. After defuelling, U.S. practice is to cut the reactor section from the vessel for disposal in shallow land burial as low-level waste (see the Ship-Submarine Recycling Program).

== See also ==
- List of United States naval reactors
- Radioisotope thermoelectric generator
- Nuclear-powered cruisers of the United States Navy
- Nuclear-powered submarines of the United States Navy
- Nuclear Power School
