= S1W =

S1W may refer to:

- S1W (group), music group formerly known as Security of the First World that later became part of the hip hop music group Public Enemy
- S1W reactor, a type of naval reactor used by the United States Navy
