= How the Battleship Maine Was Destroyed =

1976 book by Hyman Rickover

- 1995 edition
- Author: Hyman G. Rickover
- Language: English
- Subject: The 1898 destruction of the USS Maine
- Publisher: Naval History Division (1st ed.), Naval Institute Press (2nd ed.)
- Publication date: 1976
- Publication place: United States
- Media type: Print

How the Battleship Maine Was Destroyed is the name of a 1976 monograph written by Hyman G. Rickover, an admiral in the United States Navy. In the work, Rickover discusses the 1898 destruction of the USS Maine—a calamitous event which precipitated the United States' involvement in the Spanish–American War (1898). How the Battleship Maine Was Destroyed was initially published by the Naval History Division, and in 1995, it was reissued with a new foreword and additional supplemental material by the Naval Institute Press.

In this work, Rickover argues that both the initial inquiry into the ship's sinking and the 1911 investigation were erroneous in attributing the ship's destruction to a mine. This work also contains an appendix written by Ib S. Hansen and Robert S. Price (the former a structural engineer from the David W. Taylor Naval Ship Research and Development Center, and the latter a physicist from the Naval Surface Weapons Center), whose expert findings were used by Rickover to support his conclusions; while an appendix, many writers and reviewers have nevertheless called Hansen and Price's section the "heart of the book".

== Overview ==
The bulk of the work—which was written by Rickover with editorial and research assistance from Francis Duncan and Dana M. Wegner—recounts the story of the Maine's 1898 destruction in Havana Harbor. Rickover provides historical and political context for the event before discussing the Naval Board of Inquiry's initial inquiry into the ship's destruction and the 1911 reconsideration of the topic. In his conclusion, Rickover argued that the Maine was likely destroyed by an accidental coal fire, and he critiqued Charles Dwight Sigsbee (who was serving as the captain of the Maine when it was destroyed) for not properly safeguarding his ship from the dangers posed by coal fires. Rickover also critiqued the Navy for their investigations: He lambasted William T. Sampson's 1898 inquiry for failing to talk to technical experts and he critiqued Charles E. Vreeland's 1911 inquiry for likely being "willing on technical grounds to overturn the fundamental conclusion of the 1898 court", but unwilling to push back on the idea that there had been a mine, given the lack of compelling evidence.

The work also contains three supplementary appendices providing addition evidence and context for Rickover's conclusions: The first appendix is a technical report entitled "The U.S.S. Maine: An Examination of the Technical Evidence Bearing on its Destruction" that was written by Hansen and Price. This report considers the technical details of the event, with the contributors concluding that there is no compelling evidence "that [suggests] an external explosion initiated the destruction of the Maine". The second appendix explores aspects of international law that were raised by the sinking of the Maine. The third appendix is an analysis of the destruction of the French battleship Iéna, which was destroyed in 1907 by the spontaneous combustion of its magazine while dry-docking in Toulon.

== Background ==
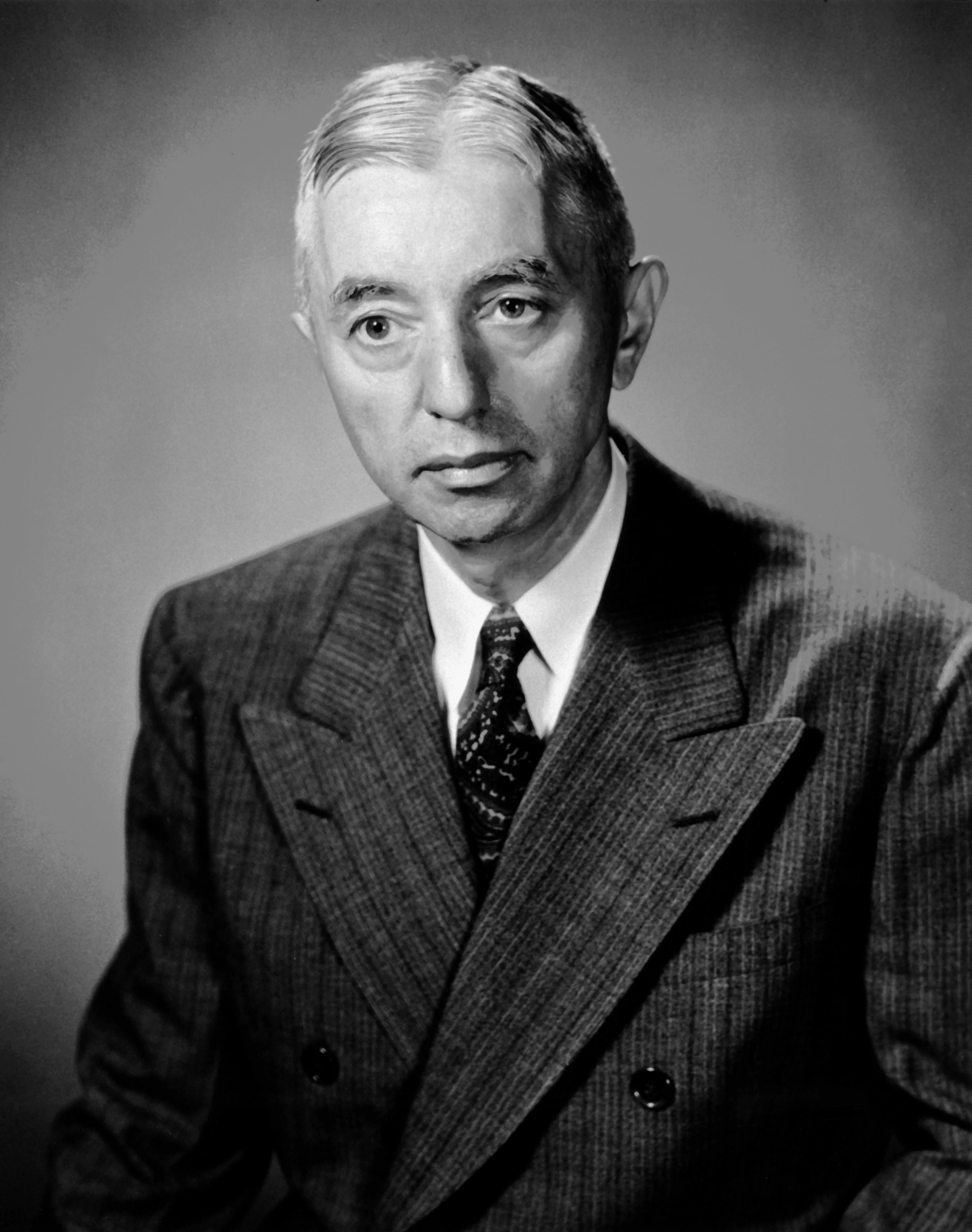
How the Battleship Maine Was Destroyed was authored by Hyman G. Rickover, an admiral in the United States Navy.

Hyman G. Rickover was inspired to write the book when, in September 1974, he read an article in the Washington Star-News about the destruction of the Maine. Rickover was struck by the paper's assertion that "no one had yet determined whether the Maine had been destroyed by a mine or an accidental explosion". Rickover believed that modern naval engineering innovations could shed light on this mystery, but due to his obligations as an admiral, he did not have the time to browse the government records, newspaper articles, and reports that discussed the Navy's 1898 and 1911 investigations. He therefore approached two of his staff members, Dana Wegner and Francis Duncan, and tasked them with assembling the records needed to reassess the incident.

Among the documents that Wegner and Duncan perused were William Ferguson's surveys of the wreck, which he carried out from 1910 to 1911. Ferguson had meticulously photographed the wreck when it was being raised, taking care to identify key elements of the ship, such as frame numbers. Wegner and Duncan believed that the technical and thorough nature of Ferguson's reports could help modern engineers deduce what sunk the Maine; when they showed the reports to Rickover, the admiral agreed and began planning a scholarly monograph to summarize any findings. The resulting work, How the Battleship Maine Was Destroyed, was published by the Naval History Division in 1976. In 1995, it was reissued with a new foreword and additional supplemental material by the Naval Institute Press.

== Reception ==
Richard P. Smyers, in a 1976 review for Warship International, called the monograph a "completely researched and scholarly ... account" of the Maine's destruction; he further complimented it for being "interesting and readable". In a 1977 review for the Pacific Historical Review, Lewis L. Gould wrote, "This small monograph is a model investigation of a controversial event, and will instruct scholars on the range of source material available on the key issues that brought the nation to world power."

Writing in 1977 for the Naval War College Review, the historian Graham A. Cosmas contended that Rickover et al. "[come] about as close to settling the question as is possible this far away in time from the actual event". While noting that the book was unlikely to "radically alter" an understanding of the Spanish–American War, Cosmas stated that "Rickover's analysis simply furnishes expert confirmation" that the Maine was destroyed by accident. Cosmas concluded his review by writing that the book was "useful but limited", due to its focus largely on "what went wrong with the machines". He thus calls for another study to be done that explores the "human elements" that led to the disaster.

In a 1978 review for Technology and Culture, the former U.S. Naval Academy midshipman Alex Roland declared that "Admiral Rickover has presented an informed and convincing case for what [many] have believed all along: There is no evidence that a mine destroyed the Maine." Roland wrote highly of Hansen and Price's contribution to the monograph, arguing that it "dominates the argument". While Roland did critique the work's length and contend that its arguments sounded "too much like [Rickover's] testimony before Congress during the last quarter century to be mistaken for impartial historical judgment", the reviewer nevertheless complimented the author for writing a study that, at least in part, argued that the U.S. Navy was responsible for the loss of the Maine.
