= A1W reactor =

American naval nuclear reactor

The A1W reactor is a prototype nuclear reactor used by the United States Navy to provide electricity generation and propulsion on warships. The A1W designation stands for:

- A = Aircraft carrier platform
- 1 = First generation core designed by the contractor
- W = Westinghouse was the contracted designer

== History ==
The reactor was a Westinghouse Electric Corporation-built naval reactor power plant, installed in the Naval Reactors Facility in the desert at the Idaho National Engineering Laboratory near Arco, Idaho. It first operated in October 1958. This reactor plant consisted of two reactors, A1W-A and A1W-B, operated in tandem so that the steam produced by both reactors was used to power one turbine connected to a drive shaft.

Since the purpose of A1W prototype was to simulate the USS Enterprise at sea it was also possible to divert the steam to two 'dump condensers' that simulated launching aircraft. Also, the electricity generated by the Main Engine was dissipated by immersing three electrodes in a pool of water. This was done to simulate load. In the early 1970s the A1W-B core was replaced with 1/4 of the USS Nimitz core for testing.

This nuclear reactor was the prototype for the A2W reactor used in the world's first nuclear-powered aircraft carrier, the USS Enterprise (CVN-65).

The A1W prototype was used to train nuclear-qualified sailors for almost 34 years until its reactor plants were shut down on January 26, 1994.

== See also ==
- List of United States naval reactors
