= S5G reactor =

Prototype naval reactor

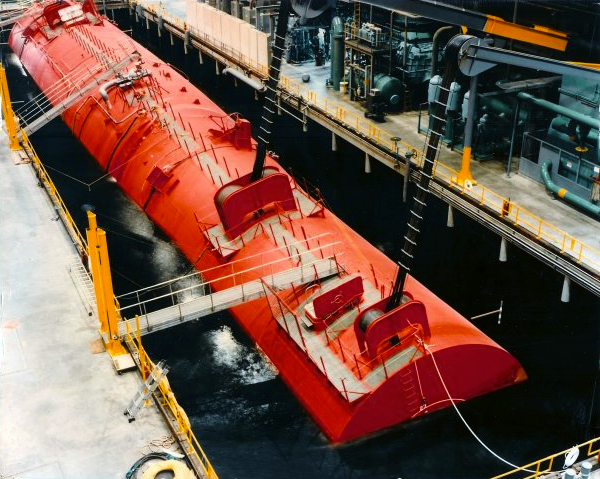
The S5G reactor plant floats in a tank of water to simulate the engine room of a submarine

The S5G reactor was a prototype naval reactor designed for the United States Navy to provide electricity generation and propulsion on submarines. The S5G designation stands for:

- S = Submarine platform
- 5 = Fifth generation core designed by the contractor
- G = General Electric was the contracted designer

== Design ==
The S5G was a pressurized water reactor plant with two coolant loops and two steam generators. It had to be designed with the reactor vessel low in the boat and the steam generators high to develop and maintain natural circulation of the primary coolant.

Reactor primary coolant pumps are a major source of noise from submarines, and eliminating the pumps and associated equipment would also reduce mechanical complexity and the space required for propulsion equipment.

The S5G had primary coolant pumps, but they were needed only at very high speeds. Because the reactor core was designed with very smooth coolant paths, the coolant pumps were smaller and quieter than those used by the competing S5W core. They were also fewer in number. In most cases, the submarine could be operated without using coolant pumps at all. The quiet design resulted in a larger hull diameter but required larger primary coolant piping than the competing S5W reactor. Due to the larger size, the S5G was not used in subsequent attack submarines, but was a precursor to the S8G reactor design used in the larger Ohio-class submarines.

To further reduce engine plant noise, the normal propulsion setup of two steam turbines driving the screw through a reduction gear unit was changed instead to one large propulsion turbine with no reduction gears. This eliminated noise from the main reduction gears, but it required a huge main propulsion turbine. The turbine was cylindrical, about 12 feet in diameter, and about 30 feet long. This massive size was necessary to turn slowly enough to directly drive the screw and remain fairly efficient. The same propulsion setup was used on both USS Narwhal and the land-based prototype.

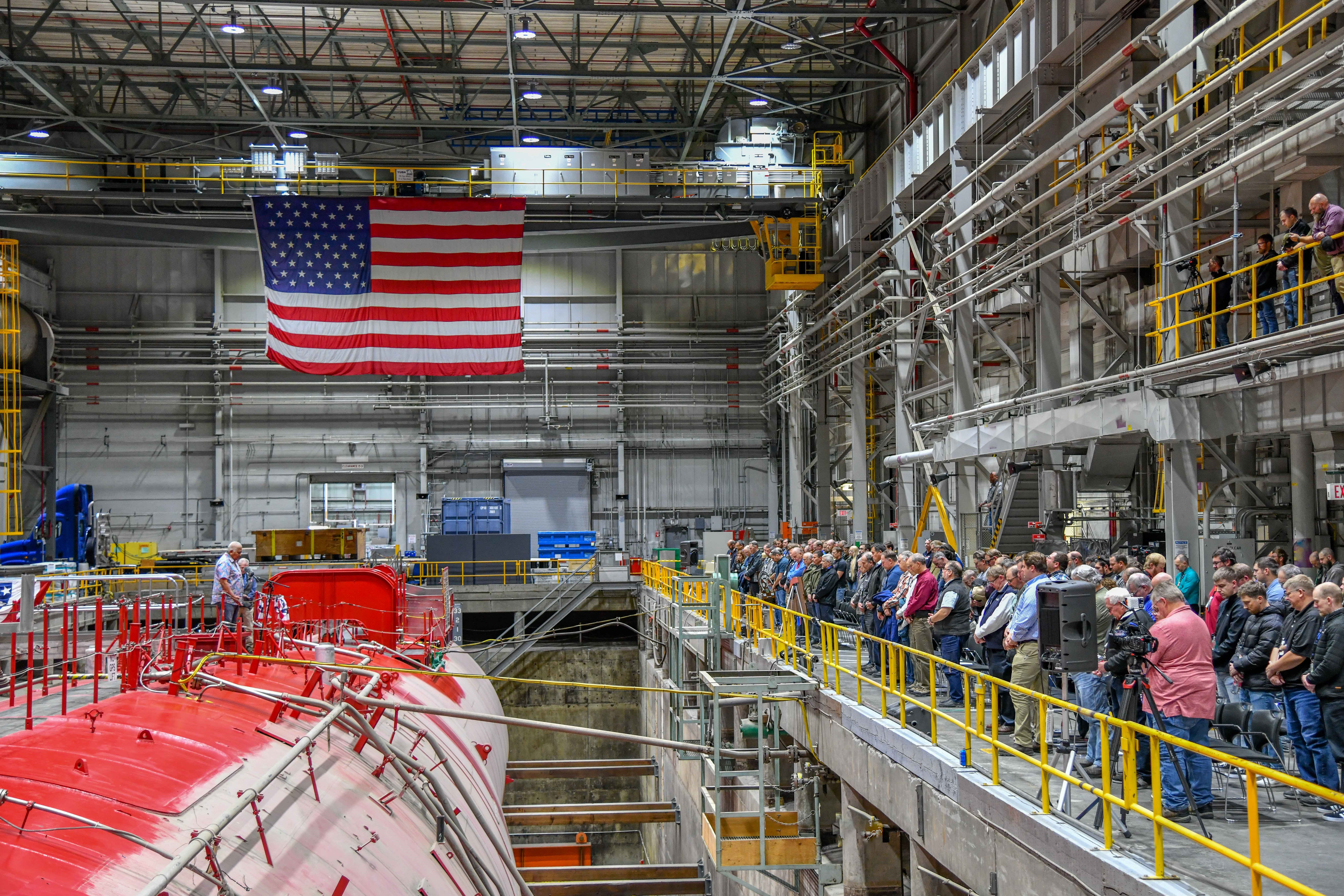
The S5G Prototype was turned over to the U.S. Department of Energy's Office of Environmental Management in 2024 for demolition. Several programs for documenting the facilities were also planned with organizations involved in historical preservation.

The concept of a natural circulation plant was relatively new when the Navy requested this design. The prototype plant in Idaho therefore underwent rigorous performance shakedown to determine whether such a design would work for the US Navy. It was largely a success, although the design never became the basis for any more fast-attack submarines besides the Narwhal. Prototype testing included simulating essentially the entire engine room of an attack submarine. Floating the plant in a large pool of water allowed the prototype to be rotated along its long axis to simulate a hard turn, accomplished by torquing large gyroscopes mounted forward of the reactor compartment. This was necessary to determine whether natural circulation would continue during hard turns, since natural circulation depends on gravity while submarines maneuver at various angles.

The S5G was superseded by the S8G reactor used in Ohio Class submarines.

== History ==
This nuclear reactor was installed both at a land-based prototype—initially used for testing the concept and, later, for training thousands of Navy operators—at the Naval Reactor Facility, Idaho National Laboratory near Arco, Idaho, and in the USS Narwhal (SSN-671); both have been decommissioned. The test was intended to assess the potential contribution of natural circulation technology to submarine quieting.

Built in the early 1960s, the S5G prototype was permanently shut down in May 1995. After defueling, the Navy turned it over for demolition in 2024.
