= A2W reactor =

Naval nuclear reactor

The A2W reactor is a naval nuclear reactor used by the United States Navy to provide electricity generation and propulsion on warships. The A2W designation stands for:

- A = Aircraft carrier platform
- 2 = Second generation core designed by the contractor
- W = Westinghouse was the contracted designer

== History ==
This nuclear reactor was used in the world's first nuclear-powered aircraft carrier, the USS Enterprise (CVN-65). The four propulsion plants on Enterprise each contained two reactors, numbered according to the shaft they powered, 1A-1B, 2A-2B, 3A-3B, and 4A-4B. Each propulsion plant was capable of operating on one reactor plant through most of the power range required to propel the ship at speeds in excess of 33 knots (60 km/h). Both reactors would have been on-line to simultaneously provide maximum ship speed and plane launching capability.

== Design and operation ==
The reactors are pressurized water reactors fueled by highly enriched uranium-235. Light water is used as both neutron-moderator and reactor coolant. Hafnium control rods are used to control the operation of the reactor. Extracting the rods to a calculated height allows the reactor to reach criticality, the point at which the nuclear fission reactions reach a self-sustaining level. Thereafter, steam flow (from the steam generators) regulates reactor power as explained below. The control rods are "shimmed" in or out to regulate average coolant temperature or lowered to the bottom of the reactor vessel to shut the reactor down — either done in a slow controlled manner or dropped rapidly during what is called a SCRAM to immediately shut the reactor down in an emergency.

Much of the reactor power control during steady-state operation comes as a result of the coolant water's negative temperature coefficient. The power of the reactor is determined by the instantaneous rate of fission events that take place in the fuel. As the water heats up, it expands and becomes less dense, which provides fewer molecules per volume to moderate the neutrons, hence fewer neutrons are slowed to the required thermal energies to sustain thermal fission. Conversely, when the coolant water temperature decreases, its density increases and a greater number of neutrons reach the required thermal energy, increasing the number of fissions per unit of time, creating more heat. This has the effect of allowing "steam demand" to control reactor power, requiring little intervention by the Reactor Operator for changes in the power demanded by the ship's operations.

The hot water from the reactors is sent, via large pipes, into heat exchangers called steam generators. There the heat from the pressurized, superheated reactor coolant water is transferred, through tube walls, to water being fed into the steam generators from a separate feed system. Once the reactor coolant water has given off its heat in the steam generators, it is returned, via large electric pumps (four per reactor), to the reactors to repeat the cycle.

Saturated steam is channeled from each steam generator to a common header, where the steam is then sent to the main engine, electrical generators, aircraft catapult system, and various auxiliaries. There are two main propulsion turbines, one high pressure turbine and one low pressure turbine, with a moisture separator in place between the two. The Low Pressure main propulsion turbine is double-ended, whereby the steam enters at the center and divides into two streams as it enters the actual turbine wheels, expanding and giving up its energy as it does so, causing the turbine to spin at high speed. The main shaft enters a reduction gear in which the high rotational velocity of the turbine shaft is stepped down to a usable turn rate for propelling the ship. The expended steam from the main engine and other auxiliaries enters condensers to be cooled into liquid water and recycled to the feed system.

== See also ==
- List of United States naval reactors
