= S2W reactor =

US naval nuclear reactor

The S2W (Submarine platform Second generation core Westinghouse) reactor was a naval reactor built by Westinghouse used by the United States Navy to provide electricity generation and propulsion on warships.

== History ==
The S2W reactor was a naval nuclear reactor developed by Westinghouse Electric Corporation for use in the United States Navy's nuclear-powered submarines. The reactor's designation, S2W, stands for "Submarine platform," "second-generation core design," and "Westinghouse," the contractor responsible for its development. It was a pressurized water reactor (PWR) initially installed aboard the USS Seawolf (SSN-575), the second nuclear-powered submarine launched by the U.S. Navy in 1955. The S2W reactor was originally designed as a sodium-cooled system, but operational difficulties with this cooling method led to its later conversion to a conventional pressurized water reactor. This design provided substantial improvements in submerged endurance and speed over conventional diesel-electric submarines, marking a pivotal advancement in naval propulsion. The S2W reactor, though eventually phased out, was significant in the early stages of nuclear submarine technology and helped shape the U.S. Navy's future reactor designs, which ultimately favored the reliability and operational ease of pressurized water reactors.

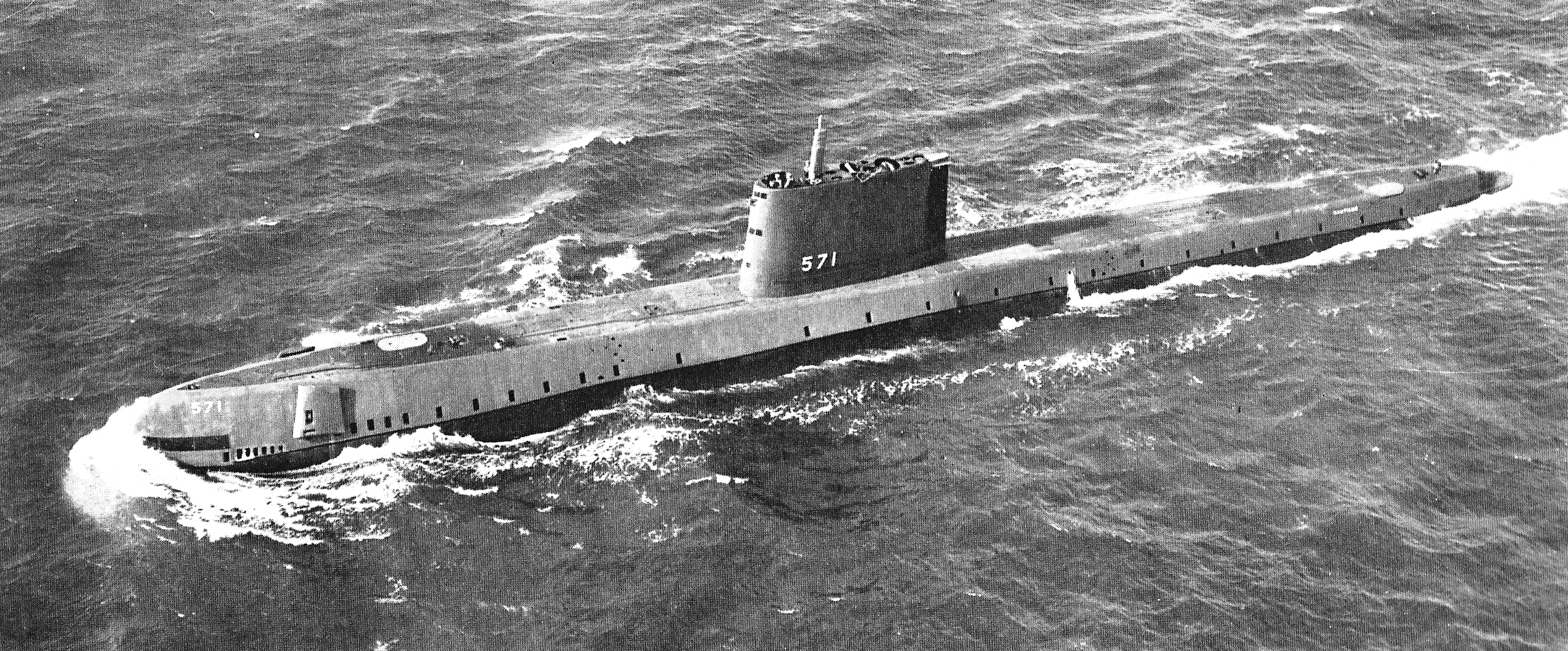
USS Nautilus during her initial sea trials, 20 January 1955

This nuclear reactor is the shipboard equivalent of the prototype S1W reactor, with minor design changes, that was installed on USS Nautilus. As installed in Nautilus it generated 13,400 horsepower (10.0 MW). It was originally designated STR.

=== USS Nautilus (SSN-571) ===
USS Nautilus (SSN-571) was powered by the Submarine Thermal Reactor (STR), later redesignated the S2W reactor, a pressurized water reactor produced for the US Navy by Westinghouse Electric Corporation. Bettis Atomic Power Laboratory, operated by Westinghouse, developed the basic reactor plant design used in Nautilus after being given the assignment on 31 December 1947 to design a nuclear power plant for a submarine.

After Nautilus was decommissioned, the reactor equipment was removed. The submarine is now moored and displayed as a museum ship at the Naval Submarine Base New London in Groton, Connecticut.

== Variant ==
After the predictable problems arose with the S2G's use of 347 stainless steel caused by the sodium in the liquid sodium reactor in its superheater the USS Seawolf (SSN-575) had her S2G liquid metal cooled reactor replaced using the spare S2W built for USS Nautilus. During the conversion, the steam turbines in the powerplant were also re-bladed to use saturated, rather than superheated, steam. This reactor was designated S2Wa.
