= USS Seawolf (SSN-575) =

US Navy nuclear attack submarine

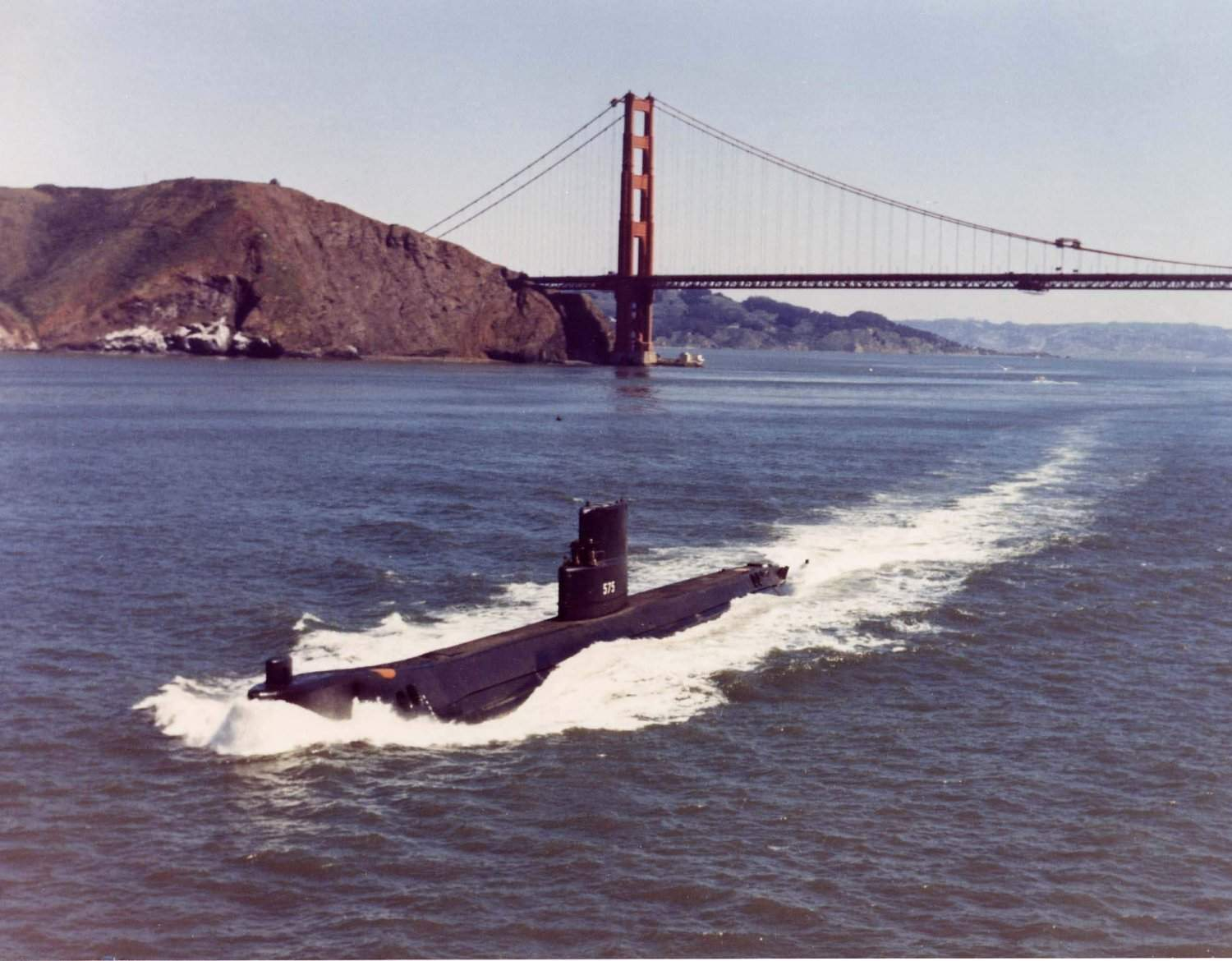

Class overview
- Builders: Electric Boat division of General Dynamics Corporation, Groton, Connecticut
- Operators: United States Navy
- Preceded by: USS Nautilus
- Succeeded by: Skate class; USS Darter
- Built: 1953
- In commission: 1957–1987

History

United States
- Awarded: 21 July 1952
- Builder: Electric Boat division of General Dynamics Corporation in Groton, Connecticut
- Laid down: 7 September 1953
- Launched: 21 July 1955
- Sponsored by: Mrs. W. Sterling Cole
- Commissioned: 30 March 1957
- Decommissioned: 30 March 1987
- Stricken: 10 July 1987
- Fate: Disposed of by submarine recycling 30 September 1997

General characteristics
- Type: Submarine
- Displacement: 3,260 tons surfaced; 4,150 tons submerged
- Length: 337 ft (103 m); 387 ft (118 m) post conversion
- Beam: 28 ft (8.5 m)
- Draft: 23 ft (7.0 m)
- Propulsion: S2G, replaced by S2Wa in 1960, geared steam turbines, two shafts, approx. 15,000 shp (11,000 kW)
- Speed: 23 knots (43 km/h; 26 mph) (43 km/h) surfaced, 19 knots (35 km/h; 22 mph) submerged
- Complement: 101 officers and enlisted
- Armament: 6 × 21-inch (533 mm) torpedo tubes

USS Seawolf (SSN-575) was the third ship of the United States Navy to be named for the seawolf, the second nuclear submarine, and the only U.S. submarine built with a liquid metal-cooled (sodium), beryllium-moderated nuclear reactor, the S2G. Her overall design (known as SCB 64A) was a variant of Nautilus, but with numerous detail changes, such as a conning tower, stepped sail, and BQR-4 passive sonar mounted in the top portion of the bow instead of further below. This sonar arrangement resulted in an unusual bow shape above the water for a U.S. submarine. Originally laid down in 1953, her distinctive reactor was later replaced with a standard pressurized-water reactor, the replacement process lasting from 12 December 1958 to 30 September 1960.

== Comparison to Nautilus ==
Seawolf was the same basic "double hull", twin-screw submarine design as her predecessor USS Nautilus (SSN-571), but her propulsion system was more technologically advanced. The Submarine Intermediate Reactor (SIR) nuclear plant was designed by General Electric's Knolls Atomic Power Laboratory and prototyped in West Milton, New York. The prototype plant was eventually designated S1G and Seawolf's plant as S2G.

The Atomic Energy Commission historians' account of the sodium-cooled reactor experience was:

Although makeshift repairs permitted the Seawolf to complete her initial sea trials on reduced power in February 1957, Rickover had already decided to abandon the sodium-cooled reactor. Early in November 1956, he informed the Commission that he would take steps toward replacing the reactor in Seawolf with a water-cooled plant similar to that in the Nautilus. The leaks in the Seawolf steam plant were an important factor in the decision, but even more persuasive were the inherent limitations in sodium-cooled systems. In Rickover's words, they were "expensive to build, complex to operate, susceptible to prolonged shutdown as a result of even minor malfunctions, and difficult and time-consuming to repair."

The S2G reactor was replaced with a pressurized-water reactor similar to Nautilus and designated S2Wa, the replacement process lasting from 12 December 1958 to 30 September 1960.

Although fully armed, Seawolf, like the first nuclear submarine, Nautilus, was primarily an experimental vessel. Seawolf was originally thought of publicly as a hunter-killer submarine, but in fact was intended to be a one-off test platform for the SIR (a.k.a. S2G) LMFR reactor and future sonar platforms. Her future uses, after the reactor plant was replaced with a light water system, included covert operations in foreign waters, for which she was converted from January 1971 to June 1973.

== Initial construction ==
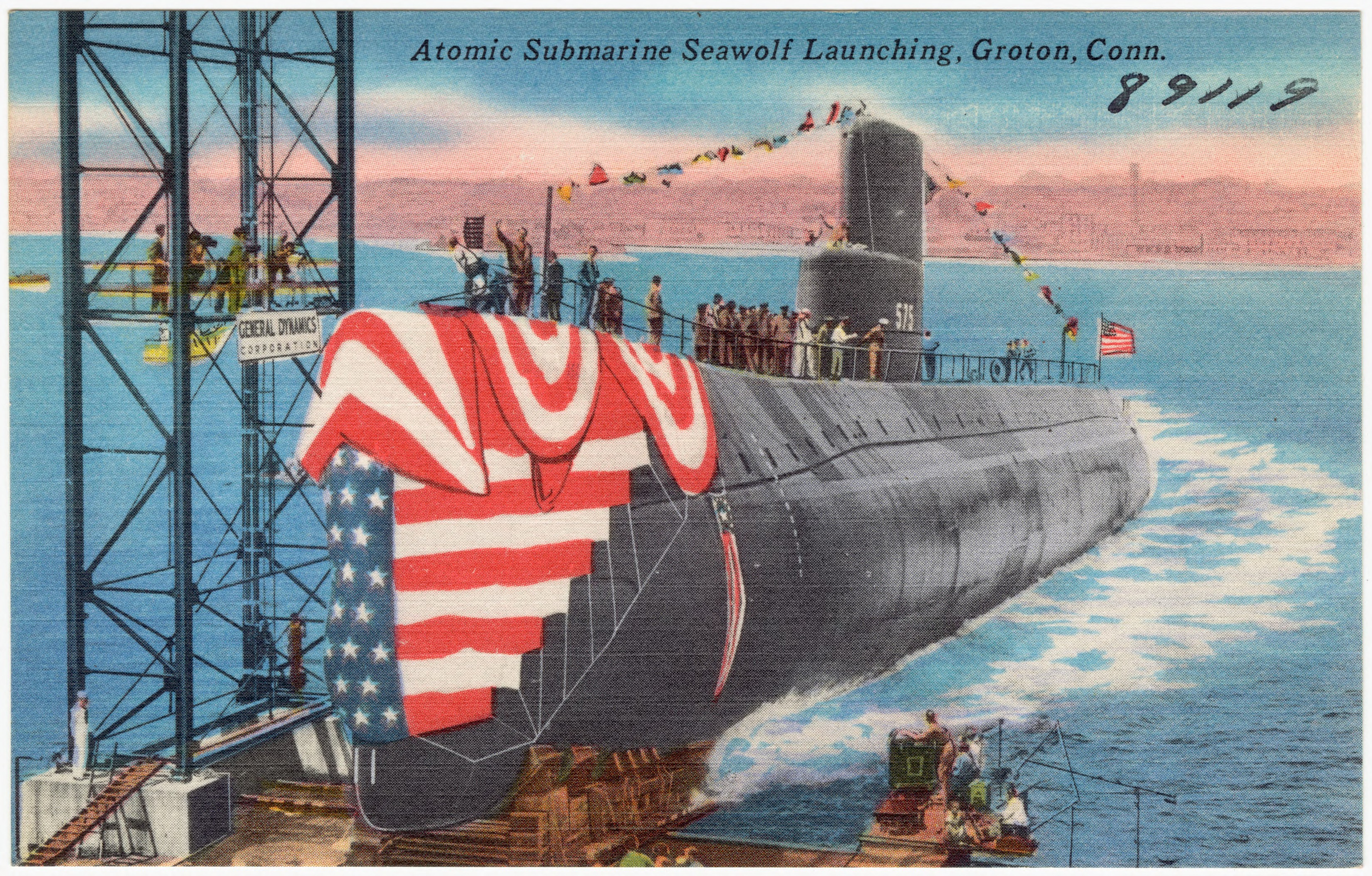
Postcard showing launch

Seawolf's keel was laid down 7 September 1953, by the Electric Boat (EB) division of General Dynamics Corporation in Groton, Connecticut. She was launched on 21 July 195, sponsored by Mary Elizabeth (Thomas) Cole, wife of New York Congressman W. Sterling Cole, and commissioned on 30 March 1957.

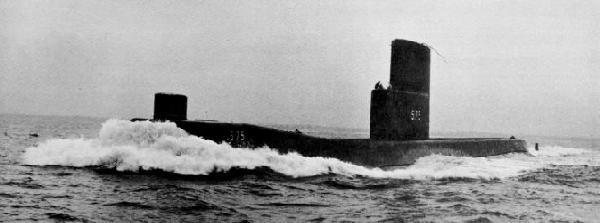
USS Seawolf

Like all of the original nuclear submarines, the project manager at EB was the general manager of the company, Bill Jones. During the parallel construction of the first nuclear submarines, the Navy, the Atomic Energy Commission, its independent laboratories, and the shipyard all worked together to learn together.

For the yard, the power-plant project manager was a separate function on these original nuclear boats. Dennis B. Boykin III led EB's power plant installation, and returned to the project two years later for the reactor conversion. His counterpart at the Office of Naval Reactors, Gardner Brown, did the same.

Lieutenant James Earl "Jimmy" Carter, the only U.S. President to qualify in submarines, was to be her engineering officer, but had resigned his commission upon the death of his father in 1953.

== 1957–1959 ==
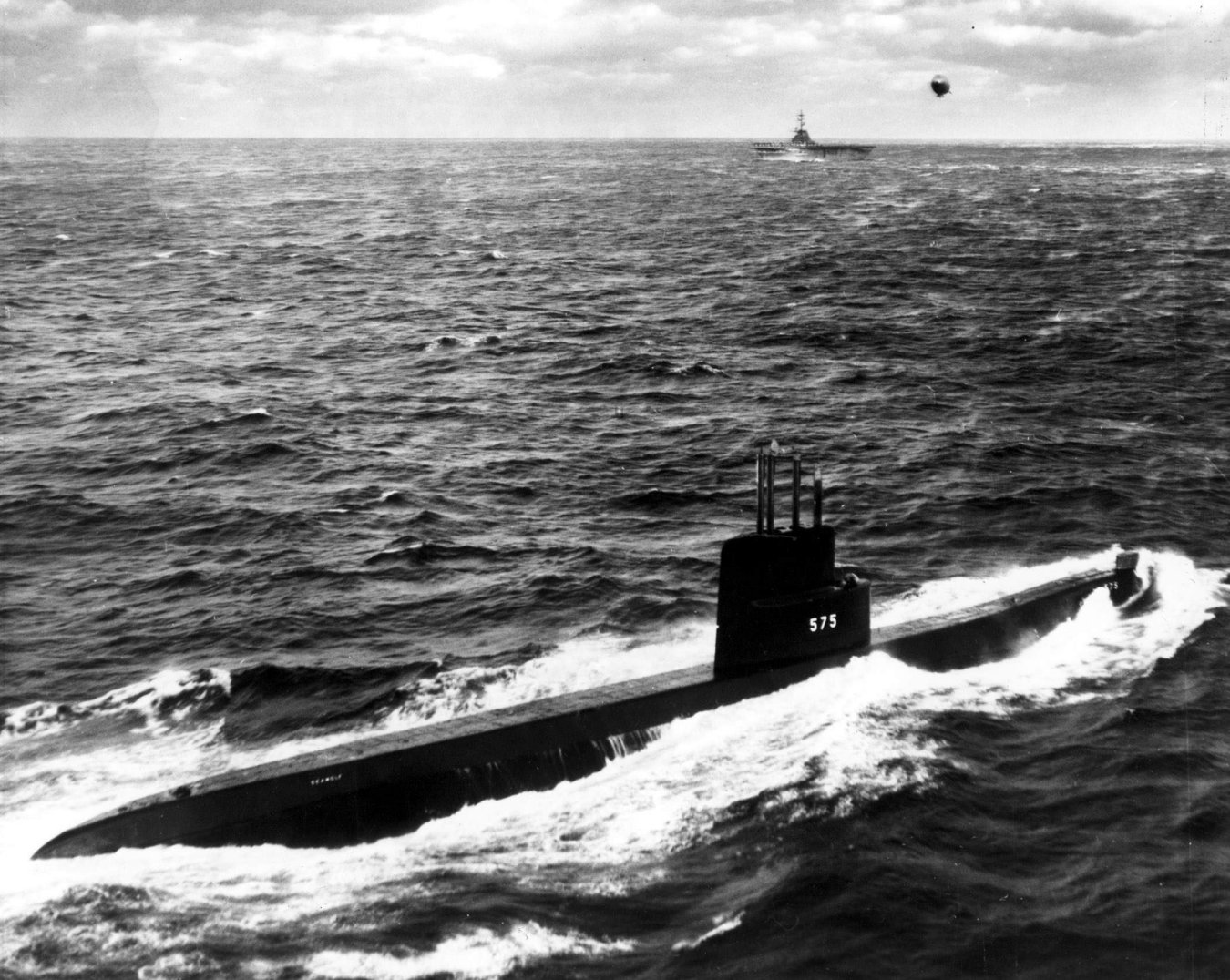
USS Seawolf

Seawolf departed New London, Connecticut, on 2 April for her shakedown cruise off Bermuda and returned on 8 May. Between 16 May and 5 August, she made two voyages to Key West and participated in intensive training exercises. On 3 September, she steamed across the North Atlantic to participate in NATO exercises. The submarine surfaced off Newport, Rhode Island, on 25 September after cruising 6,331 nautical miles (11,725 km; 7,286 mi) nonstop. The next day, President Dwight D. Eisenhower embarked and was taken for a short cruise onboard her.

Seawolf cruised to the Caribbean Sea for an exercise in November. In December, she began an availability period that lasted until 6 February 1958. She then participated in exercises along the East Coast until early August.

Seawolf submerged on 7 August and did not surface again until 6 October. During this period, she logged over 13,700 nautical miles (25,400 km; 15,800 mi). She received the Navy Unit Commendation for demonstrating the ability of the nuclear-powered submarine to remain independent of the atmosphere for the period of a normal war patrol.

Seawolf returned to EB in Groton on 12 December 1958, for conversion of her power plant from a S2G sodium-cooled LMFR to a S2Wa PWR. She was out of commission until 30 September 1960. The Office of Naval Reactors had determined that the unique superheated-steam powerplant was too difficult to maintain, since the superheaters were rarely operational. Constructed of rolled steel (vs. forged steel), the superheaters were usually unable to allow the plant to operate at full capacity.

On 18 April 1959, the Navy disposed of the radioactive S2G plant by sealing it in a 30-foot-high (9.1 m) stainless steel containment vessel, towing it out to sea on a barge, and then sinking the barge at a point about 120 miles (190 km) due east of Maryland in 9,100 feet (2,800 m) of water. Twenty-one years later, the Navy was unable to relocate the container, but said that the radioactive materials inside should decay before the containment vessel deteriorated.

== 1960–1966 ==
Seawolf began a 3-week period of independent operations on 25 October, and returned to fleet operations in November and December. On 9 January 1961, Seawolf sailed to San Juan, Puerto Rico, to participate in local operations. On 25 January, she was ordered to locate and track the Portuguese passenger liner Santa Maria, which had been seized by pirates two days earlier. The submarine made contact with the liner off the coast of Brazil on 1 February. After Santa Maria surrendered in Recife, the submarine returned to San Juan and continued East Coast operations.

On 7 July, Seawolf began a 2-month oceanographic voyage that took her to Portsmouth, England, before returning to New London on 19 September 1961.

In 1963, Seawolf participated in the search for the lost submarine USS Thresher and in various local and fleet operations until April 1964. On 28 April, Seawolf stood out of New London en route to the Mediterranean Sea and a 3 1/2-month deployment with the Sixth Fleet. During the period, she operated with aircraft carrier USS Enterprise, guided-missile cruiser Long Beach, and guided-missile destroyer Bainbridge as a part of the world's first nuclear task force. More local East Coast exercises followed until 5 May 1965. On that date, the submarine entered the Portsmouth Naval Shipyard for refueling and an extensive overhaul, bringing her up to the SUBSAFE standard put in place after the loss of Thresher. This overhaul lasted until September 1966.

== 1967–1973 ==
Seawolf sailed from Portsmouth, New Hampshire, on 24 August 1967 for New London, Connecticut, which was again her home port. The following month, she sailed to the Caribbean for refresher training and weapons trials. She had to have a propeller replaced at Charleston, South Carolina, in early October and then conducted sea trials in the Bahama Islands for the remainder of the month. The end of 1967 found her back at her home port.

Seawolf was operating from that port when she grounded off the coast of Maine on 30 January 1968, badly crushing her stern. She was towed back to New London for repairs and did not put to sea again until 20 March 1969, when she began sea trials. The submarine was in the Caribbean during June and July, conducting underwater sound and weapons-systems tests. Seawolf was deployed with the Sixth Fleet from 29 September to 21 December 1969.

Seawolf operated along the East Coast until 9 November 1970, when her home port was changed to Vallejo, California, and she sailed for the West Coast. The submarine transited the Panama Canal on 17 November and changed operational control to Submarine Force, Pacific Fleet. In the Pacific, Seawolf served as a "spy submarine", trailing other submarines, retrieving test weapons from the seabed, and tapping Soviet submarine communications cables.

Upon arrival at Mare Island Naval Shipyard, she entered drydock on 8 January 1971 for overhaul and conversion to a special project platform. The sense of the euphemistic "special project platform" can be gleaned from photos of the ships from before and after the renovation. The 52-foot (16 m) hull extension forward of the sail held intelligence-gathering equipment that supported covert operations, including an "aquarium" for launching variable-depth sonar and retrieval equipment. For precise maneuvering, she gained jet thrusters. A saturation diver lockout was installed inside the hull, and a new gondola underneath the hull held retractable "skegs" (short for "sea-keeping legs") for bottom station keeping. The boat remained there until 21 June 1973, when she moved up the coast to Bangor, Washington. She remained a special projects boat until decommissioning.

Seawolf returned to Mare Island on 4 September 1973. Despite the frequent rebuilds, though, age was beginning to show on the craft. Records describe frequent fires and reactor scrams, life-support oxygenation failures, and crewmembers on amphetamines to maintain stamina.

== 1974–1978 ==
In 1974, Seawolf completed postconversion testing and evaluation period and conducted her first Pacific Fleet deployment, operating independently for a period of 3 months. For performance of duty, she was awarded a second Navy Unit Commendation. In 1975, Seawolf came under the exclusive direction of Submarine Development Group One, and for outstanding performance in 1974–1975, was awarded a battle efficiency "E".

In 1976, Seawolf received her second consecutive "E" and the "Engineering E" for excellence. During her second Pacific Fleet deployment, she conducted independent submerged operations for 3 months and demonstrated superior endurance by remaining submerged for 89 consecutive days, a U.S. Navy record. She received her third Navy Unit Commendation.

In 1977, Seawolf received her third "E" and her second "Engineering E" for excellence. During her third Pacific Fleet deployment, she conducted 79 consecutive days of independent submerged operations and received her fourth Navy Unit Commendation and the Navy Expeditionary Medal. In 1978, Seawolf conducted her fourth Pacific Fleet deployment.

== 1980–1987 ==
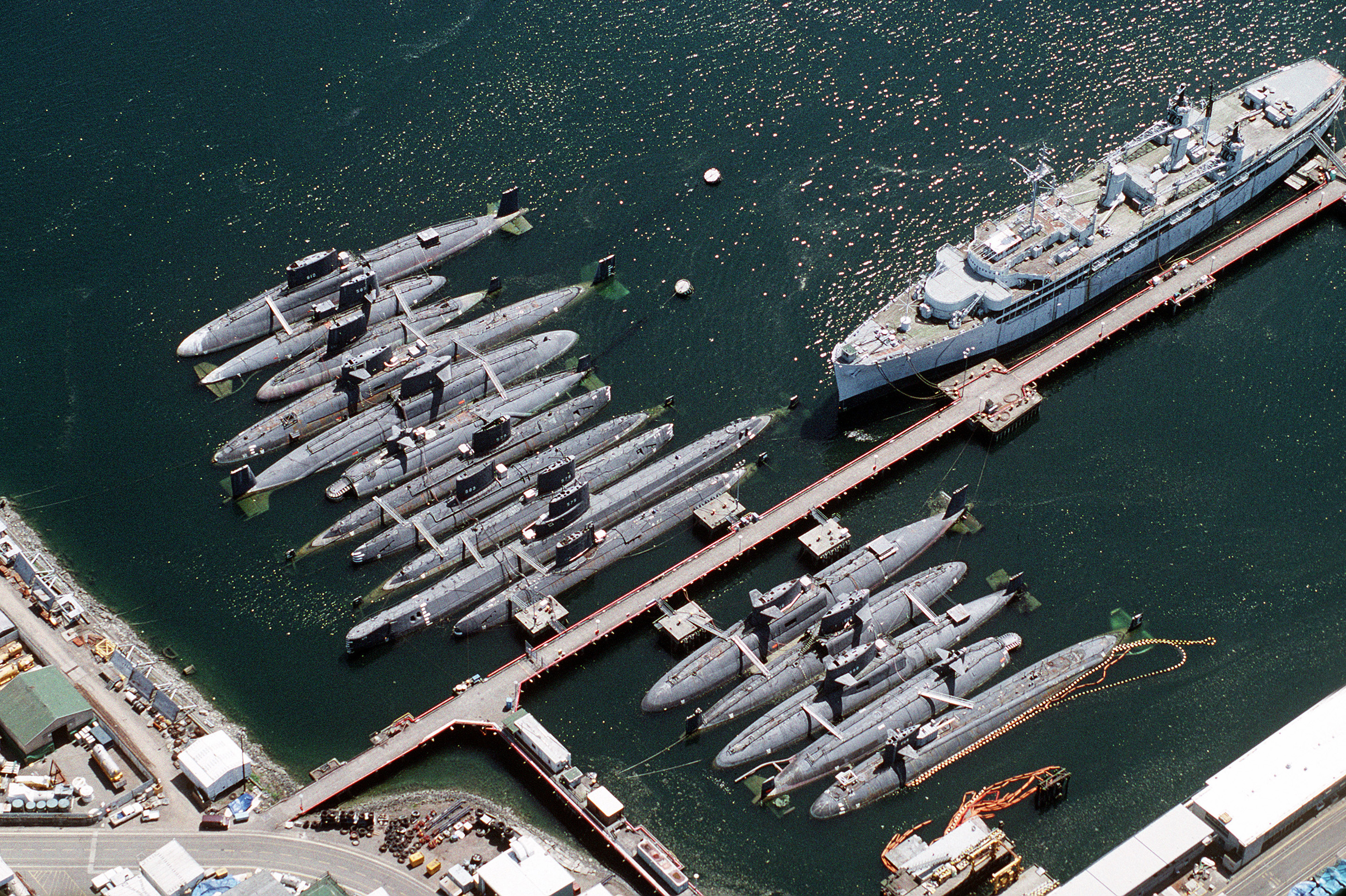
Decommissioned submarines at Puget Sound in 1993. Seawolf is the long hull, second above the jetty, recognizable by the stepped sail and the unusual bow shape.

On February 29, 1980, a turbine generator failed during sea trials, causing a major fire in the engine room, sending the ship back to drydock for 2 months, to enable a "soft patch" hull cut to remove one of the ship's large diesel engines, which had melted on the end nearest the casualty.

In August 1981, Seawolf deployed on her fifth Pacific Fleet deployment. By that point, the struggles to maintain the aged boat had stressed crew morale close to breaking. Between missions, crewmembers had participated in makeshift target practice on mudflats near the base, or indulged in recreational marijuana contrary to naval regulations (and possibly as a scheme to make themselves ineligible for duty). Nevertheless, the boat proceeded to tap a submarine communications cable in the Sea of Okhotsk, where she found herself trapped by an extreme storm. Although most submarines are isolated from surface weather by boundary layer effects, the typhoon was sufficiently strong to shake Seawolf so that her skegs dug into the seabed and clogged the reactor heat exchanger with sand. In freeing herself, she ripped away from the underbelly gondola, leaving interior parts free to bang against the hull. Without classic submarine silence, the submarine was easily detected by a Soviet fishing trawler, but managed to outlast the ship into international waters. Seawolf returned to homeport in October 1981, and received another Navy Expeditionary Medal.

In 1983, Seawolf conducted her sixth Pacific Fleet deployment of 76 days and returned to Mare Island Naval Shipyard in May 1983. She was awarded the Navy Expeditionary Medal, another Battle Efficiency "E", another "Engineering E," a Supply "E" and a Damage Control "DC". In 1984, Seawolf conducted a 93-day deployment to the Western Pacific, returned in July, and continued her high operating tempo with numerous local operations. She was awarded her third consecutive Supply "E", a Communications "C", and the Deck Seamanship Award.

In April 1986, Seawolf conducted her last Western Pacific deployment and returned to Mare Island in June 1986 to prepare for decommissioning. Decommissioned on 30 March 1987, Seawolf was stricken from the Naval Vessel Register the following 10 July. The former submarine began the Navy's Ship-Submarine Recycling Program on 1 October 1996 and completed it on 30 September 1997.

== Awards ==
- Navy Unit Commendation with three stars (4 awards)
- Meritorious Unit Commendation
- Navy "E" Ribbon (3 awards)
- Navy Expeditionary Medal with two stars (3 awards)
- National Defense Service Medal
