= Naval Reactors Facility =

United States Department of Energy nuclear reactor facility

Coordinates: 43°38′56″N 112°54′58″W

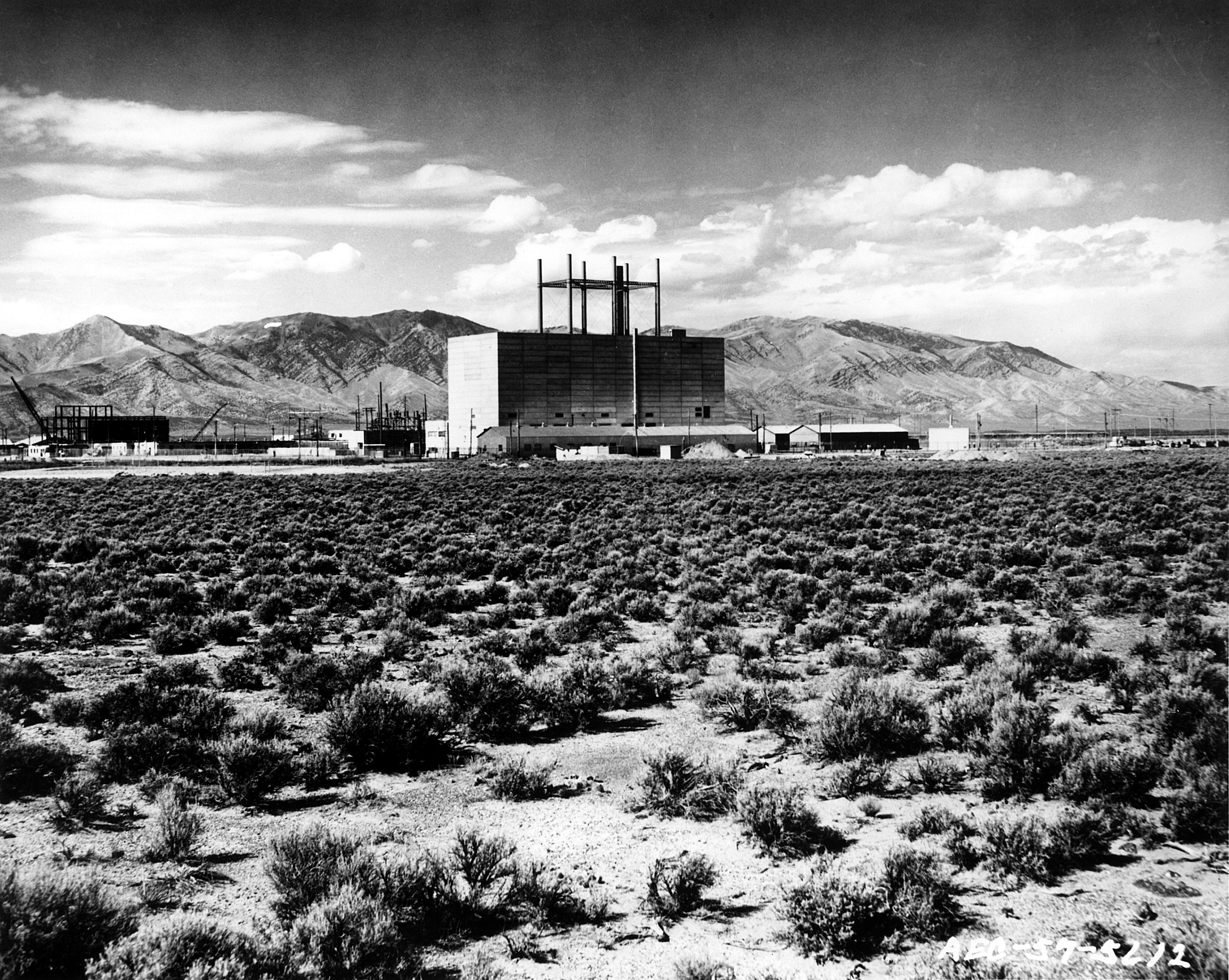
View from outside, circa 1957.

The Naval Reactors Facility (NRF) is located 52 miles (84 km) northwest of Idaho Falls, Idaho. The NRF is a United States Department of Energy-Naval Reactors facility where three nuclear propulsion prototypes A1W, S1W and S5G were located. It is contractor-operated for the government by Fluor Corporation through their subsidiary, Fluor Marine Propulsion, LLC, which also operates Bettis Atomic Power Laboratory and Knolls Atomic Power Laboratory.

From the early 1950s to the mid-1990s, NRF supported the U.S. Navy's nuclear-powered fleet by testing reactor designs, receiving spent nuclear fuel for processing and storage, and training nearly 40,000 Navy personnel to operate surface and submarine nuclear power plants.

The only remaining active facility at NRF is the Expended Core Facility / Dry Storage Facility, which provides for storage of spent fuel from U.S. Naval reactors.

NRF is part of the Idaho National Laboratory.

== See also ==
- United States naval reactors
