= Hyman G. Rickover =

US Navy admiral

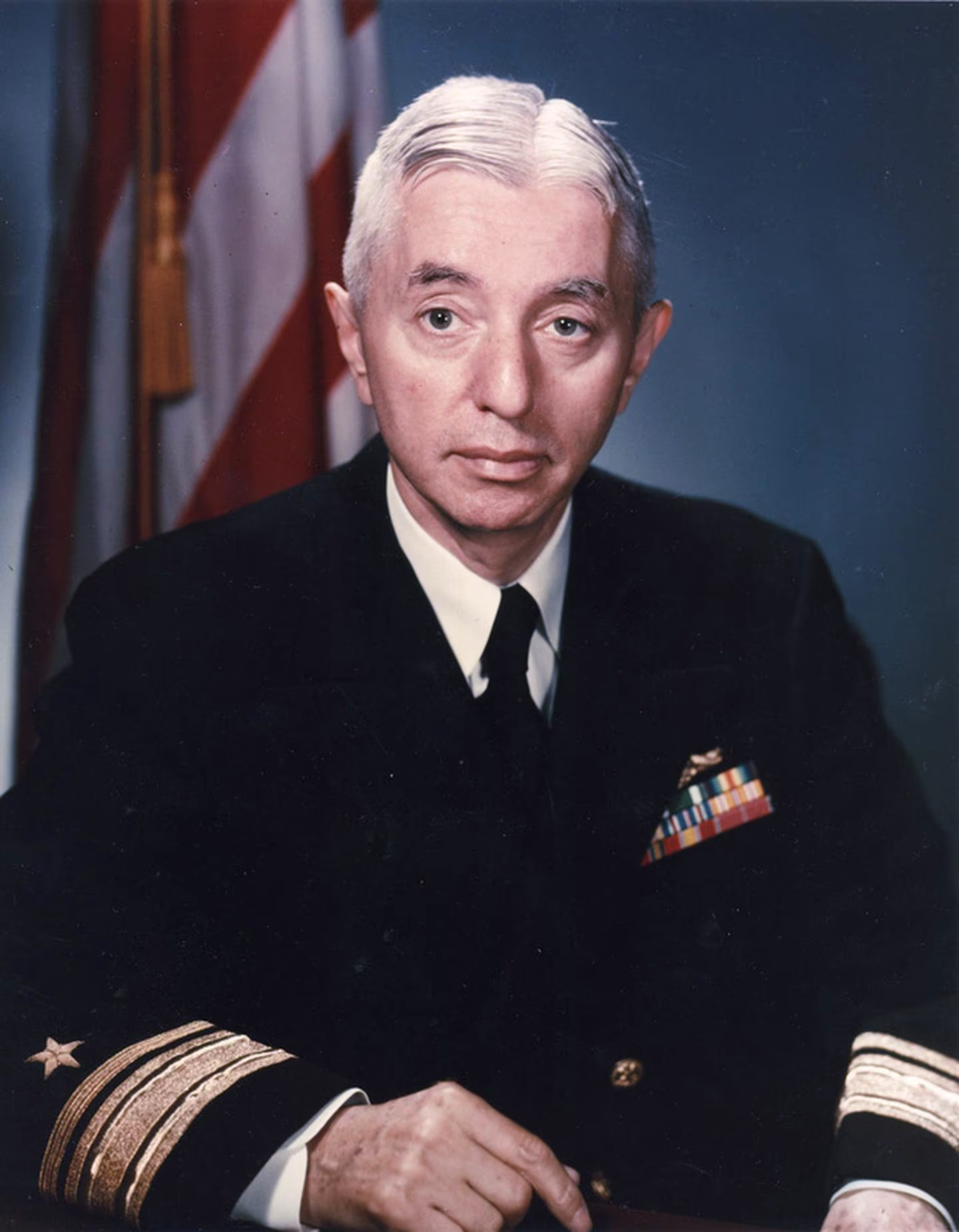
- Official portrait, 1955
- Born: Chaim Godalia Rickover; 27 January 1900; Maków Mazowiecki, Łomża Governorate, Congress Poland
- Died: 8 July 1986 (aged 86); Arlington County, Virginia, U.S.
- Education: United States Naval Academy; Columbia University (MSEE)
- Spouse(s): Ruth D. Masters (1931–1972 (her death); 1 child); Eleonore A. Bednowicz (1974–1986 (his death))
- Military career
- Allegiance: United States
- Branch: United States Navy
- Service years: 1918–1982
- Rank: Admiral
- Nicknames: "Father of the Nuclear Navy"; "The Kindly Old Gentleman," or simply "KOG"
- Commands: USS Finch; Naval Reactors
- Conflicts: World War II
- Awards: Navy Distinguished Service Medal (3); Legion of Merit (2); Congressional Gold Medal (2); Presidential Medal of Freedom; Enrico Fermi Award

Hyman George Rickover (27 January 1900 – 8 July 1986) was an admiral in the United States Navy. He directed the original development of naval nuclear propulsion and controlled its operations for three decades as director of the U.S. Naval Reactors office. In addition, he oversaw the development of the Shippingport Atomic Power Station, the world's first commercial pressurized water reactor used for generating electricity. Rickover is also one of seven people who have been awarded two Congressional Gold Medals.

Rickover is known as the "Father of the Nuclear Navy," and his influence on the Navy and its warships was of such scope that he "may well go down in history as one of the Navy's most important officers." He served in a flag rank for nearly 30 years (1953 to 1982), ending his career as a four-star admiral. His years of service exceeded that of each of the U.S. Navy's five-star fleet admirals—Leahy, King, Nimitz and Halsey—all of whom served on active duty for life after their appointments. Rickover's total of 63 years of active duty service makes him the longest-serving naval officer, as well as the longest-serving member of the U.S. armed forces in history.

Having become a naval engineering duty officer (EDO) in 1937 after serving as both a surface ship and submarine-qualified unrestricted line officer, his substantial legacy of technical achievements includes the United States Navy's continuing record of zero reactor accidents.

== Early life and education ==
Rickover was born Chaim Gdala Rykower to Abraham and Rachel/Ruchla Lea (née Unger) Rykower, a Polish Jewish family from Maków Mazowiecki in Vistula Land. His parents changed his name to "Hyman" which is derived from Chayyim, meaning "life". He did not use his middle name Godalia (a form of Gedaliah), but he substituted "George" when at the Naval Academy.

In 1906 (aged six), Rickover made passage to New York City with his mother and sister, fleeing anti-Semitic Russian pogroms during the Revolution of 1905. (Note: Born to a Jewish family in a part of Poland under Russian rule in 1900, Rickover fled with his parents to the United States in 1905 in an effort to avoid Russian-instigated pogroms.) They joined Abraham, who had made earlier trips there beginning in 1897 to become established. Rickover's family lived initially on the East Side of Manhattan but moved two years later to North Lawndale, Chicago, which was a heavily Jewish neighborhood at the time, where Rickover's father continued work as a tailor. Rickover took his first paid job at age nine, earning three cents an hour (equivalent to $1.07 in 2025) for holding a light as his neighbor operated a machine. Later, he delivered groceries. He graduated from grammar school at 14.

Rickover attended John Marshall Metropolitan High School in Chicago and graduated with honors in 1918. He then held a full-time job as a telegraph boy delivering Western Union telegrams, through which he became acquainted with Congressman Adolph J. Sabath, a Czech Jewish immigrant. Sabath nominated Rickover for appointment to the United States Naval Academy. Rickover was only a third alternate for appointment, but he passed the entrance exam and was accepted.

== Naval career through World War II ==
Rickover's naval career began in 1918 at the Naval Academy; at this time, attending military academies was considered active duty service, due in part to World War I. On 2 June 1922, Rickover graduated 107th out of 540 midshipmen and was commissioned as an ensign. He joined the destroyer La Vallette on 5 September 1922. Rickover impressed his commanding officer with his hard work and efficiency, and was made engineer officer on 21 June 1923, becoming the youngest such officer in the squadron.

He next served on board the battleship USS Nevada before earning a Master of Science degree in electrical engineering from Columbia University in 1930 by way of a year at the Naval Postgraduate School and further coursework at Columbia.

Rickover had a high regard for the quality of the education he received at Columbia, as demonstrated in this excerpt from a speech he gave at the university some 52 years after attending:

Columbia was the first institution that encouraged me to think rather than memorize. My teachers were notable in that many had gained practical engineering experience outside the university and were able to share their experience with their students. I am grateful, among others, to Professors Morecroft, Hehre, and Arendt. Much of what I have subsequently learned and accomplished in engineering is based on the solid foundation of principles I learned from them.

Rickover preferred life on smaller ships, and he also knew that young officers in the submarine service were advancing quickly, so he went to Washington and volunteered for submarine duty. His application was turned down due to his age, at that time 29 years. Fortunately for Rickover, he encountered his former commanding officer from Nevada while leaving the building, who interceded successfully on his behalf. From 1929 to 1933, Rickover qualified for submarine duty and command aboard the submarines S-9 and S-48. While aboard S-48 he was addressed a letter of commendation from the Secretary of the Navy "for rescuing Augustin Pasis ... from drowning at the Submarine Base, Coco Solo, Canal Zone." While at the Office of the Inspector of Naval Material in Philadelphia, Pennsylvania in 1933, Rickover translated Das Unterseeboot (The Submarine) by World War I German Imperial Navy Admiral Hermann Bauer. Rickover's translation became a basic text for the U.S. submarine service.

On 17 July 1937, he reported aboard the minesweeper Finch at Qingdao, China, and assumed what would be his only ship command with additional duty as Commander, Mine Division Three, Asiatic Fleet. The Marco Polo Bridge Incident had occurred ten days earlier. In August, Finch stood out for Shanghai to protect American citizens and interests from the conflict between Chinese and Japanese forces. On 25 September, Rickover was promoted to lieutenant commander, retroactive to 1 July. In October, his designation as an engineering duty officer became effective, and he was relieved of his three-month command of Finch at Shanghai on 5 October 1937.

Rickover was assigned to the Cavite Navy Yard in the Philippines, and was transferred shortly thereafter to the Bureau of Engineering in Washington, D.C. Once there, he took up his duties as assistant chief of the Electrical section of the Bureau of Engineering on 15 August 1939.

On 10 April 1942, after America's entry into World War II, Rickover flew to Pearl Harbor to organize repairs to the electrical power plant of USS California. Rickover had been promoted to the rank of commander on 1 January 1942, and in late June of that year was made a temporary captain. In late 1944 he appealed for a transfer to an active command. He was sent to investigate inefficiencies at the naval supply depot at Mechanicsburg, Pennsylvania, then was appointed in July 1945 to command of a ship repair facility on Okinawa. Shortly thereafter, his command was destroyed by Typhoon Louise, and he subsequently spent some time helping to teach school to Okinawan children.

Later in the war, his service as head of the Electrical Section in the Bureau of Ships brought him a Legion of Merit and gave him experience in directing large development programs, choosing talented technical people, and working closely with private industry. Time magazine featured him on the cover of its 11 January 1954 issue. The accompanying article described his wartime service:

Sharp-tongued Hyman Rickover spurred his men to exhaustion, ripped through red tape, drove contractors into rages. He went on making enemies, but by the end of the war he had won the rank of captain. He had also won a reputation as a man who gets things done.

== Naval Reactors and the Atomic Energy Commission ==
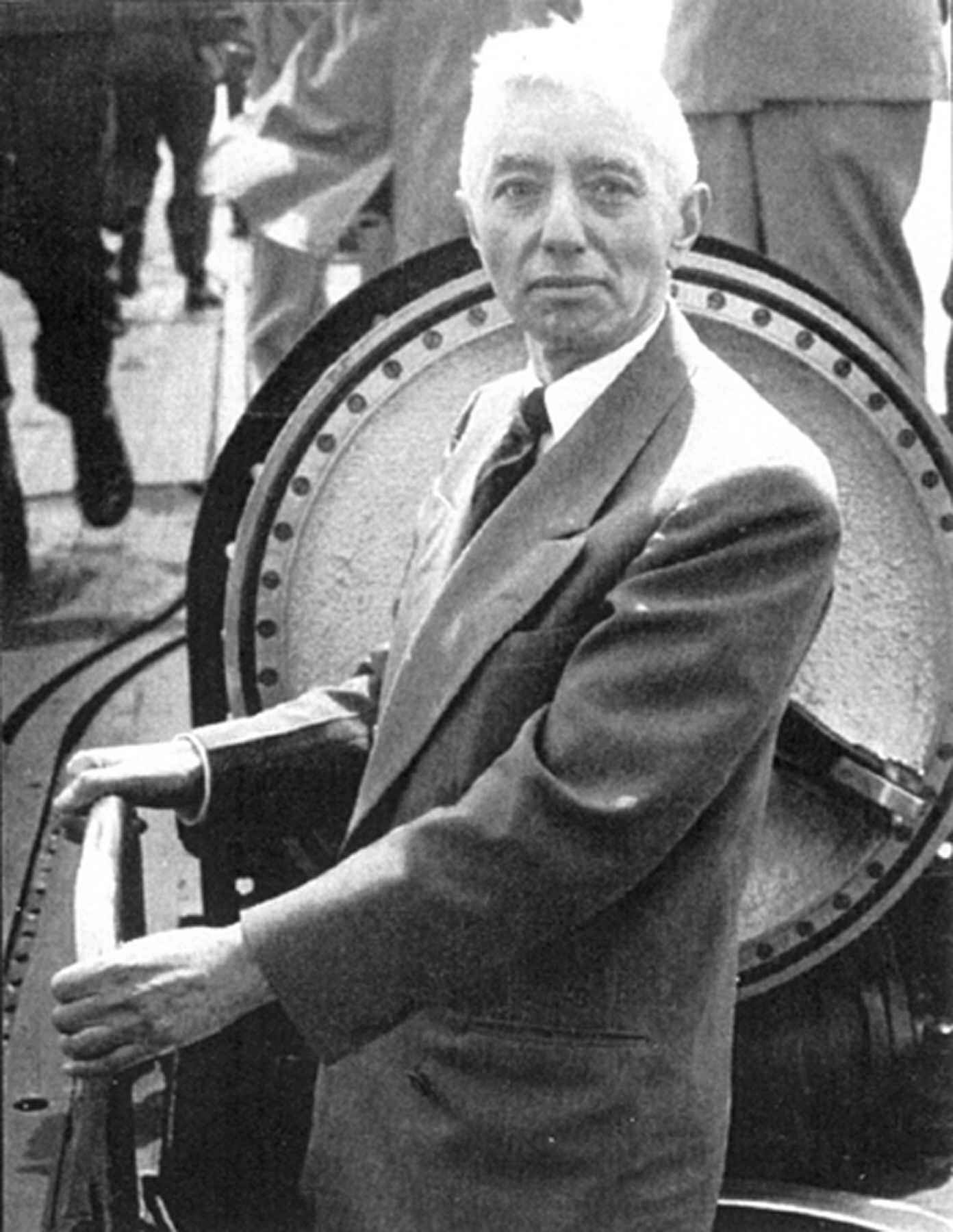
Admiral Rickover aboard USS Nautilus, the world's first nuclear-powered vessel. "I did not recruit extraordinary people. I recruited people who had extraordinary potential—and then I trained them"

In December 1945, Rickover was appointed Inspector General of the 19th Fleet on the west coast, and was assigned to work with General Electric at Schenectady, New York, to develop a nuclear propulsion plant for destroyers. In 1946, an initiative was begun at the Manhattan Project's Clinton Laboratory (now the Oak Ridge National Laboratory) to develop a nuclear electric generating plant. Realizing the potential that nuclear energy held for the Navy, Rickover applied. Rickover was sent to Oak Ridge through the efforts of his wartime boss, Rear Admiral Earle Mills, who became the head of the Navy's Bureau of Ships that same year.

Rickover became an early convert to the idea of nuclear marine propulsion, and was the driving force for shifting the Navy's initial focus from applications on destroyers to submarines. Rickover's vision was not initially shared by his immediate superiors: he was recalled from Oak Ridge and assigned "advisory duties" with an office in an abandoned ladies' room in the Navy Building. He subsequently went around several layers of superior officers, and in 1947 went directly to the Chief of Naval Operations, Fleet Admiral Chester Nimitz, also a former submariner. Nimitz immediately understood the potential of nuclear propulsion in submarines and recommended the project to the Secretary of the Navy, John L. Sullivan. Sullivan's endorsement to build the world's first nuclear-powered vessel, USS Nautilus, later caused Rickover to state that Sullivan was "the true father of the Nuclear Navy."

Subsequently, Rickover became chief of a new section in the Bureau of Ships, the Nuclear Power Division reporting to Mills. He began work with Alvin M. Weinberg, the Oak Ridge director of research, to initiate and develop the Oak Ridge School of Reactor Technology and to begin the design of the pressurized water reactor for submarine propulsion. In February 1949 he was assigned to the Atomic Energy Commission's Division of Reactor Development, and then assumed control of the Navy's effort within the AEC as Director of the Naval Reactors Branch. This twin role enabled him to lead the effort to develop Nautilus.

The original selection of Rickover as head of development of the nation's nuclear submarine program ultimately rested with Admiral Mills. According to Lieutenant General Leslie Groves, director of the Manhattan Project, Mills was anxious to have a very determined man involved. He knew that Rickover was "not too easy to get along with" and "not too popular," but in his judgement Rickover was the man on whom the Navy could depend "no matter what opposition he might encounter".

While his team and industry were completing construction of Nautilus, Rickover was promoted to the rank of rear admiral in 1953. However, this was anything but routine, and occurred only after an extraordinary chain of events:

[Rickover's] peers in the Navy's engineer branch thought to get rid of him through failure of promotion above captain. This would entail automatic retirement at the thirty-year mark. But someone made the case to the U.S. Senate, charged by the Constitution with formal confirmation of military promotions. In that year, 1953, two years before Nautilus first went to sea, the Senate failed to give its usual perfunctory approval of the Navy admiral promotion list, and the press was outraged because Rickover's name was not on it. ... Ultimately an enlightened Secretary of the Navy, Robert B. Anderson, ordered a special selection board to sit. With some shuffling of feet it did what it had been ordered to do. ... Ninety-five percent of Navy captains must retire regardless of how highly qualified because there are only vacancies for 5 percent of them to become admirals, and although vindictiveness has sometimes played a part in determining who shall fail of selection for promotion (thus also violating the system), never before or since have pressures from outside the Navy overturned this form of career-termination.

Regardless of the challenges faced in developing and operating brand-new technology, Rickover and the team did not disappoint: the result was a highly reliable nuclear reactor in a form-factor that would fit into a submarine hull with no more than a 28-foot (8.5 m) beam. This became known as the S1W reactor. Nautilus was launched and commissioned with this reactor in 1954.

Later Rickover oversaw the development of the Shippingport Atomic Power Station, the first commercial pressurized water reactor nuclear power plant. Kenneth Nichols of the AEC decided that the Rickover-Westinghouse pressurized-water reactor was "the best choice for a reactor to demonstrate the production of electricity" with Rickover "having a going organization and a reactor project under way that now had no specific use to justify it." This was a reference to the first core used at Shippingport originating from a cancelled nuclear-powered aircraft carrier. This was accepted by Lewis Strauss and the Commission in January 1954.

Rickover was promoted to vice admiral in 1958, the same year that he was awarded the first of two Congressional Gold Medals. He exercised tight control for the next three decades over the ships, technology, and personnel of the nuclear Navy, interviewing and approving or denying every prospective officer being considered for a nuclear ship. Over the course of Rickover's career, these personal interviews numbered in the tens of thousands; over 14,000 interviews were with recent college-graduates alone. The interviewees ranged from midshipmen and newly commissioned ensigns destined for nuclear-powered submarines and surface combatants, to very senior combat-experienced naval aviator captains who sought command of nuclear-powered aircraft carriers. The content of most of these interviews has been lost to history, though some were later chronicled in several books on Rickover's career, as well as in a rare personal interview with Diane Sawyer in 1984.

In 1973, though his role and responsibilities remained unchanged, Rickover was promoted to the rank of four-star admiral. This was the second time (after Samuel Murray Robinson) in the history of the U.S. Navy that an officer with a career path other than an operational line officer achieved that rank. Because his responsibilities did not include direct command and control of combatant naval units, technically Rickover was appointed to the grade of admiral on the retired list so as to provide some clarity on this issue. This was also done to avoid affecting the maximum-authorized number of admirals (O-10) on the "active list."

As head of Naval Reactors, Rickover's focus and responsibilities were dedicated to reactor safety rather than tactical or strategic submarine warfare training. However, this extreme focus was well known during Rickover's era as a potential hindrance to balancing operational priorities. One way that this was addressed after Rickover retired was that only the very strongest, former at-sea submarine commanders have held Rickover's now unique eight-year position as NAVSEA-08, the longest chartered tenure in the U.S. military. From Rickover's first replacement, Kinnaird R. McKee, to today's head of Naval Reactors, William J. Houston, all have held command of nuclear submarines, their squadrons and ocean fleets, but none have been a long-term Engineering Duty Officer such as Rickover. In keeping with Rickover's promotion to four-star admiral, those who were subsequently selected for assignment to Director, Naval Reactors are promoted to this same rank, but also on active duty status.

Historian Francis Duncan, who for over eight years was granted generous access to diverse numbers and levels of witnesses—including U.S. presidents—as well as Rickover himself, came to the conclusion that the man was best understood with respect to a guiding principle that Rickover invoked foremost for both himself and those who served in the U.S. Navy's nuclear propulsion program: "exercise of the concept of responsibility." This is further evidenced by Rickover listing responsibility as his first principle in his final-years paper and speech, Thoughts on Man's Purpose in Life.

=== Safety record ===
Rickover's stringent standards are largely credited with being responsible for the U.S. Navy's continuing record of zero reactor accidents (defined as the uncontrolled release of fission products to the environment resulting from damage to a reactor core). He made a point of being aboard during the initial sea trial of almost every nuclear submarine completing its new-construction period. Following the Three Mile Island accident on March 28, 1979, Admiral Rickover was asked to testify before Congress in the general context of answering the question as to why naval nuclear propulsion had succeeded in achieving a record of zero reactor-accidents, as opposed to the dramatic one that had just taken place.

The accident-free record of United States Navy reactor operations stands in some very stark contrast to those of the Soviet Union, which had fourteen known reactor accidents. As stated in a retrospective analysis in October 2007:

U.S. submarines far outperformed the Soviet ones in the crucial area of stealth, and Rickover's obsessive fixation on safety and quality control gave the U.S. nuclear Navy a vastly superior safety record to the Soviet one.

=== Views on nuclear power ===
Given Rickover's single-minded focus on naval nuclear propulsion, design, and operations, it came as a surprise to many in 1982, near the end of his career, when he testified before the U.S. Congress that, were it up to him what to do with nuclear powered ships, he "would sink them all." At a congressional hearing Rickover testified that:

Every time you produce radiation, you produce something that has a certain half-life, in some cases for billions of years. ... I do not believe that nuclear power is worth the present benefits since it creates radiation. You might ask why do I design nuclear powered ships. That is because it is a necessary evil. I would sink them all. I am not proud of the part I played in it. I did it because it was necessary for the safety of this country. That's why I am such a great exponent of stopping this whole nonsense of war. Unfortunately, attempts to limit war have always failed. One lesson of history is when a war erupts every nation will ultimately use whatever weapon is available. ...It is important that we control these forces and try to eliminate them.

— Economics of Defense Policy: Hearing before the Joint Economic Committee, Congress of the United States, 97th Cong., 2nd sess., Pt. 1 (1982)

A few months later, following his retirement, Rickover spoke more specifically regarding the questions "Could you comment on your own responsibility in helping to create a nuclear navy? Do you have any regrets?":

I do not have regrets. I believe I helped preserve the peace for this country. Why should I regret that? What I accomplished was approved by Congress—which represents our people. All of you live in safety from domestic enemies because of security from the police. Likewise, you live in safety from foreign enemies because our military keeps them from attacking us. Nuclear technology was already under development in other countries. My assigned responsibility was to develop our nuclear navy. I managed to accomplish this.

== Focus on education ==
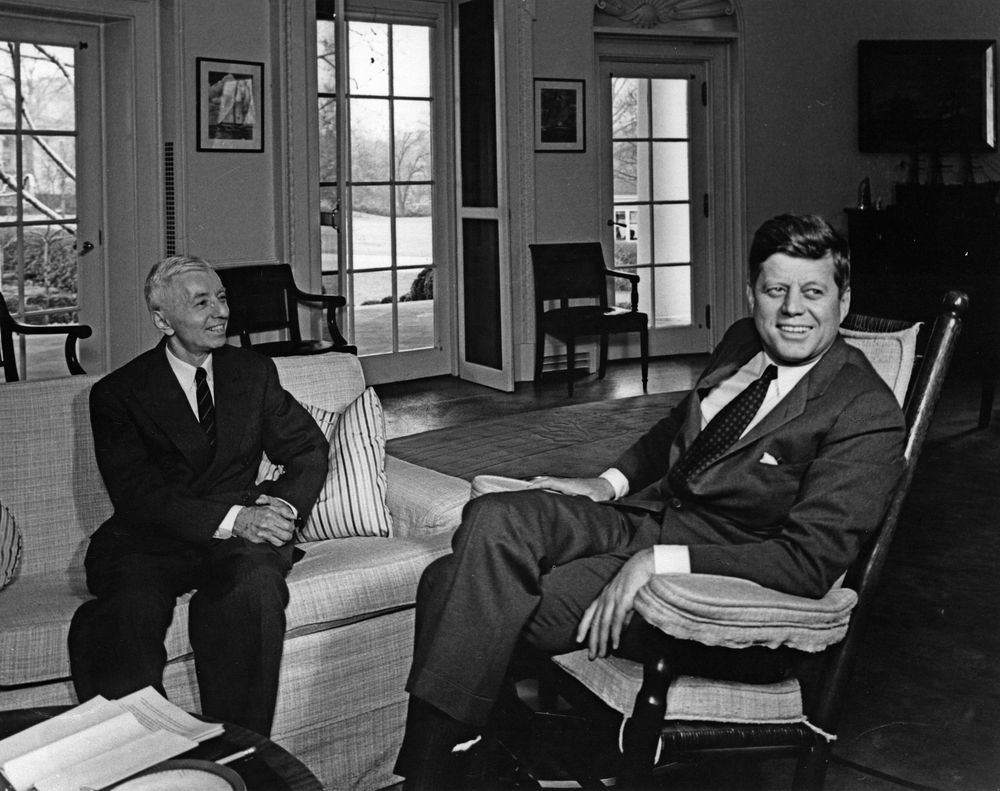
President Kennedy and Rickover, White House, 11 February 1963 "...in addition to the multilateral POLARIS force, we discussed education and how he and I were brought up as boys"

When he was a child still living in Russian-occupied Poland, Rickover was not allowed to attend public schools because of his Jewish faith. Starting at the age of four, he attended a religious school where the teaching was solely from the Tanakh, i.e. the Old Testament, in Hebrew. Following his formal education in the United States, Rickover developed a decades-long and outspoken interest in the educational standards of the US as being a national security issue, particularly as compared during the Cold War era to those of Soviet Russia.

An example of his passion for education from his 1959 Report on Russia in the context of comparative educational systems:

There is no room here (in nuclear powerplant development) for lofty theories which do not work out in practice. We would not get anywhere if we had the loose, hazy thinking you encounter when you bring out the obvious failures of the American educational system...there are times when it is irresponsible to avoid criticizing something which one knows to be wrong and dangerous for the Nation as a whole. I feel that every one who has a position of responsibility in this country and who can see and understand what is happening not only has the right, he has the obligation and the duty to speak. ... This is why I feel so strongly about education—about our failure to give our children as good an education as they deserve and need...It is my considered opinion that there is no problem that faces the Congress or the country that is as important.

Rickover believed that US standards of education were unacceptably low. His first book centered on education was a collection of essays calling for improved educational standards, particularly in math and science, entitled Education and Freedom (1959). In it, he stated that "education is the most important problem facing the United States today" and "only the massive upgrading of the scholastic standards of our schools will guarantee the future prosperity and freedom of the Republic." A second book, Swiss Schools and Ours (1962) was a scathing comparison of the educational systems of Switzerland and America. He argued that the higher standards of Swiss schools, including a longer school day and year, combined with an approach stressing student choice and academic specialization, produced superior results.

Recognizing that "nurturing careers of excellence and leadership in science and technology in young scholars is an essential investment in the United States national and global future," Rickover founded the Center for Excellence in Education following his retirement in 1983. Additionally, Rickover founded the Research Science Institute (formerly the Rickover Science Institute) in 1984, a summer science program hosted by the Massachusetts Institute of Technology for high school seniors from around the world.

== General Dynamics scandal ==
In the early 1980s, structural welding flaws in submarines under construction were covered up by falsified inspection records, and the resulting scandal led to significant delays and expenses in the delivery of several submarines being built at the General Dynamics Electric Boat Division shipyard in Groton, Connecticut. The yard tried to pass on the vast cost overruns to the Navy, while Rickover demanded that the yard make good on its "shoddy" workmanship. The Navy settled with General Dynamics in 1981, paying out $634 million of $843 million in the Los Angeles-class submarine cost overrun and reconstruction claims. Secretary of the Navy John Lehman was partly motivated to seek the agreement in order to continue to focus on achieving President Reagan's goal of a 600-ship Navy. But Rickover was extremely bitter over the General Dynamics yard being paid hundreds of millions of dollars, and he lambasted both the settlement and Secretary Lehman. This was not Rickover's first clash with the defense industry; he was historically harsh in exacting high standards from defense contractors. It was later publicly announced by a former General Dynamics employee on 60 Minutes with Mike Wallace that Rickover was right that General Dynamics was lying to the Navy, but by then Rickover's public image was already damaged.

A Navy Ad Hoc Gratuities Board determined that Rickover had received gifts from General Dynamics over a 16-year period valued at $67,628, including jewelry, furniture, exotic knives, and gifts that Rickover had in turn presented to politicians. Charges were investigated that gifts were provided by General Electric and the Newport News Shipbuilding and Dry Dock, both major nuclear ship contractors for the Navy. Secretary Lehman admonished him in a non-punitive letter and stated that Rickover's "fall from grace with these little trinkets should be viewed in the context of his enormous contributions to the Navy." Rickover released a statement through his lawyer saying his "conscience is clear" with respect to the gifts. "No gratuity or favor ever affected any decision I made." Senator William Proxmire of Wisconsin, a longtime supporter of Rickover, later publicly associated a debilitating stroke suffered by the admiral to his having been censured and "dragged through the mud by the very institution to which he rendered his invaluable service."

== Forced retirement ==
By the late 1970s, Rickover's position seemed stronger than it had ever been. Over many years, powerful friends on both the House and Senate Armed Services Committees ensured that he remained on active duty long after most other admirals had retired from their second careers. Jimmy Carter's admiration for Rickover was shown by the fact that the title of Carter's autobiography was based on a question that Rickover had asked Carter when the latter was in the Navy ("Why Not The Best?"). However, Secretary of the Navy John Lehman felt that Rickover was hindering the well-being of the navy. As Lehman stated in his book, Command of the Seas:

One of my first orders of business as Secretary of the Navy would be to solve ... the Rickover problem. Rickover's legendary achievements were in the past. His present viselike grip on much of the navy was doing it much harm. I had sought the job because I believed the navy had deteriorated to the point where its weakness seriously threatened our future security. The navy's grave afflictions included loss of a strategic vision; loss of self-confidence, and morale; a prolonged starvation of resources, leaving vast shortfalls in capability to do the job; and too few ships to cover a sea so great, all resulting in cynicism, exhaustion, and an undercurrent of defeatism. The cult created by Admiral Rickover was itself a major obstacle to recovery, entwining nearly all the issues of culture and policy within the navy.

Secretary Lehman eventually attained enough political clout to enforce his decision to retire Rickover. This was in part assisted by the admiral's nearly insubordinate stance against paying the General Dynamics submarine construction claims, as well as his advanced age and waning political leverage. On 27 July 1981, Lehman was handed the final impetus for ending Rickover's career by way of an operational error on the admiral's part: a "moderate" loss of ship control and depth excursion while performing a submerged "crash back" maneuver during the sea trials of the newly constructed USS La Jolla. Rickover was the actual man-in-charge during this specific performance test, and his actions and inactions were judged to have been the causal factor. On 31 January 1982, five weeks after his 82nd birthday, Rickover was forced to retire from the Navy after 63 years of service under 13 presidents (Woodrow Wilson through Ronald Reagan). According to Rickover, he first learned of his firing when his wife told him what she heard on the radio.

According to Jimmy Carter, several weeks following his retirement, Rickover "was invited to the Oval Office and decided to don his full dress uniform. He told me that he refused to take a seat, listened to the president [Reagan] ask him to be his special nuclear advisor, replied 'Mr. President, that is bullshit,' and then walked out." The Navy's official investigation of General Dynamics' Electric Boat division was ended shortly afterward. According to Theodore Rockwell, Rickover's Technical Director for more than 15 years, more than one source at that time stated that General Dynamics officials were bragging around Washington that they had "gotten Rickover."

On 28 February 1983, a post-retirement party honoring Admiral Rickover was attended by all three living former U.S. Presidents at the time: Nixon, Ford, and Carter, all formerly officers in the U.S. Navy. President Reagan was not in attendance.

== Public image ==
Rickover has been called "the most famous and controversial admiral of his era." He was hyperactive, blunt, confrontational, insulting, and a workaholic, always demanding of others without regard for rank or position. Moreover, he had "little tolerance for mediocrity, none for stupidity." Even while a captain, Rickover did not conceal his opinions, and many of the officers whom he regarded as unintelligent eventually rose to be admirals and were assigned to the Pentagon. Rickover frequently found himself in bureaucratic combat with these senior naval officers, to the point that he almost missed becoming an admiral; two selection boards passed him over for promotion, and it took the intervention of the White House, U.S. Congress, and the Secretary of the Navy before he was promoted.

Rickover's military authority and congressional mandate were absolute with regard to the U.S. fleet's reactor operations, but his controlling personality was frequently a subject of internal Navy controversy. He was head of the Naval Reactors branch, and thus responsible for signing off on a crew's competence to operate the reactor safely, giving him the power to effectively remove a warship from active service, which he did on several occasions. The view became established that he sometimes exercised power to settle scores. Author and former submariner Edward L. Beach Jr. referred to him as a "tyrant" with "no account of his gradually failing powers" in his later years.

== Later life and death ==
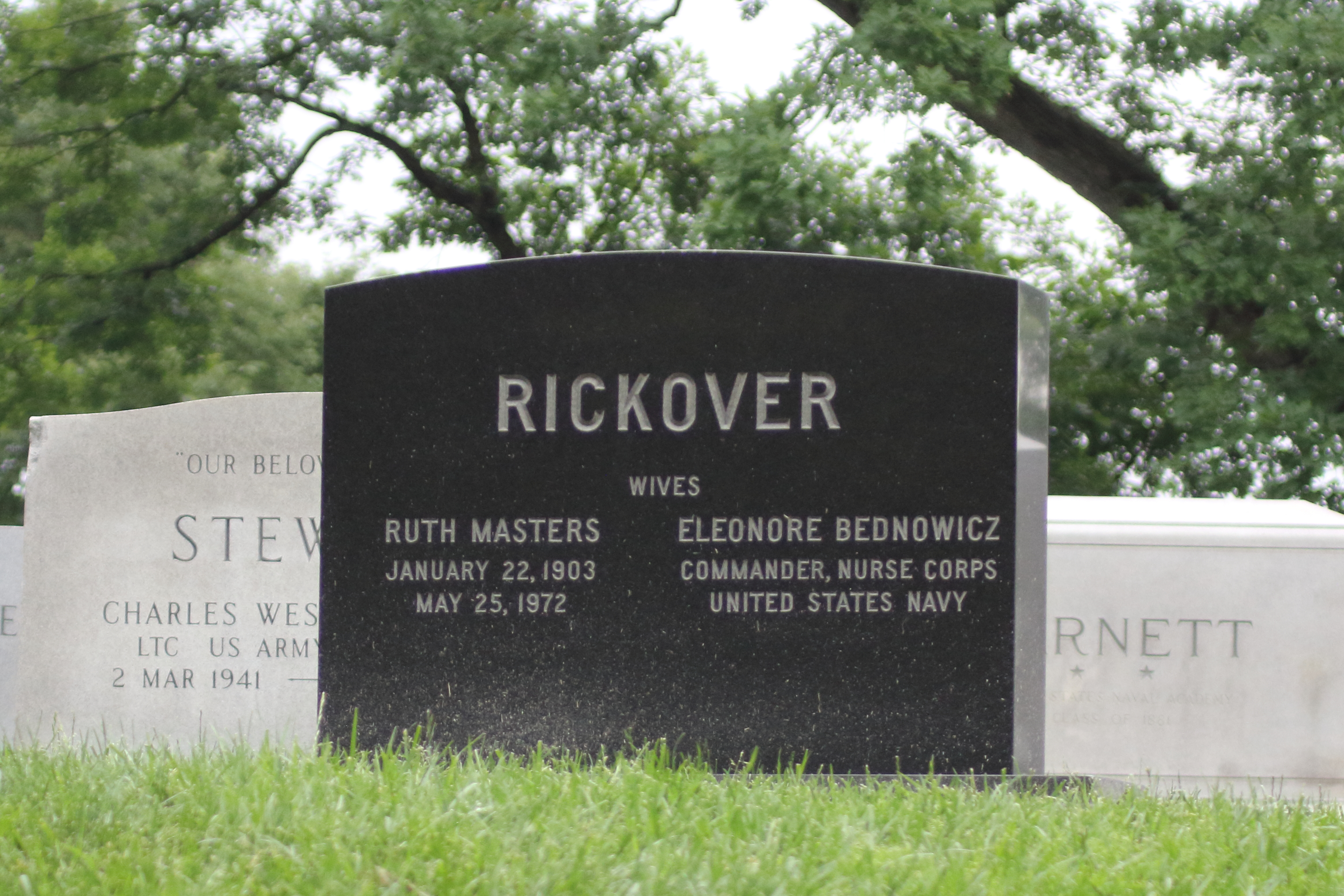
Headstone of Admiral Hyman G. Rickover, Arlington National Cemetery

On 4 July 1985, Admiral Rickover suffered what was described as a "serious" stroke, and was admitted to Bethesda Naval Hospital, thereafter dealing with partial paralysis in his right arm.

Rickover died at his home in Arlington, Virginia, on 8 July 1986, at age 86. He was buried on 11 July in a small, private ceremony at Arlington National Cemetery. On 14 July, memorial services were led by Admiral James D. Watkins at the Washington National Cathedral, with President Carter, Secretary of State George Shultz, Secretary Lehman, senior naval officers, and about 1,000 other people in attendance. At the request of the admiral's widow, President Carter read Milton's sonnet When I Consider How My Light is Spent.

Secretary of the Navy Lehman said in a statement:

With the death of Adm. Rickover, the Navy and this nation have lost a dedicated officer of historic accomplishment. In his 63 years of service, Adm. Rickover took the concept of nuclear power from an idea to the present reality of more than 150 U.S. naval ships under nuclear power, with a record of 3,000 ship-years of accident-free operations.

And the then-Chief of Naval Operations:

"Most important," Admiral Watkins said, "he was a teacher. He set the standards. They were tough. That is the legacy and the challenge he left to all who study his contributions."

Rickover is buried in Section 5 at Arlington National Cemetery. His first wife Ruth is buried with him and the name of his second wife Eleonore is inscribed on his gravestone. Eleonore died on 5 July 2021, and was buried in Arlington Cemetery. Rickover is survived by Robert Rickover, his sole son by his first wife.

== Personal life ==
While studying at Columbia University, Rickover met Ruth D. Masters, a graduate student in international law, whom he married in 1931 after she returned from her doctoral studies at the Sorbonne in Paris. They were married until Ruth's death in 1972, after which he married Eleonore A. Bednowicz. Hyman and Ruth Rickover had one son, Robert. Rickover's interfaith marriage caused a rift with his Orthodox Jewish parents. Rickover rarely saw his parents following his marriage, and they never met their daughter-in-law and grandson. However, he provided them financial support to get them through the Great Depression. Some biographers write that he converted to Episcopalianism and remained an Episcopalian for the rest of his life. His son Robert also believed that his father had converted, although he stated that his parents had no interest in Episcopalianism and he was sent to a Presbyterian church for confirmation, recalling that his parents considered it "a social thing" and that it was the only time his father ever came to church. According to author Marc Wortman, Rickover ceased to be a practicing Jew but did not convert and maintained an interest in Jewish life, donating all the proceeds from his books and speeches to a Jewish orphanage in Chicago. During a visit to Israel in 1982, Rickover expressed pride in his Jewish heritage.

== Honors ==
The Los Angeles-class submarine USS Hyman G. Rickover (SSN-709) was named for him. She was commissioned two years before his death, and was, at that time, one of only two Navy ships to be named after a living person since 1900 (there have been 16 more since). The submarine was launched on 27 August 1983, sponsored by his second wife Eleonore, commissioned on 21 July 1984, and deactivated on 14 December 2006. In 2015, the Navy announced a Virginia-class submarine named USS Hyman G. Rickover (SSN-795) in his honor. The submarine's christening took place on 31 July 2021.

Rickover Hall at the United States Naval Academy houses the departments of Mechanical Engineering, Naval Architecture, Ocean Engineering, and Aeronautical and Aerospace Engineering. Rickover Center at Naval Nuclear Power Training Command is located at Joint Base Charleston, where Navy personnel begin their engineering training. In 2011, the U.S. Navy Museum included Rickover as part of the Technology for the Nuclear Age: Nuclear Propulsion display for its Cold War exhibit, which featured the following quotation:

Good ideas are not adopted automatically. They must be driven into practice with courageous impatience.

Other things named in his honor include the Admiral Hyman Rickover Fellowship at M.I.T., Hyman G. Rickover Naval Academy, and Rickover Junior High School.

== Awards ==
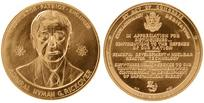
The second of two Congressional Gold Medals awarded to Rickover

=== Warfare insignia ===
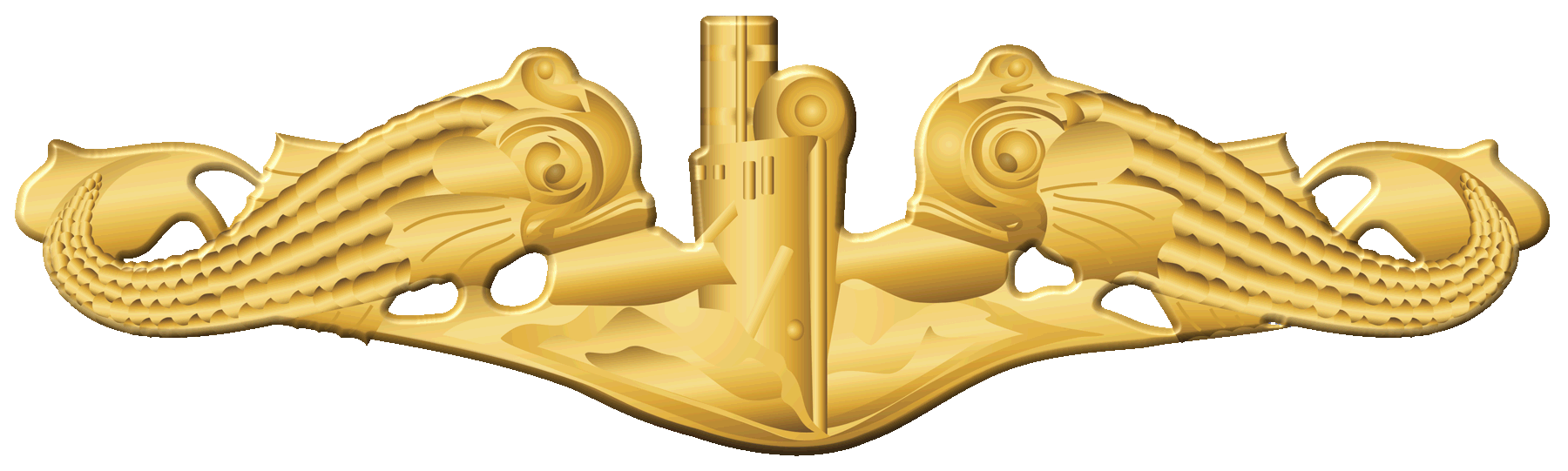
Submarine Warfare Insignia (Dolphins)

=== Decorations and medals ===
Navy Distinguished Service Medal with two 5/16″ Gold Stars (1961, 1964, 1982)
Legion Of Merit with 5/16″ Gold Star (1945, 1952)
Navy and Marine Corps Commendation Medal (1945)
Army Commendation Medal (1949) (Conversion award from Letter of Commendation from the Secretary of the Army in 1946.)
Presidential Medal of Freedom (1980)
World War I Victory Medal
China Service Medal
American Defense Service Medal
American Campaign Medal
Asiatic-Pacific Campaign Medal
World War II Victory Medal
Navy Occupation Service Medal with "ASIA" clasp
National Defense Service Medal with one 3/16″ Bronze Star

- Congressional Gold Medal – 2 awards (1958, 1982)

=== Foreign order ===
Honorary Commander of the Order of the British Empire (1946)

In recognition of his wartime service, he was invested as an Honorary Commander of the Military Division of the Most Excellent Order of the British Empire in 1946 by King George VI.

=== Other awards ===
Admiral Rickover was twice awarded the Congressional Gold Medal for exceptional public service; the first in 1958, and the second 25 years later in 1983, becoming one of only three persons to be awarded more than one. In 1980, President Jimmy Carter presented Admiral Rickover with the Presidential Medal of Freedom, the United States' highest non-military honor, for his contributions to world peace.

He also received 61 civilian awards and 15 honorary degrees, including the Enrico Fermi Award "For engineering and demonstrative leadership in the development of safe and reliable nuclear power and its successful application to our national security and economic needs." Some of the most notable other awards include:

- the Egleston Medal Award of Columbia University Engineering School Alumni Association (1955)
- the George Westinghouse Gold Medal from the American Society of Mechanical Engineers (ASME) (1955)
- the Michael I. Pupin 100th Anniversary Medal (1958)
- the Golden Omega Award from the Institute of Electrical and Electronics Engineers (IEEE) (1959)
- the Prometheus Award from the National Electrical Manufacturers Association (NEMA) (1965)
- the Newcomen Medal (1968)
- the Washington Award from the Western Society of Engineers (1970)

Some of his honorary degrees included:

- Sc.D.: Colby College (1954);
- Stevens Institute of Technology (1958);
- Columbia University (1960)

== Publications ==
=== Books ===
- Rickover, Hyman George (1959). Report on Russia. US GPO.
- Education and Freedom (1959). New York: Dutton
- Swiss Schools and Ours: Why Theirs Are Better (1962). Boston: Little, Brown and Company
- American Education (1963). New York: Dutton
- Liberty, Science, and Law (1969). New York: Newcomen Society
- Eminent Americans: Namesakes of the Polaris Submarine Fleet (1972). Washington, D.C.: United States Government Printing Office
- How the Battleship Maine Was Destroyed (1976). Washington, D.C.: Naval History Division

=== Reports ===
- Rickover, Hyman George (28 January 1982a). Economics of Defense Policy: Hearing before the Joint Economic Committee], Congress of the United States, 97th Cong., 2nd sess., Pt. 1 (PDF) (Report).

=== Speeches ===
- Rickover, Hyman George (14 May 1957). Energy resources and our future (Speech). Annual Scientific Assembly of the Minnesota State Medical Association. St. Paul, MN. Archived from the original on 3 May 2012.
- Rickover, Hyman George (10 February 1977). Thoughts on Man's Purpose in Life (Speech). Luncheon Meeting of the San Diego Rotary Club. San Diego, CA.
- Rickover, Hyman George (5 November 1981). Doing a Job (Speech). Columbia University School of Engineering: Validlab.com. Archived from the original on 26 February 2017. (Reprint Here)
- Rickover, Hyman George (12 May 1982). Thoughts on Man's Purpose in Life (Speech). Second Annual Morgenthau Memorial Lecture. Carnegie Council for Ethics in International Affairs. Archived (PDF) from the original on 10 July 2018.

== Documentaries ==
- "Admiral Rickover" – 60 Minutes interview by Diane Sawyer (1984) with an excerpt from a 1957 interview with Edward R. Murrow
- Rickover: The Birth of Nuclear Power by Michael Pack – documentary screened at the GI Film Festival in the District of Columbia on 24 May 2014, at the GI Film Festival, and broadcast on 9 December 2014 on PBS.

== See also ==
- American submarine NR-1
- Attack submarine § Later developments
- Jimmy Carter § Naval career
- Naval Nuclear Power School
- Operation Sandblast
- Robert McNamara as Secretary of Defense § Attack submarines
- Robert McNamara as Secretary of Defense § Naval aviation
- Y-12 National Security Complex
