= S1W reactor =

Naval reactor used by the United States Navy

The S1W reactor was the first prototype naval reactor used by the United States Navy to prove that the technology could be used for electricity generation and propulsion on submarines.

The designation of "S1W" stands for

- S = Submarine platform
- 1 = First generation core designed by the contractor
- W = Westinghouse was the contracted designer

and is a later Navy designation. During the plant's early years the project name was "Submarine Thermal Reactor" (STR)

The land-based nuclear reactor was built at the National Reactor Testing Station, later called Idaho National Engineering Laboratory near Arco, Idaho. The plant was the prototype for the power system of USS Nautilus (SSN-571), the world's first nuclear-powered submarine, which used the improved S2W reactor. The specific location within the vast Idaho National Laboratory where the S1W prototype was located was the Naval Reactors Facility.

== Design ==
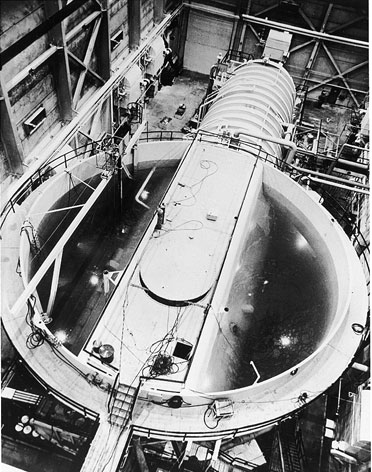
Nautilus's reactor core prototype at the S1W facility in Idaho

Under the leadership of Captain (later Admiral) Hyman G. Rickover, Naval Reactors followed a concurrent design strategy, with the design and construction of the S1W reactor taking place ahead of the design and construction of the Nautilus. This enabled problems to be identified and resolved before they appeared in the shipboard plant. To better support this design process, the S1W power plant was built inside of a submarine hull. While the cramped spaces prevented engineers from obtaining information on some plant components, it provided a much more realistic example of how the shipboard plant would have to be constructed.

== Operation ==
The S1W was a pressurized water reactor that utilized water as the coolant and neutron moderator in its primary system, and enriched Uranium-235 in its fuel elements. The S1W reactor reached criticality on March 30, 1953. In May of that year, it began power operations, performing a 100-hour run that simulated a submerged voyage from the east coast of the United States to Ireland. This test run clearly demonstrated the revolutionary impact that nuclear propulsion would have upon the submarine, which prior to that time was greatly limited in its ability to conduct continuous underwater operations by battery life and by the oxygen requirement of diesel propulsion systems.

The heated, pressurized water of the S1W reactor power plant was circulated through heat exchangers in order to generate high pressure saturated steam in a separate water loop. This saturated steam powered steam turbines for propulsion and generation of electricity. These facilities were constructed inside an elevated hull simulating the engineering portion of the Nautilus hull. A single propeller was simulated through use of a water brake. Large, exterior water spray ponds were used to dissipate the heat energy created in the facility into the air.

Following the commissioning of the USS Nautilus, the S1W plant was operated to support plant testing and training of operators. Trainees were graduates of the Naval Nuclear Power School in Bainbridge, MD, Mare Island, CA or Orlando, FL (all locations now closed). The course of study lasted six months and consisted of a combination of classroom and closely supervised practical training.

In the mid-1960s, the S1W core was removed. An extension was bolted to the top of the reactor vessel so that a larger S5W reactor core could be installed. After that time the prototype was called S1W/S5W core 4. The new core was first taken critical in late summer of 1967. In order to use the additional power generated by the S5W reactor, additional facilities were added in order to dump the excess steam when the plant was operated at higher power levels. These steam dumps were constructed in the same building, but outside the mock submarine hull.

The S1W/S5W plant was shut down permanently in 1989 (October 17).
