= Hanahan, South Carolina =

- City
- Seal
- Interactive map of Hanahan, South Carolina
- Location within the state of South Carolina Hanahan (the United States)
- Coordinates: 32°55′30″N 79°59′45″W
- Country: United States
- State: South Carolina
- County: Berkeley

Area
  - Total: 11.55 sq mi (29.91 km^{2})
  - Land: 10.52 sq mi (27.24 km^{2})
  - Water: 1.03 sq mi (2.66 km^{2})
- Elevation: 16 ft (4.9 m)

Population (2020)
  - Total: 20,325
  - Density: 1,932.3/sq mi (746.07/km^{2})
- Time zone: UTC−5 (Eastern (EST))
  - Summer (DST): UTC−4 (EDT)
- ZIP code: 29410
- Area codes: 843, 854
- FIPS code: 45-32065
- GNIS feature ID: 2403792
- Website: www.cityofhanahan.com

Hanahan is a city in Berkeley County, South Carolina, United States. As of the 2020 census, Hanahan had a population of 20,325. Portions of the Naval Weapons Station Charleston, including the Naval Consolidated Brig Charleston, are located in Hanahan. As defined by the U.S. Office of Management and Budget, and used by the U.S. Census Bureau for statistical purposes only, Hanahan is included within the Charleston-North Charleston-Summerville metropolitan area and the Charleston-North Charleston Urbanized Area.

== Geography ==
Hanahan is located at the very south end of Berkeley County, and its city limits on the west and south sides are contiguous with the county line between Berkeley and Charleston counties. It was incorporated as a city in 1973.

Hanahan is bordered on the west and south by the city of North Charleston. To the east is the old Naval Weapons Station, which was formerly a submarine base, and is still federal property. A very small portion of this federal base is actually in Hanahan's city limits. Among other uses of the former submarine base, the Naval Consolidated Brig is there, as is the Navy's Nuclear Power School. To the east and north is the city of Goose Creek, as well as unincorporated portions of Berkeley County.

CSX Transportation has a main north–south track that runs along Hanahan's west city limit. Hanahan is primarily a residential city. It does have quite a number of major warehouses in the northeast and southeast portions of the city, most of whose business is tied directly to the Port of Charleston, aeronautics, logistics and the defense industries. There are two commercial districts, one in the southernmost section of the city and another in Tanner Plantation. There has been some commercial development in the area known as Tanner Plantation, a primarily residential portion of the city which has developed over about the last 15 years. Hanahan's proximity to rail and major roadways make it an ideal place for cargo warehousing.

The Otranto Plantation was listed on the National Register of Historic Places in 1978.

According to the United States Census Bureau, the city has a total area of 11.5 square miles (29.8 km^{2}), of which 10.7 square miles (27.7 km^{2}) is land and 0.81 square miles (2.1 km^{2}), or 7.14%, is water.

== Demographics ==
Historical population
Census	Pop.	Note	%±
1980	13,224		—
1990	13,176		−0.4%
2000	12,937		−1.8%
2010	17,997		39.1%
2020	20,325		12.9%
2025 (est.)	22,415	▲	10.3%
U.S. Decennial Census

=== 2020 census ===
As of the 2020 census, Hanahan had a population of 20,325, 7,863 households, and 6,031 families residing in the city. The median age was 35.9 years. 25% of residents were under the age of 18 and 12.6% of residents were 65 years of age or older. For every 100 females there were 99.2 males, and for every 100 females age 18 and over there were 97.4 males age 18 and over.

99% of residents lived in urban areas, while 1% lived in rural areas.

Of those households, 35.9% had children under the age of 18 living in them. Of all households, 46% were married-couple households, 20.3% were households with a male householder and no spouse or partner present, and 26.9% were households with a female householder and no spouse or partner present. About 25.3% of all households were made up of individuals and 8.2% had someone living alone who was 65 years of age or older.

There were 8,366 housing units, of which 6% were vacant. The homeowner vacancy rate was 1.7% and the rental vacancy rate was 5.6%.

Racial composition as of the 2020 census
Race	Number	Percent
White	13,532	66.6%
Black or African American	2,441	12%
American Indian and Alaska Native	88	0.4%
Asian	877	4.3%
Native Hawaiian and Other Pacific Islander	22	0.1%
Some other race	1,649	8.1%
Two or more races	1,716	8.4%
Hispanic or Latino (of any race)	2,670	13.1%

=== 2000 census ===
In the census of 2000, there were 12,937 people (13,818 in 2005 estimate), 5,243 households, and 3,339 families residing in the city. The population density was 1,284.7 inhabitants per square mile (496.0/km^{2}). There were 5,698 housing units at an average density of 565.8 per square mile (218.5/km^{2}). The racial makeup of the city was 70.6% White, 17.7% African American, 0.4% Native American, 2% Asian, 0.1% Pacific Islander, 0.3% from other races, and 1.9% from two or more races. Hispanic or Latino of any race were 6.17% of the population.

There were 5,243 households, out of which 27.9% have youngsters under age 18 years living with them, 46.1% were married couples living together, 13.1% had a female householder with no husband present, and 36.3% were non-families. 27.7% of all households were made up of individuals, and 7.4% had someone living alone who was 65 years of age or older. The average household size was 2.34 and the average family size was 2.84.

In the city, the population was spread out, with 21% under the age of 18, 13.8% from 18 to 24, 31.5% from 25 to 44, 22.2% from 45 to 64, and 11.5% who were 65 years of age or older. The median age was 35 years. For every 100 females, there were 112.4 males. For every 100 females age 18 and over, there were 113 males.

The median income for a household in the city was $39,327, and the median income for a family was $45,246. Males had a median income of $30,354 versus $22,374 for females. The per capita income for the city was $22,629. About 6% of families and 17.4% of the population were below the poverty line, including 10.9% of those under age 18 and 6.2% of those age 65 or over.

== Government and infrastructure ==
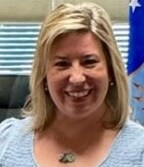
Christie Rainwater has served as Mayor since 2018.

The City of Hanahan is governed by a city council composed of the mayor and six council members. Together, they exercise the legislative authority of the municipal government. The council and mayor are elected by the voters. The mayor is a first among equals on the council, presiding over council meetings and representing the city at official functions. The council hires and fires department heads. The mayor and council members, though paid a small salary, are not full-time, but are citizens with other jobs. The mayor of Hanahan is Christie Rainwater. She has been in office since 2018.

The Hanahan Fire Department operates three (3) stations. Station 1, the Fire Department's headquarters, is conveniently located at 5826 Campbell St. Hanahan, SC 29410, next to Hanahan City Hall. Station 2 is located at 1200 S. Basilica Avenue, and Station 3 is located at 1101 Williams Lane. The department operates one rescue-engine company, one ladder (quint) company, one medic unit, and one battalion chief vehicle manned by the shift commander.

The Hanahan Police Department is organized into Administrative Services, Animal Control, Criminal Investigations, Uniform Patrol, Youth Services, and Victim Advocacy. The Patrol Division, the backbone of the Hanahan Police Department, comprises four squads. Each squad is led by a supervisor and an assistant supervisor, supported by a dedicated team of officers.

Portions of the Naval Weapons Station Charleston, including the Naval Consolidated Brig Charleston, are located in Hanahan.

== Armed Forces ==
Portions of The Charleston, South Carolina metropolitan area, (The City of Charleston, The City of North Charleston, The City of Goose Creek, and The City of Hanahan) are home to branches of the United States Military. During the Cold War, the Naval Base (1902–1996) became the third largest U.S. homeport serving over 80 ships and submarines. In addition, the Charleston Naval Shipyard repaired frigates, destroyers, cruisers, sub tenders, and submarines. The Shipyard was also equipped for the refueling of nuclear subs.

During this period, the Weapons Station was the Atlantic Fleet's load out base for all nuclear ballistic missile submarines. Two SSBN "Boomer" squadrons and a sub tender were homeported at the Weapons Station, while one SSN attack squadron, Submarine Squadron 4, and a sub tender were homeported at the Naval Base. At the 1996 closure of the Station's Polaris Missile Facility Atlantic (POMFLANT), over 2,500 nuclear warheads and their UGM-27 Polaris, UGM-73 Poseidon, and UGM-96 Trident I delivery missiles (SLBM) were stored and maintained, guarded by a U.S. Marine Corps Security Force Company.

In 2010, the Air Force Base (3,877 acres) and Naval Weapons Station (>17,000 acres) merged to form Joint Base Charleston. Today, Joint Base Charleston, encompassing over 20,877 acres and supporting 53 Military Commands and Federal Agencies, provides service to over 79,000 Airmen, Sailors, Soldiers, Marines, Coast Guardsmen, DOD civilians, dependents, and retirees.

=== Navy ===
- Naval Weapons Station, Joint Base Charleston (>17,000 acres, 27 square miles), Goose Creek and Hanahan
- Naval Information Warfare Center Atlantic (NAVWAR)
- Naval Nuclear Power Training Command
- Nuclear Power School
- Nuclear Power Training Unit
- Moored Training Nuclear Submarine, USS Daniel Webster (SSBN-626)
- Moored Training Nuclear Submarine, USS Sam Rayburn (SSBN-635)
- Moored Training Nuclear Submarine, USS La Jolla (SSN-701), After 2018 delivery
- Moored Training Nuclear Submarine, USS San Francisco (SSN-711), After 2019 delivery
- Naval Consolidated Brig, Charleston, East Coast
- Mobile Mine Assembly Unit Eleven (MOMAU-11)
- Naval Operations Support Center Charleston
- Navy Reserve Center
- Navy Munitions Command CONUS, Detachment Charleston
- Explosive Ordnance Detachment
- Naval Health Clinic Charleston
- Navy Dental Clinic
- Naval Criminal Investigative Service Training, Federal Complex
- Lay berth for Roll-On Roll-Off Naval Ships, Military Sealift Command, Federal Complex
- MV Cape Ducato (T-AKR-5051), Military Sealift Command Ship, Ready Reserve Force, Federal Complex
- MV Cape Douglas (T-AKR-5052), Military Sealift Command Ship, Ready Reserve Force, Federal Complex
- MV Cape Domingo (T-AKR-5053), Military Sealift Command Ship, Ready Reserve Force, Federal Complex
- MV Cape Decision (T-AKR-5054), Military Sealift Command Ship, Ready Reserve Force, Federal Complex
- MV Cape Diamond (T-AKR-5055), Military Sealift Command Ship, Ready Reserve Force, Federal Complex
- MV Cape Edmont (T-AKR-5069), Military Sealift Command Ship, Ready Reserve Force, Federal Complex

=== Air Force ===
- Charleston Air Force Base, Joint Base Charleston (3,877 acres, 66 square miles), North Charleston
- Charleston Air Force Auxiliary Base, North, SC (2,393 acres, 3.74 square miles)
- Charleston Defense Fuel Storage and Distribution Facility, Hanahan
- 628th Air Base Wing
- 628th Mission Support Group
- 628th Medical Group
- 315th Airlift Wing
- 437th Airlift Wing
- 373rd Training Squadron, Detachment 5
- 1st Combat Camera Squadron
- 412th Logistics Support Squadron OL-AC
- Air Force ROTC Det 772
- Civil Air Patrol – Charleston Composite Squadron

=== Marines ===
- Marine Corps Reserve Center, Naval Weapons Station

=== Coast Guard ===
- Coast Guard Sector Charleston (District 7)
- Coast Guard Station Charleston
- Coast Guard Helicopter Air Facility, Johns Island
- Coast Guard Eurocopter HH-65 Dolphin, Johns Island
- Coast Guard Reserves, Charleston
- Coast Guard Maritime Law Enforcement Academy, Federal Complex
- USCGC Hamilton (WMSL-753) National Security Cutter, Federal Complex
- USCGC James (WMSL-754) National Security Cutter, Federal Complex
- USCGC Stone (WMSL-758) National Security Cutter, 2021 Delivery, Federal Complex
- USCGC Tarpon, Marine Protector-class coastal patrol boat, Tybee Island
- USCGC Yellowfin, Marine Protector-class coastal patrol boat, Charleston
- USCGC Anvil, Charleston

=== Army ===
- United States Army Corps of Engineers, Charleston District
- South Carolina Army National Guard
- Army Reserve Training Center, Naval Weapons Station
- 841st Army Transportation Battalion, Naval Weapons Station
- 1182nd Army Deployment & Distribution Support Battalion, Naval Weapons Station
- 1189th Army Transportation Brigade, Reserve Support Command, Naval Weapons Station
- Army Strategic Logistics Activity, Naval Weapons Station

=== Federal Complex (former Charleston Naval Base), North Charleston ===
- Federal Law Enforcement Training Centers (FLETC), Department of Homeland Security
- Moored FLETC Training Ship, SS Cape Chalmers (T-AK-5036)
- Sea Hawk Interagency Operations Center
- Customs and Border Protection Satellite Academy
- Immigration and Customs Enforcement Satellite Academy
- U.S. Courts, Federal Probation and Pretrial Services Academy
- Food and Drug Administration Training Academy
- National Oceanic and Atmospheric Administration (NOAA)
- NOAAS Nancy Foster (R 352) Ship
- NOAAS Ronald H. Brown (R 104) Ship
- U.S. Department of State
- Global Financial Services Center, U.S. Department of State
- Passport Service Center, U.S. Department of State
- United States Maritime Administration
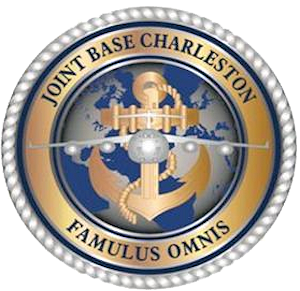
Joint Base Charleston

United States Marine Corps

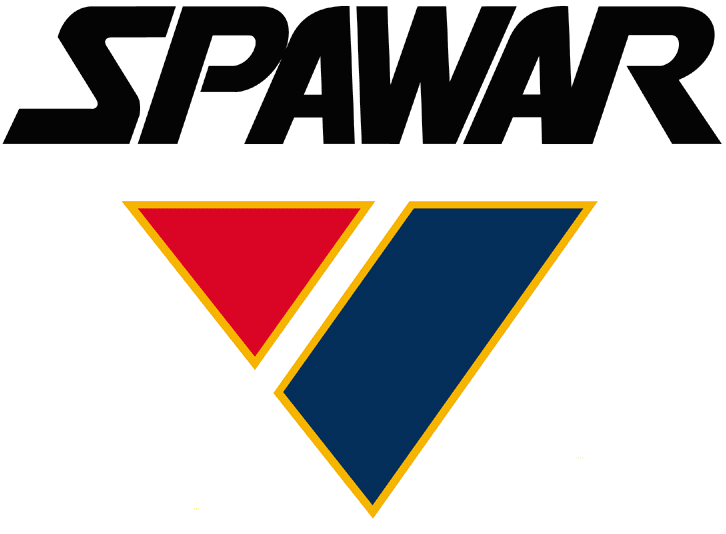
SPAWAR Systems Center Atlantic

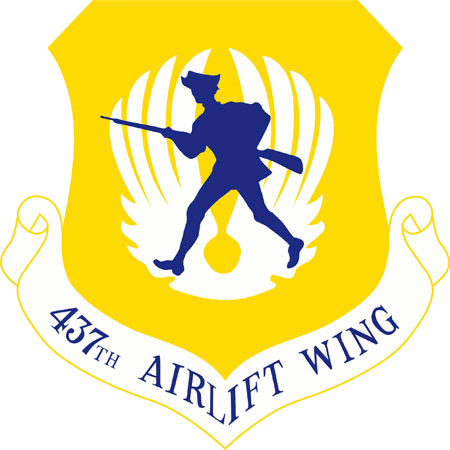
The 437 Airlift Wing

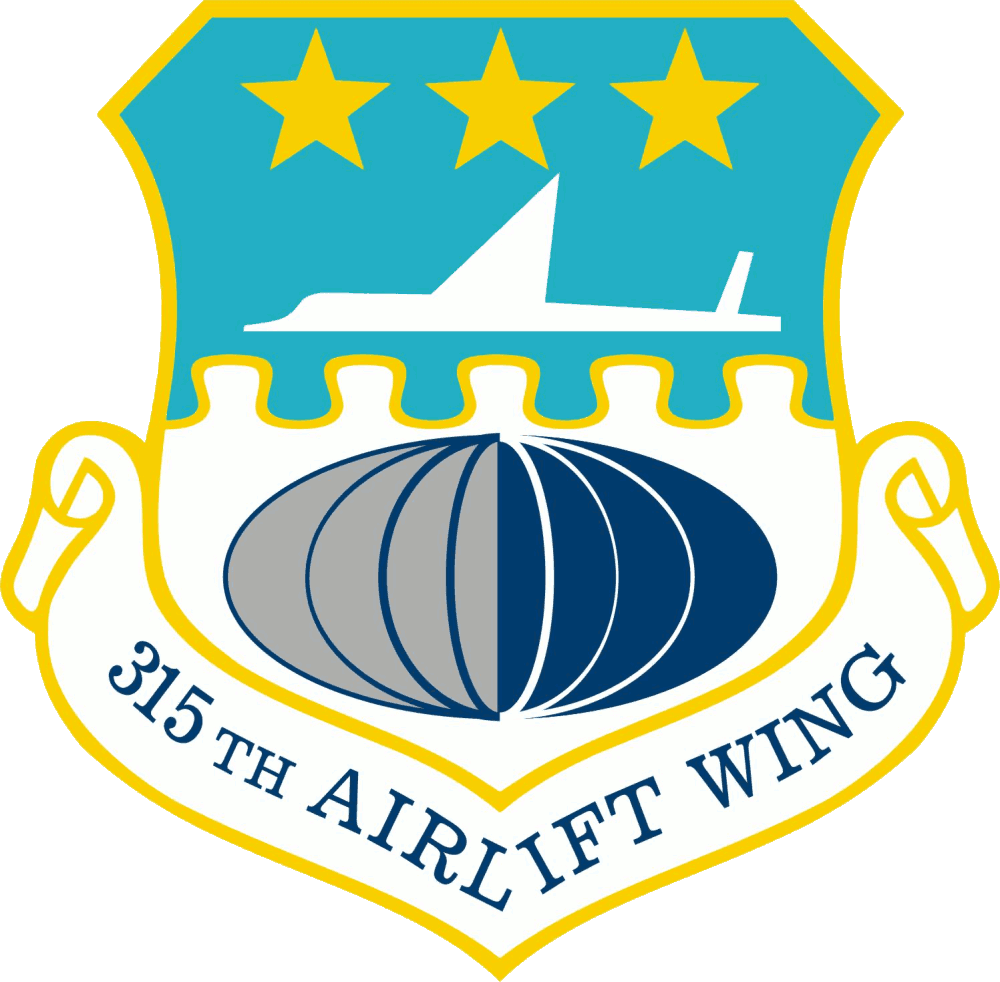
The 315 Airlift Wing

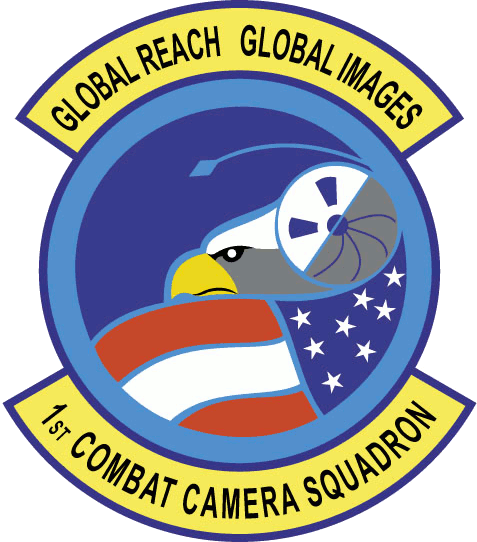
The 1st Combat Camera Squadron

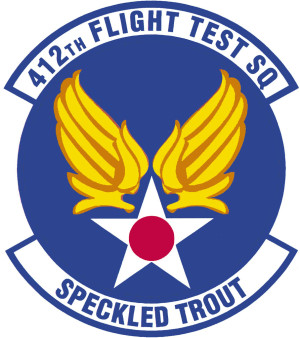
The 412 Flight Test Squadron

U.S. Army Corps of Engineers

== Education ==
Hanahan has four public schools for school aged children: Hanahan Elementary and Bowens Corner Elementary, Hanahan Middle, and Hanahan High. Hanahan Elementary and Hanahan Middle School were both awarded National Blue Ribbon Award status by the U.S. Department of Education in 2014. Out of 5 schools in the entire state, Hanahan has two of them. Both the 9- and 11-year-old girls team won the Dixie Ponytails World Series Softball Championship in 2013 as well as the Dixie Angles World Series Softball Championship.

Hanahan has a public library, a branch of the Berkeley County Library System.

== Arts and culture ==
Yeamans Hall Club is located in Hanahan. Yeamans is ranked the #2 private course in the State of South Carolina and was built in 1925.

Fishing and water sports are a large part of life in Hanahan. With several neighborhoods that have tidal water behind them, Hanahan has direct access to the Cooper River and the Charleston Harbor. Fishing is a very popular thing to do in Hanahan. The Goose Creek Reservoir is located in the middle of Hanahan. The Reservoir contains a wide range of fish species and hosts several tournaments per year.

Opened in 2013, the Hanahan Amphitheater is an outdoor community theater that hosts city run events, movies in the park and concerts. The Amphitheater is complete with concessions, setup for professional audio/video events and host weddings and other community events.

== Notable person ==
- Tim Scott, U.S. senator; former U.S. congressman, state senator, and Charleston County Council member
