= MTS =

MTS, Mts or mts may refer to:

== Organizations ==
- Machine and tractor station, Soviet state-owned enterprise
- Manitoba Teachers' Society, Canada, founded 1919
- Marine Technology Society, professional society
- Marine Transportation Services, northern Canadian shipping company
- Marion Transit System, a bus service in Marion, Indiana
- Māori Television Service, a New Zealand organisation
- Merchant Taylors' School (disambiguation), several schools
- Metcash (stock exchange code), Australian distribution company
- Metro Transport Sydney, Australia, former Sydney light rail and monorail owner until 2013
- Metro Trains Sydney, Australia, operator of the Sydney Metro Northwest line since 2019
- Millennium Transit Services, a 2003–2009 US bus builder
- Mitchelton–Scott, a professional cycling team that competes on the UCI World Tour
- MTS Entertainment, a television syndication unit of Mattel
- MTS Systems Corporation, test system supplier
- Muckleshoot Tribal Schools
- San Diego Metropolitan Transit System, since 1886

=== Telecommunications ===
- Bell MTS, a telecommunications provider in Manitoba, Canada formerly known as Manitoba Telephone System and Manitoba Telecom Services
- Mts (Telekom Srbija), a telecommunications company in Serbia
- MTS (network provider), a Russian telecommunications company
  - MTS India, Indian subsidiary of MTS
  - MTS Ukraine, former name of Vodafone Ukraine, a Ukrainian subsidiary of MTS
  - MTS Turkmenistan

== Science and technology ==
- Metre–tonne–second system of units, a system of physical units
- Metrical task system, mathematical objects used in the context of online algorithms
- MIDI Tuning Standard, a specification of precise musical pitch
- Mobile Telephone Service, early mobile telephone standard
- Movement Tracking System, US battlefield asset-tracking system
- Multichannel television sound, encoding several sound channels onto a single carrier

=== Computing ===
- .mts, file format for multiplexed audio, video and other streams
- Michigan Terminal System, a mainframe operating system
- Microsoft Transaction Server, software
- MT/s, megatransfers per second
- MPEG transport stream, a digital media container format

=== Biology and medicine ===
- Malaysian trumpet snail
- Mesial temporal sclerosis, pattern of hippocampal neuron cell loss
- Mohr–Tranebjærg syndrome, also known as deafness–dystonia syndrome
- MTS assay, a biochemical cell assay used in research
- Muir–Torre syndrome, a cancer syndrome

== Other uses ==
- Make to stock, build-ahead production approach
- Master of Theological Studies, a graduate degree
- Matsapha Airport (IATA code MTS), a former airport in Eswatini
- Megan Thee Stallion, an American rapper, singer, and songwriter
- Moored training ship, a United States Navy Nuclear Power School training ship
- Mountains, abbreviated as Mts in geographic names

== See also ==
- MTSS (disambiguation)
