= USS San Francisco =

Three vessels of the United States Navy have been named USS San Francisco, after the city of San Francisco, California.

- The first USS San Francisco (C-5) was a protected cruiser commissioned in 1890, converted to a minelayer in 1908, and decommissioned in 1921.
- The second USS San Francisco (CA-38) was a heavy cruiser commissioned in 1934, active throughout the Pacific War, and decommissioned in 1946.
- The third USS San Francisco (SSN-711) is a Los Angeles-class nuclear attack submarine commissioned in 1981 and taken out of active service in 2017.
- The fourth USS San Francisco (SSN-810) is a planned Virginia-class nuclear attack submarine, announced in 2023.

== See also ==
- USNS Mission San Francisco (T-AO-123) was an oiler that served in the U.S. Navy from 1947 to 1957.
