= USS San Francisco (SSGN-810) =

US Navy Virginia-class submarine

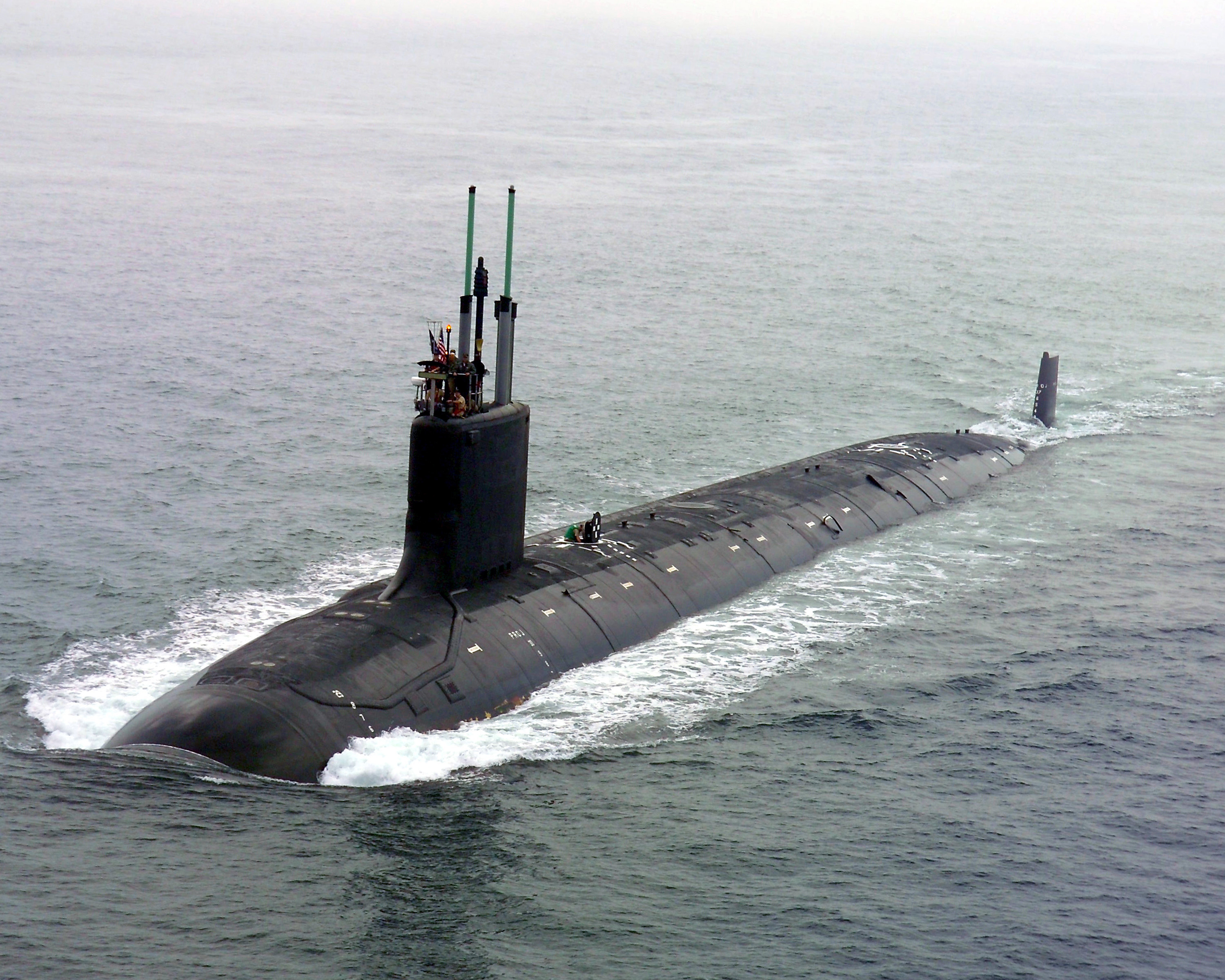
- The lead boat of the Virginia class, USS Virginia (SSN-774)

History

United States
- Name: San Francisco
- Namesake: San Francisco, California
- Builder: General Dynamics Electric Boat
- Identification: SSGN-810
- Status: Announced

General characteristics
- Class & type: Virginia-class submarine
- Displacement: 10,200 tons
- Length: 460 ft (140 m)
- Beam: 34 ft (10.4 m)
- Draft: 32 ft (9.8 m)
- Propulsion: S9G reactor, auxiliary diesel engine
- Speed: 25 knots (46 km/h)
- Endurance: can remain submerged for more than 3 months
- Test depth: greater than 800 ft (244 m)
- Complement: 15 officers; 120 enlisted crew
- Armament: 40 VLS tubes (12 forward VPT; 28 in VPM), four 21 inch (530 mm) torpedo tubes for Mk-48 torpedoes BGM-109 Tomahawk

USS San Francisco (SSGN-810) will be a Virginia-class nuclear-powered attack submarine of the United States Navy, the ninth of the Block V boats and the 37th overall of her class. She will be the fourth US naval vessel named for San Francisco, California, one of the most densely populated cities in the U.S. The first San Francisco (C-5) was a nineteenth-century cruiser, later converted to a mine-layer, that saw action during the Spanish-American War and World War I, while the second (CA-38) was a heavy cruiser and one of the most decorated ships of World War II. The third, (SSN-711), also an attack submarine, is a Los Angeles-class boat that after decommissioning, became a moored training ship for the Nuclear Power School in South Carolina.

The submarine's name was announced on 3 October 2023 by Navy Secretary Carlos Del Toro while attending Fleet Week in San Francisco.

== Design ==
Compared to Blocks I-IV of Virginia-class submarines, Block V vessels will incorporate previously introduced modifications to the base design in addition to a Virginia Payload Module (VPM). The VPM inserts a segment into the boat's hull which adds four vertical launch tubes. Each tube allows for the carrying of seven Tomahawk strike missiles, increasing her armament to a total of 40 missiles.
