= United States Navy Nuclear Propulsion =

Community to maintain U.S. Navy nuclear reactors

The United States Navy Nuclear Propulsion community consists of naval officers and enlisted members who are specially trained to run and maintain the nuclear reactors that power the submarines and aircraft carriers of the United States Navy. Operating more than 80 nuclear-powered ships, the United States Navy is currently the largest naval force in the world.

== History ==
The United States Navy first began research into the applications of nuclear power in 1946 at the Manhattan Project's nuclear power-focused laboratory to develop a nuclear power plant. Eight men were assigned to the project, including Admiral Hyman G. Rickover, who is known as the "Father of the Nuclear Navy."

=== Submarines ===
The first nuclear-powered submarine, USS Nautilus (SSN-571), was launched and commissioned in 1954. The development of the nuclear-powered submarine greatly increased capabilities; the duration a sub could remain underwater was now limited only by food supply. By using power generated from the reactor, air was able to be continually recycled, and water was able to be distilled from seawater. The nuclear-powered sub could also reach and maintain much higher speeds than its predecessors.

Shortly after USS Nautilus, USS Seawolf was commissioned. The reactor engine in USS Seawolf was a liquid metal-cooled (sodium) reactor. This proved to be more difficult to maintain and was eventually replaced with a pressurized water reactor, the same design used in USS Nautilus.

The first production run of nuclear submarines was the Skate class, which was followed by the Skipjack class. The Skipjack was designed with a more advanced teardrop hull that provided greater hydrodynamics, which allowed the submarines to achieve higher speeds while producing less noise.

The United States Navy operates four different classes of submarine: the Los Angeles, Ohio, Seawolf and Virginia classes.

The United States has a total of 70 submarines on active duty as of 2018. All are nuclear-powered. There are 18 Ohio class, 14 Virginia class, 3 Seawolf class and 35 Los Angeles class.

=== Aircraft carriers ===
Shortly to follow in utilizing nuclear technology was the aircraft carrier. Commissioned in 1961, USS Enterprise was the first nuclear-powered aircraft carrier.

The first production class of nuclear-powered aircraft carrier is the Nimitz class. Ten Nimitz-class aircraft carriers in total were produced with all remaining in active duty. This class of aircraft carrier is currently intended to be replaced with the Gerald R. Ford class. The Gerald R. Ford-class aircraft carriers are currently in production, with three vessels constructed to date. There are plans to produce an additional seven vessels.

The United States has a total of 11 nuclear-powered aircraft carriers and controls the largest carrier fleet in the world.

=== Cruisers ===
For almost 40 years, the U.S. Navy had nuclear-powered cruisers as a part of its fleet, beginning in 1961 with the commissioning of USS Long Beach (CGN-9) and ending in 1998 with the decommissioning of USS Arkansas (CGN-41). The Navy had a total nine nuclear cruisers spread across five different classes. The Navy found they were too costly to maintain and eventually stopped producing them. Long Beach was equipped with a C1W cruiser reactor while the other eight ships were equipped with D2G destroyer reactors.

=== Battleships ===
A proposed ship to be included in the U.S. Navy's fleet of nuclear capable ships is the Trump-class battleship. During the release of the U.S. Navy's shipbuilding plan for the FY27–FY31, it was outlined the class is to include nuclear power.

== Nuclear equipment ==
=== Power generation ===
All of the Navy's submarines and aircraft carriers are propelled by nuclear power. In order for this to happen, each ship essentially contains a small nuclear power plant. The power generated by this reactor is created through nuclear fission. During the process of nuclear fission, there are two products of significant importance in the reactor: heat and radiation. The heat is generated from the breaking down of the fuel source (uranium). Uranium creates heat through a self-sustaining reaction as it is bombarded by free neutrons created during fission and then reabsorbed to continue the reaction. The heat generated from the reaction heats water in the steam generator. Due to the pressurization of the system, the water that cools the reactor does not boil, but creates a media to transfer the heat to the steam plants to create steam. As steam is produced, it is forced through a series of pipes and past different turbines, causing the turbine to spin and generate electrical power or propel the ship. The steam is then cooled and converted back to water, which is then sent back to the steam generator and the process is repeated.

=== Environmental impact ===
Nuclear reactors create energy through fission, as opposed to burning fuel. Because of this, no greenhouse gases are produced in the energy creation process. Nuclear energy is completely self-contained and produces no airborne by-products. The waste created through nuclear power is contained in the reactor and is disposed of when the vessel is decommissioned or the reactor is replaced.

Unlike nuclear power plants that have to have spent fuel rods removed from their reactors every 18 to 24 months, the nuclear reactors powering the submarines and aircraft carriers of the United States Navy remain fully operational until they are decommissioned. When the reactors powering the ships of the Navy are decommissioned, all the nuclear waste is disposed of at once.

=== Safety record ===
As of 2003, and since the first U.S. nuclear-powered submarine (USS Nautilus), the United States Navy had logged over 6,200 "reactor years" with no radiological accidents.

However, on 22 May 1978 on USS Puffer, a valve was mistakenly opened releasing up to 100 US gallons (380 L) of radioactive water into a drydock at Puget Sound naval base. The leak was fully contained and there was no personnel irradiation.

== Nuclear propulsion career types ==
In order to safely operate the fleet of nuclear-powered vessels, the U.S. Navy recruits and trains the men and women who serve in the Navy Nuclear Propulsion community.

There are careers for officers, requiring a minimum of a college degree, and there are Enlisted careers requiring a minimum of a high school diploma or equivalent.

=== Officers ===
Because of the rigorous training that Navy nuclear officers undergo, only a select group of individuals are given the opportunity to lead a crew and command this technologically advanced equipment. Careers as an officer in Navy Nuclear Propulsion include:

==== Submarine officers ====
They oversee the day-to-day operations on board a submarine. They ensure that all systems run smoothly, including the nuclear reactor and nuclear propulsion system, weapons systems, and atmosphere control and fire control systems. They are also responsible for driving the vessel and charting its position and operating communications and intelligence equipment.

==== Surface warfare officers (nuclear) ====
Nuclear Surface Warfare Officers oversee the day-to-day operations of a nuclear-powered aircraft carrier and conventional war ships, managing everything from communications and navigation to armament capabilities and tactical deployment. Nuclear Surface Warfare Officers are in charge of numerous shipboard operations and activities, from the engineering plant to the bridge. They have the responsibility of ensuring that sailors in their division maintain and operate the ship's complex systems.

==== Naval reactors engineers ====
Naval Reactors (NR) is a government office that has responsibility for all shipboard nuclear power plants, shore-based prototypes and nuclear propulsion support facilities for the Navy. Naval Reactors Engineers assume responsibility for key technical work in a variety of facilities, including:

- Two Department of Energy laboratories
- Two nuclear prototype/training sites
- Nearly 100 nuclear-powered ships and submarines
- Six shipyards
- More than 1,000 firms that support the Naval Reactors program

==== Naval Nuclear Power School instructors ====
Naval Nuclear Power School Instructors train the future Navy Nuclear community through a technologically advanced curriculum that is designed to prepare Navy Enlisted Sailors and Officers attending Nuclear Power School for their work in the nuclear power field. They provide detailed knowledge of how to operate the key aspects of a pressurized-water Navy nuclear power plant, which include:

- Reactor core nuclear principles
- Heat transfer and fluid systems
- Plant chemistry and materials
- Mechanical and electrical systems
- Radiological control

==== Nuclear Power Training Unit Instructors ====
Nuclear Power Training Unit (NPTU) Instructors operate and teach at one of the moored training ships as part of the final stage of nuclear training for officers and enlisted nuclear operators.

==== Navy Nuclear Propulsion Officer Candidate (NUPOC) Program ====
For current undergraduate students who meet the high academic standards and prerequisite background, especially those pursuing majors such as mathematics, engineering, physics or chemistry, the NUPOC program provides money to eligible candidates to complete their undergraduate or graduate degree as well as a regular monthly income while in school. The pay amount varies based on location, but is usually in the range of $4000–5500 per month. There is also a one-time $15,000 bonus for getting accepted for Submarine, Surface, and Naval Reactors Engineer positions. After obtaining their degree, individuals earn a commission in the Navy and pursue one of the Officer career paths in Navy Nuclear Propulsion.

While in NUPOC, students have no special uniforms, classes, or obligations day-to-day. They must, however, refrain from drug use and pass a physical fitness test every six months. Students in NUPOC are considered "Active Duty" and paid at the E-6 or E-7 paygrade. As such, time spent completing a degree accrues for purposes of Naval Retirement and VA benefits such as the Post-9/11 GI Bill.

==== Basic qualifications ====
The NUPOC program is open to both men and women. Depending on career focus, the eligibility requirements have minor variances. There are criteria that one must meet regardless of the focus. Candidates must:

- Be a U.S. citizen
- Meet the physical standards of the Navy
- Have a minimum age of 19

- Submarine Officers/Surface Warfare Officers must be less than 31 years of age
- Naval Reactors Engineers/Nuclear Power School Instructors must be less than 35 years of age

Education: Candidates must be graduates or students of an accredited college or university in the United States or a United States territory holding or pursuing a BA, BS or MS (preferably majoring in mathematics, engineering, physics, chemistry or another technical area) and must have:

- Completed one academic year of calculus
- Completed one academic year of calculus-based physics
- Have a competitive GPA (Depending on the desired career, minimum grade requirements exist for all technical courses)

=== Enlisted ===
Members of the Navy Nuclear community operate, control and maintain the components that power Navy aircraft carriers and submarines. This could involve doing anything from operating nuclear propulsion plant machinery to controlling auxiliary equipment that supports Naval reactors to maintaining the electronic equipment used to send and receive messages, detect enemy planes and ships, and determine target distances.

Machinist's Mates (MM) operate and maintain steam turbines and reduction gears used for ship propulsion and auxiliary machinery such as turbogenerators, pumps and oil purifiers. They also maintain auxiliary machinery outside of main machinery spaces, such as electrohydraulic steering engines and elevators, refrigeration plants, air conditioning systems and desalinization plants. They may also operate and maintain compressed gas-producing plants. Nuclear-trained Enlisted Sailors perform duties in nuclear propulsion plants operating reactor controls and propulsion and power generation systems.

Electrician's Mates (EM) are responsible for the operation of a ship's electrical power generation systems, lighting systems, electrical equipment and electrical appliances. The duties include installation, operation, adjustment, routine maintenance, inspection, test and repair of electrical equipment. EMs also perform maintenance and repair of related electronic equipment.

Electronics Technicians (ET) in the nuclear field are normally assigned to Reactor Control division. They are responsible for maintenance, repair and operation of equipment that is closely related to the nuclear reactor and reactor safety.

==== Qualifications ====
To be eligible for any Nuclear Operations career, a candidate must first be selected for nuclear training by scoring above the minimum requirements on the Armed Services Vocational Aptitude Battery (ASVAB) and must:

- Be a U.S. citizen
- Be less than 25 years of age at the time of enlistment
- Be able to meet the physical standards of the Navy
- Be a high school graduate with a diploma and successful completion of one year of algebra
- Be able to meet security clearance requirements
