= USS Sam Rayburn =

James Madison-class fleet ballistic missile submarine

Coordinates: 32.945194°N 79.929076°W

USS Sam Rayburn (SSBN-635)
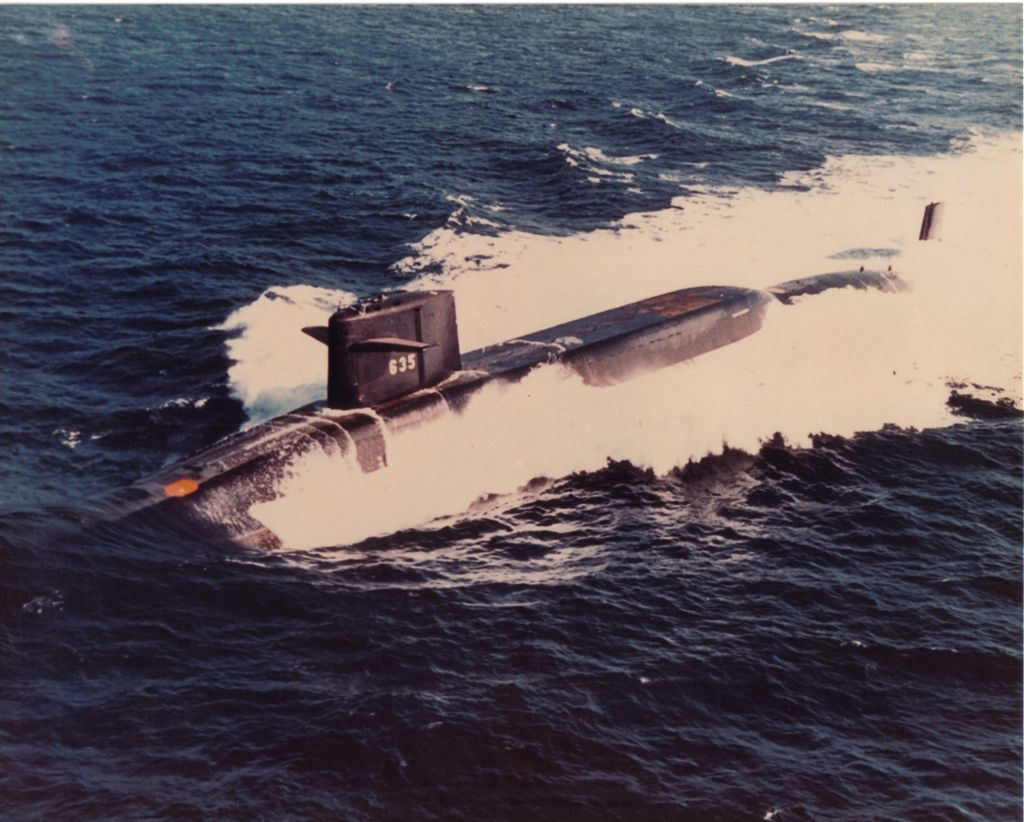
- USS Sam Rayburn (SSBN-635) off the United States East Coast, probably while on sea trials in 1964.

History

United States
- Namesake: Sam Rayburn (1882–1961), Speaker of the United States House of Representatives (1940–1947, 1949–1953, and 1955–1961)
- Ordered: 20 July 1961
- Builder: Newport News Shipbuilding and Dry Dock Company, Newport News, Virginia
- Laid down: 3 December 1962
- Launched: 20 December 1963
- Sponsored by: Mrs. S. E. Bartley and Mrs. W. A. Thomas
- Commissioned: 2 December 1964
- Decommissioned: 31 July 1989
- Reclassified: Moored training ship, MTS-635, 31 July 1989
- Stricken: 31 July 1989
- Motto: "First in its Class"
- Nickname(s): Mr Sam
- Status: Awaiting defueling and disposal at Norfolk Naval Shipyard.

General characteristics
- Class & type: James Madison-class submarine
- Displacement: 6,700 long tons (6,808 t) light
- Length: 425 ft (130 m)
- Beam: 33 ft (10 m)
- Draft: 32 ft (9.8 m)
- Installed power: S5W reactor
- Propulsion: 2 × geared steam turbines, one shaft 15,000 shp (11,185 kW)
- Speed: Over 20 knots (37 km/h; 23 mph)
- Test depth: 1,300 feet (400 m)
- Complement: Two crews (Blue and Gold) of 120 men each
- Armament: 16 × ballistic missile tubes; 4 × 21 in (533 mm) torpedo tubes (all forward)

USS Sam Rayburn (SSBN-635) was a James Madison-class fleet ballistic missile submarine named for Sam Rayburn (1882–1961), Speaker of the United States House of Representatives (1940–1947, 1949–1953, and 1955–1961). Sam Rayburn was in commission 2 December 1964 to 31 July 1989 carrying the Polaris missile and later the Poseidon missile. Following decommissioning, ex-Sam Rayburn was converted into a moored training ship for use at the Naval Nuclear Power Training Unit at Goose Creek, South Carolina.

== Construction and commissioning ==
The contract to build Sam Rayburn was awarded to Newport News Shipbuilding and Dry Dock Company in Newport News, Virginia on 20 July 1961 and her keel was laid down there on 3 December 1962. She was launched on 20 December 1963, sponsored by Mrs. S. E. Bartley and Mrs. W. A. Thomas, and commissioned on 2 December 1964, with Captain Oliver H. Perry, Jr., in command of the Blue Crew and Commander William A. Williams III in command of the Gold Crew.

== Service history ==
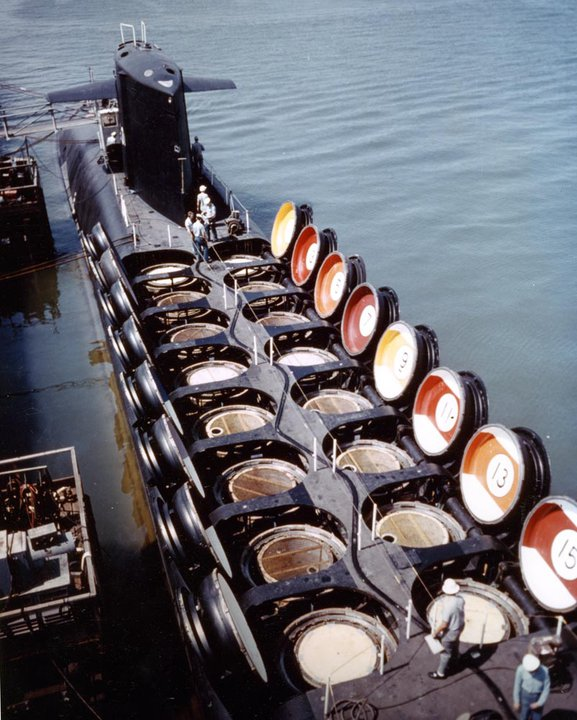
Sam Rayburn c. 1964, with her missile hatches showing their "billiard ball" livery

Sam Rayburn conducted demonstration and shakedown operations on the Atlantic Missile Range, first operated by her Blue Crew and then by her Gold Crew. She joined Submarine Squadron 18 at Charleston, South Carolina, before her first Polaris ballistic missile deterrent patrol in the summer of 1965. In August 1965, she joined Submarine Squadron 16 and made seven deterrent patrols out of Rota, Spain, before rejoining Submarine Squadron 18 at Charleston in December 1966. During 1967, Sam Rayburn completed her 8th through 11th deterrent patrols. During 1968, she completed her 12th through 14th deterrent patrols.

During 1969, Sam Rayburn operated continuously with Submarine Squadron 18 until commencing overhaul at Portsmouth Naval Shipyard at Kittery, Maine, in December 1969. Upon completion of overhaul on 27 May 1971, she operated along the United States East Coast for the remainder of 1971 and into 1972.

In 1972, Sam Rayburn departed Groton, Connecticut, and arrived at Charleston before departing Charleston on an extended period of special operations. In June 1974, she remained engaged in those special operations.

== Deactivation, decommissioning, and disposal ==
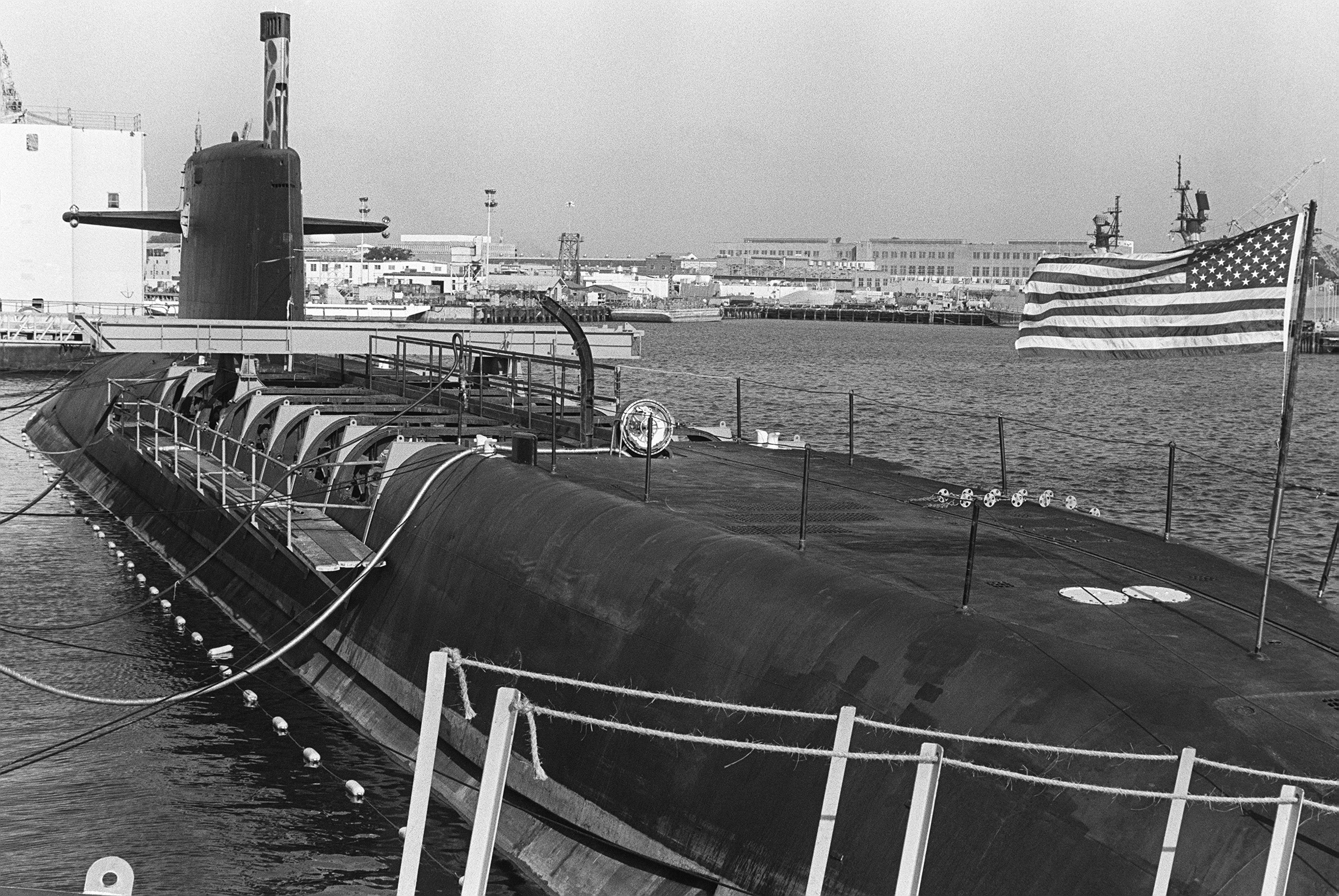
Sam Rayburn being dismantled prior to her 31 July 1989 decommissioning.

On 10 June 1985, the U.S. Navy announced plans to dismantle a fleet ballistic missile submarine so as to remain within the SALT II strategic arms limitation treaty ceiling on MIRVed ballistic missiles. Sam Rayburn was selected and was deactivated on 16 September 1985, with missile tubes filled with concrete and tube hatches removed. Her missile compartment was later dismantled and the two halves (bow and stern) of the ship were pulled together and welded in place for use as a training ship.

Sam Rayburn was decommissioned on 31 July 1989 and reclassified a moored training ship (MTS) with hull number MTS-635. Struck from the Naval Vessel Register on 31 July 1989, she arrived at the Naval Nuclear Prototype Training Unit at Goose Creek, South Carolina, in August 1989 after achieving initial criticality in her new role on 29 July 1989. Her modifications included special mooring arrangements, including Water Brake, a mechanism to absorb power generated by her main propulsion shaft. She operated as a moored training ship from 1989-2021. MTS-635 departed the Naval Nuclear Power Training Unit Charleston on 1 April 2021 via a tow vessel and escort, arriving at Norfolk Naval Shipyard in Portsmouth Virginia on 3 April 2021 to await defueling and eventual dismantling. The Naval Nuclear Power Training Unit at Goose Creek, South Carolina will continue to train students with replacement converted training ships; the USS La Jolla (SSN-701) and the USS San Francisco (SSN-711).

Sam Rayburn left Norfolk on April 2, 2025, bound for Bremerton, Washington for storage and eventual recycling.
