= Otranto Plantation =

Historic house in South Carolina, United States

- U.S. National Register of Historic Places
- Location within South Carolina Location within the United States
- Location: 18 Basilica Ave., near Hanahan, South Carolina
- Coordinates: 32°58′4″N 80°2′23″W
- Area: less than one acre
- Built: c. 1778, 1934
- NRHP reference No.: 78003191
- Added to NRHP: February 17, 1978

Otranto Plantation is a historic plantation house located in Hanahan, Berkeley County, South Carolina. It was built before 1778, and is a 1 1/2-half story, rectangular gable-roofed stuccoed brick dwelling. It has an attached colonnaded piazza, or porch, on three sides. Also on the property is a contributing small frame servants’ house.

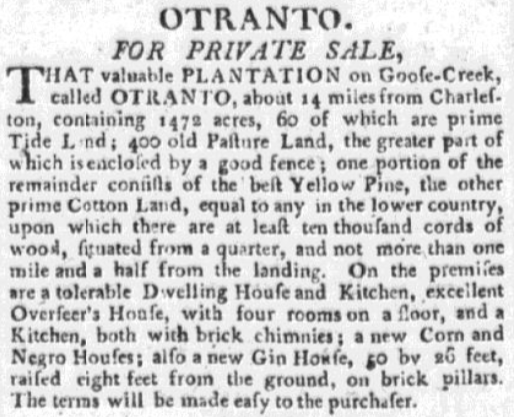
This advertisement from 1801 includes several details about the plantation.

In 1934, the house was destroyed by a fire. The house was meticulously restored based upon photographs before the fire.

It was listed in the National Register of Historic Places in 1978.
