= Defense Transportation Reporting and Control System =

The Defense Transportation Reporting and Control System (DTRACS) was a tracking and control system used by United States military units in Europe and South West Asia (SWA). The system is actually a commercial off the shelf (COTS) product from Omnitracs, and is in use by commercial trucking fleets throughout the world. Initially, when the system was first in use by the US Army in Europe (USAREUR), it was run through an Alcatel contract out of Paris with a data feed to the USAREUR G4 Logistics Automation Division (LAD).

After it became more heavily used, it was determined that the Army needed its own secure hub on a military base in Germany. This hub was located in Mannheim, Germany outside of Coleman Barracks at a location known as the "tank-farm". This location was chosen because it already housed other satellite hubs, one of which was for AFN.

The Land Earth Station (LES) portion of the system was maintained by a company called Data Path (which was acquired by Rockwell Collins in 2009). The servers that processed the messages and GPS location information through the QTRACS software were initially housed in Friedrichsfeld, Germany and maintained by the USAREUR G4 office. The G4 contracted this work out to the Titan Corporation (now owned by L3 Communications). Management of the program was eventually turned over to PEO EIS. The servers were eventually moved to Kilbourne Kasserne in Schwetzingen. This move was made because the facility at Friedrichsfeld was not robust enough and had a poor communications path with no redundancy. The site in Schwetzingen, also known as "Site-S", had better comms and was also an official military Network Operations Center (NOC).

At its height, there were three server stacks for processing DTRACS data. One stack for European devices, another for devices in SWA and a third for receiving a split-feed from the KBR (Kellog Brown and Root) owned and operated server. While KBR had their own vehicles and server, all three systems used the same satellite for their communications. As of January 2010 the KBR solution still exists, but was moved to Ramstein Airbase.

On the military side, the system was replaced by a newer system called Movement Tracking System, or MTS. The last use of DTRACS by US military personnel was in early 2007. While some devices are still used by KBR in their deployment, the military decided to switch to MTS instead of DTRACS for its logistics tracking solution. The primary reason for the switch is that MTS provided a mapping capability in the vehicle. Of course this came at a price. A typical DTRACS device cost in the neighborhood of $2,500, while an MTS device cost approximately $20,000 or more. Further funding for MTS from the military allowed the system to have Radio Frequency Identification (RFID) included in the system. This allowed the trucks to read active ANSI and ISO18000 RFID tags that were included in its cargo and report live locations back to the Radio Frequency - In-Transit Visibility (RF-ITV) system maintained by PEO EIS Product Director Automated Movement and Identification Solutions (PD AMIS)

== Capabilities ==
DTRACS devices were capable of sending messages to each other and their dispatchers. The dispatchers used either a DTRACS device in a box (referred to as a "Fly Away Kit" or FAK) or online software (QTRACS) to send and receive messages from the drivers. While the DTRACS FAK only allowed limited communications, the QTRACS software allowed the dispatcher to see all communications they sent to and from their trucks as well as their assigned vehicles "truck to truck" messages. It also provided topographical maps, and where necessary, satellite imagery provided by NIMA (now NGA).

Vehicles could send free text messages containing up to 1,900 characters. There were all preformatted or 'canned' messages where the driver only needed to fill in blank fields and hit send. Such messages included NBC1 reports, MEDIVAC message and arrival and departure messages among others.
