= MTSS =

MTSS may refer to:

== Organisations ==
- Ministerio de Trabajo y Seguridad Social, the Uruguayan ministry of labour and social security
- Ministry of Labour, Solidarity and Social Security (Ministério do Trabalho, Solidariedade e Segurança Social)
- Military Training and Survival School, of the Irish Air Corps
- Stock symbol of MTS (network provider) at the Moscow Exchange

== Other uses ==
- Medial tibial stress syndrome, known also as tibial periostitis or shin splints, a common injury affecting athletes
- Menstrual toxic shock syndrome (mTSS), a rare complication of tampon use
- Manuscript tracking systems (MTSs); See iThenticate
- Multiteam system (MTSs)

== See also ==
- MTSS1 (Metastasis suppressor protein 1), a protein
- MTS (disambiguation)
