= Movement Tracking System =

The United States Army's Movement Tracking System (MTS) is a logistics communication platform under the Program Executive Office (PEO) for Enterprise Information Systems (PEO EIS). It is designed for commanders to track assets on the battlefield with encrypted text messaging. It is a satellite-based tracking and communicating system designed to provide command and control over distributed assets supporting and conducting theater operations.

This system provides units with digital National Geospatial-Intelligence Agency maps, global positioning system (GPS) location data, and L-band (long band) satellite two-way text messaging.

—Lifesaving Technology for Logistic Vehicle Operators

== Operation ==
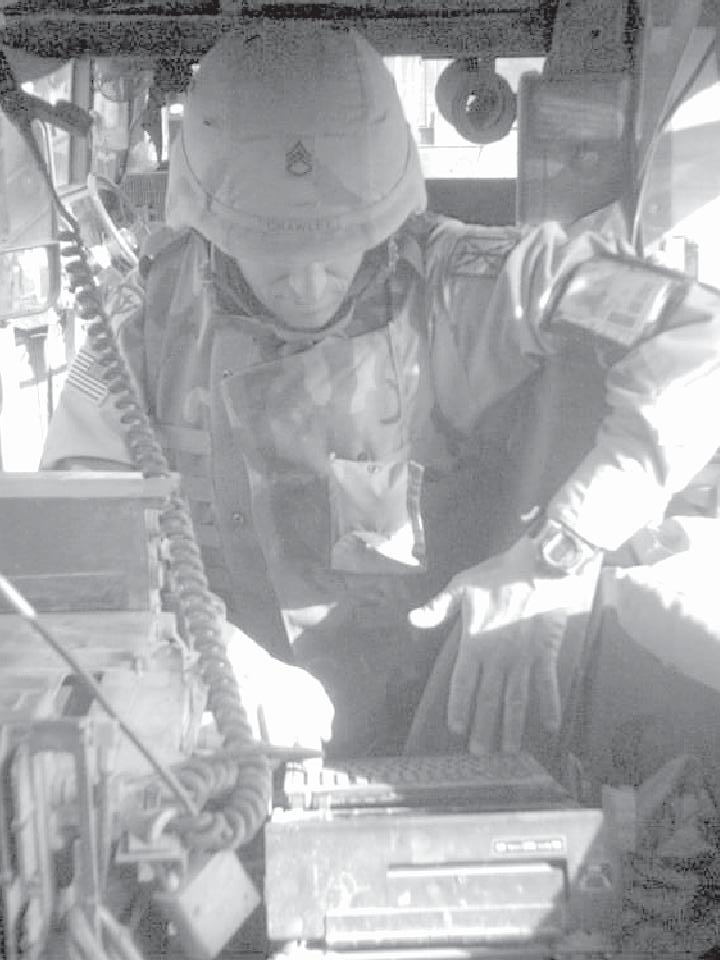
SSG Gary Crawley, 1-12 FA, operates an MTS mobile station mounted in his vehicle in Iraq.

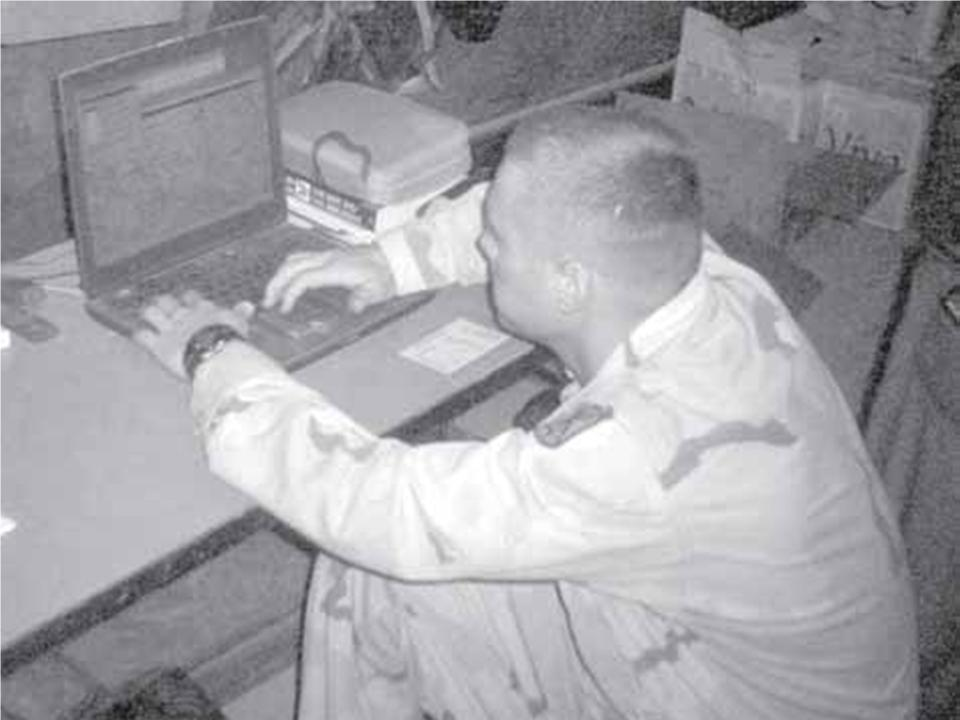
SGT Jeremy Bennett, 1-12 FA, operates an MTS control station in the battery administrative and logistics center in Iraq.

MTS can operate anywhere in the world giving over-the-horizon communications to vehicles on the move. Messages are transmitted via commercial satellites in near real-time and vehicle locations are displayed on computers with NGA maps. All messages are encrypted end-to-end, including sender and recipient addresses for information security purposes. MTS operates over a variety of [geostationary satellites] and is designed to transition automatically from one satellite system to another, as required.

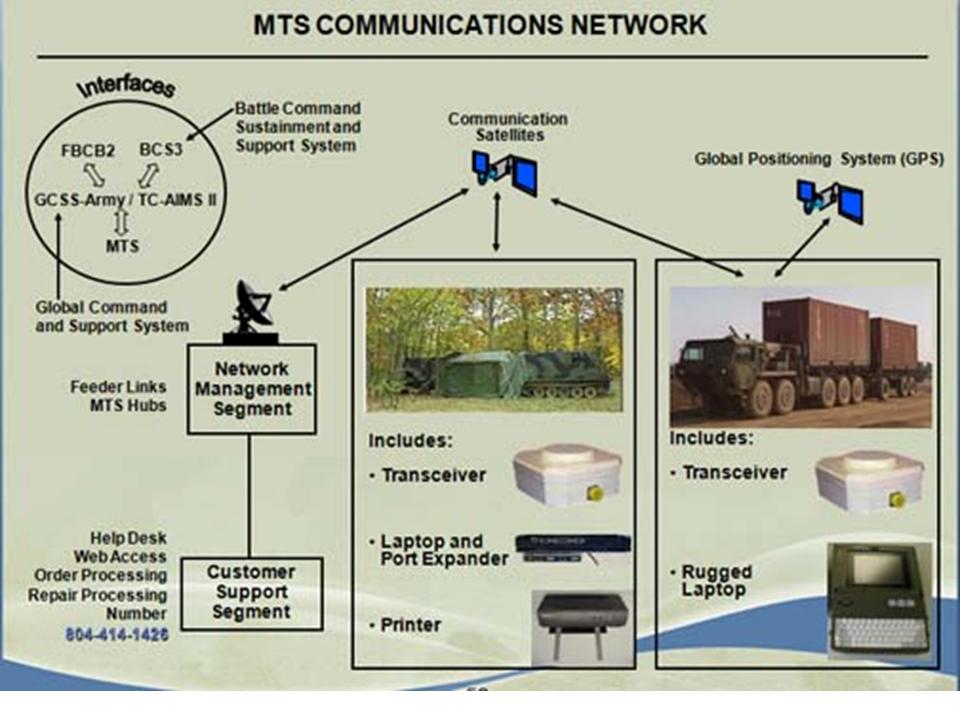

== Configuration ==
MTS computer systems come in two configurations, a mobile system that mounts in tactical vehicles and a laptop control station for use at a command post or at a higher headquarters. With this system implemented, it enables soldiers to communicate with other MTS-enabled vehicles and control stations as well as seeing their position. It is ideal for accurately identifying current vehicle locations and sending messages to and from the unit. With these two systems, the commander has accountability of the missions and orders directed and the subordinate units have a higher level of force protection due to the ability of the system. Leaders can pass critical information such as mission changes, alternate routes and other information essential to the mission to subordinate units in the field.

== History ==
Prior to the use of MTS, there existed a system called DTRACS from Qualcomm.
