= Merchant Taylors' School =

Merchant Taylors' School may refer to:

- Merchant Taylors' School, Northwood (founded 1561), is a British independent school for boys originally located in the City of London and now located in Hertfordshire, near Northwood in Middlesex
- Merchant Taylors' Boys' School, Crosby (founded 1620), a British independent school for boys, located in Great Crosby on Merseyside
- Merchant Taylors' Girls' School (founded 1888), a British independent school for girls, also located in Great Crosby on Merseyside

== See also ==
- Worshipful Company of Merchant Taylors
