= Nuclear Power School =

Technical school operated by the U.S. Navy

Naval Nuclear Power Training Command Nuclear Power School
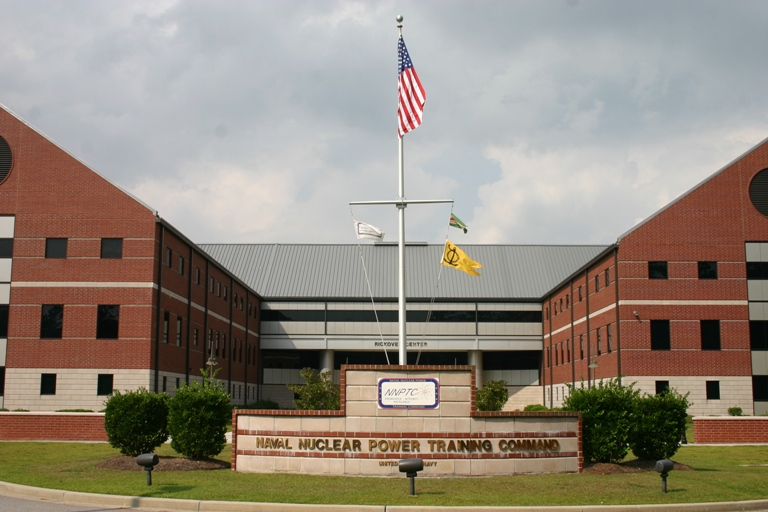
- Former name: Naval Nuclear Power School
- Motto: Knowledge, Integrity, Excellence
- Type: Military Technical School
- Established: 1955 by Admiral Hyman G. Rickover, USN
- Commanding Officer: Capt Larry J. Arbuckle, USN
- Administrative staff: 500
- Students: 2,500
- Location: Goose Creek, South Carolina, U.S. 32.9659°N 79.9678°W
- Campus: Naval Nuclear Power Training Command on Joint Base Charleston
- Website: www.navsea.navy.mil/Home/NNPTC/powerschool.aspx

The Nuclear Power School (NPS) is a technical training institution operated by the United States Navy in Goose Creek, South Carolina. It serves as a core component of the Navy’s program to prepare enlisted sailors, officers, and civilians employed at the Knolls Atomic Power Laboratory and Bettis Atomic Power Laboratory for the operation and maintenance of nuclear power plants aboard surface ships and submarines in the U.S. nuclear navy.

As of 2020, the U.S. Navy manages 98 nuclear power plants, including 71 submarines (each powered by a single reactor), 11 aircraft carriers (each with two reactors), two Moored Training Ships (MTS), and two land-based training plants.

NPS is the cornerstone of the Navy’s nuclear training pipeline. Enlisted personnel typically attend Nuclear Field "A" School before beginning at NPS, while officers and some civilian contractors enter the program with a college degree. The program culminates in certification as a nuclear operator at one of the Navy’s two Nuclear Power Training Units (NPTU). The curriculum at NPS is widely regarded as one of the most grueling in the U.S. military.

== Overview ==
Naval Nuclear Power Training Command Logo

Prospective enlisted enrollees in the Nuclear Power Program must have qualifying line scores on the ASVAB exam, may need to pass the NFQT (Nuclear Field Qualification Test), and must undergo a NACLC investigation for attaining a "Secret" security clearance. Additionally, each applicant must pass an interview with the Advanced Programs Coordinator in the associated recruiting district.

All officer students have had college-level courses in calculus and calculus-based physics. Acceptance to the officer program requires successful completion of interviews at Naval Reactors in Washington, D.C., and a final approval via a direct interview with the Director, Naval Nuclear Propulsion, a unique eight-year, four-star admiral position which was originally held by the program's founder, Admiral Hyman G. Rickover.

Women were allowed into the Naval Nuclear Field from 1978 until 1980, when the Navy began only allowing men again. With the repeal of the Combat Exclusion Law in the 1994 Defense Authorization Act, and the decision to open combatant ships to women, the Navy once again began accepting women into NNPS for duty aboard nuclear-powered surface combatant ships. In 2010 the Navy lifted the ban on women on submarines, and one year later the first female officers reported for duty onboard US Navy submarines. The first female enlisted sailors reported onboard submarines in 2015. In November 2015, the first female Reactor Officer, Commander Erica L. Hoffmann, took leadership of Reactor Department onboard USS George H.W. Bush. CVN Reactor Officer is the most senior shipboard nuclear officer position in the Navy, with a pre-requisite of completing a commanding officer tour on board a non-nuclear surface ship before the officer can receive a Reactor Officer assignment.

Following graduation from Boot Camp, enlisted personnel proceed to Nuclear Field "A" School for training in rating as Machinist's Mate (MMN), Electrician's Mate (EMN), or Electronics Technician (ETN). Active duty obligation is six years. Applicants must enlist for four years and concurrently execute an agreement to extend their enlistment for 24 months to accommodate the additional training involved. Personnel in the Nuclear Field program will be enlisted in paygrade E-3. Advancement to paygrade E-4 is authorized only after personnel complete all advancement-in-rate requirements (to include minimum time in rate) and Class "A" School, provided eligibility in the Nuclear Field program is maintained. If Nuclear Field Class "A" School training is not completed, the member may be administratively reduced to E-2 or E-1, depending on the member's time in rate at the date of disenrollment. Upon acceptance of automatic advancement to paygrade E-4, the member will be obligated for 12-months of the two-year extension, in addition to the four-year enlistment, regardless of whether advanced training (i.e. NPS/NPTU) is completed. They then continue to Nuclear Power School for an additional six months of college-level classroom instruction. Graduates of the Nuclear Power School undergo a further six months of training at a Nuclear Power Training Unit (NPTU). This training involves the operation and maintenance of nuclear reactor plants and steam plants. Graduates of NPTU are qualified as nuclear operators, and most graduates immediately receive assignments to serve on submarines and aircraft carriers in the fleet. Upon completion of training at NPS and NPTU, the sailor is obligated to the remaining 12 months of the two-year extension.

A few students from each NPTU class are selected as a Junior Staff Instructor (JSI) based on top academic performance throughout the program, evaluation for aptitude to be an instructor, and willingness to incur an additional 24-month service obligation, for a total of eight years on active duty. JSIs receive additional instructor training at the NPTU and then train students themselves for 24 months before eventually continuing on to serve in the fleet. Additionally, a few MMN graduates from each NPTU class are selected to undergo further training in the Engineering Laboratory Technician (ELT) specialty. ELTs are responsible for collection, analysis, and controls of reactor plant and steam generator water chemistry, as well as radiological analysis and controls. Upon completion of ELT training graduates are given assignments to the fleet.

== History of locations ==
After Admiral Rickover became chief of a new section in the Bureau of Ships, the Nuclear Power Division, he began work with Alvin M. Weinberg, the Oak Ridge National Laboratory (ORNL) director of research, to initiate and develop the Oak Ridge School of Reactor Technology (ORSORT) and to begin the design of the pressurized water reactor for submarine propulsion. Training for Fleet operators was subsequently conducted by civilian engineers at Idaho Falls, Idaho (1955-1958) and West Milton, New York (1955-1956). The first formal Nuclear Power School was established in New London, Connecticut in January 1956 with a pilot course offered for six officers and fourteen enlisted men. This school remained in use through Class 62-2 in 1962, after which the school was relocated to Bainbridge, Maryland.

Subsequent locations were United States Naval Training Center Bainbridge, Maryland (1962-1976); Mare Island Naval Shipyard, California (1958-1976); Naval Training Center Orlando, Florida (1976-1998) and its current location, Goose Creek, South Carolina. In 1986, Nuclear Field A School was established in Orlando to provide nuclear in-rate training to Sailors prior to attending Nuclear Power School.

In 1993, in response to the Base Realignment and Closure-directed closure of NTC Orlando by the end of Fiscal Year 1999, the Nuclear Field A School and Nuclear Power School were joined to create Naval Nuclear Power Training Command. A move from Orlando, Florida to Goose Creek, South Carolina began in May 1998 and was completed in January 1999. Construction of the new command allowed Nuclear Field A School and Nuclear Power School to be located in the same building. At full capacity, the NNPTC complex can accommodate over 3,600 students and 480 staff members.

== College credit (enlisted training) ==
The American Council of Education recommends an average of 60-80 semester hours of college credit in the lower-division baccalaureate/associate degree category for completion of the entire curriculum including both Nuclear Field "A" School and Naval Nuclear Power School. The variation in total amount depends on the specific pipeline completed — MM, EM, or ET. Further, under the Servicemembers Opportunity Colleges degree program for the Navy (SOCNAV), the residency requirements at these civilian institutions are reduced to only 10-25%, allowing a student to take as little as nine units of coursework (typically three courses) through the degree-granting institution to complete their Associate in Applied Science degree in nuclear engineering technology or as much as 67 units to complete a bachelor's degree in Nuclear Engineering Technology or Nuclear Energy Engineering Technology.

The following colleges offer college credit and degree programs to graduates of the U.S. Naval Nuclear Power School (NNPS):

- Thomas Edison State University School of Applied Science and Technology Bachelor of Science in Applied Science and Technology (BSAST) Degree is designed for graduates of the U.S. Navy nuclear power program and degrees granted after October 2010 are accredited by the Technology Accreditation Commission (TAC) of the Accreditation Board for Engineering and Technology (ABET).
- Old Dominion University's Batten College of Engineering & Technology offers a Bachelor of Science in Engineering Technology accredited by the Technology Accreditation Commission (TAC) of the Accreditation Board for Engineering and Technology (ABET). The Nuclear Engineering Technology Option of the Mechanical Engineering Technology major is a special program available to graduates of the U.S. Navy Nuclear Power School.,
- Excelsior University School of Business and Technology's Bachelor of Science Nuclear Engineering Technology Degree. The Excelsior College baccalaureate degree program in nuclear engineering technology is also accredited by TAC of ABET.
- Rensselaer Polytechnic Institute Department of Mechanical, Aerospace, and Nuclear Engineering, in cooperation with the Education for Working Professionals Office and the U.S. Navy, have developed undergraduate degree programs in nuclear engineering for graduates of the U.S. Navy Nuclear Power Training School.

== Nuclear Power Training Unit ==
The Kesselring Site in New York has the longest operational history of the NPTUs. In 2012 it celebrated the 50,000th sailor qualified at the site. However, two other NPTU sites also provided operational training during the Cold War.

From the early 1950s to the mid-1990s, Naval Reactors Facility (NRF) in Idaho trained nearly 40,000 Navy personnel in surface and submarine nuclear power plant operations with three nuclear propulsion prototypes — A1W, S1W, and S5G.

From 1959 until 1993, over 14,000 Naval operators were trained at the S1C prototype at Windsor, Connecticut.

The current Nuclear Power Training Unit is located at the Charleston Naval Weapons Station, Joint Base Lindsey Graham (>17,000 acres, 27 square miles) which includes the moored training ships (MTS), USS Daniel Webster (SSBN-626), USS La Jolla (SSN-701), and USS San Francisco (SSN-711) The unit's first MTS, USS Sam Rayburn (SSBN-635), was inactivated in early 2021. Also, the Navy will be building an additional nuclear power simulator at the P200 Nuclear Power Training Facility. The new 280,000 square foot facility is budgeted for $500 million dollars.
