= USS Daniel Webster =

US navy submarine

USS Daniel Webster (SSBN-626)
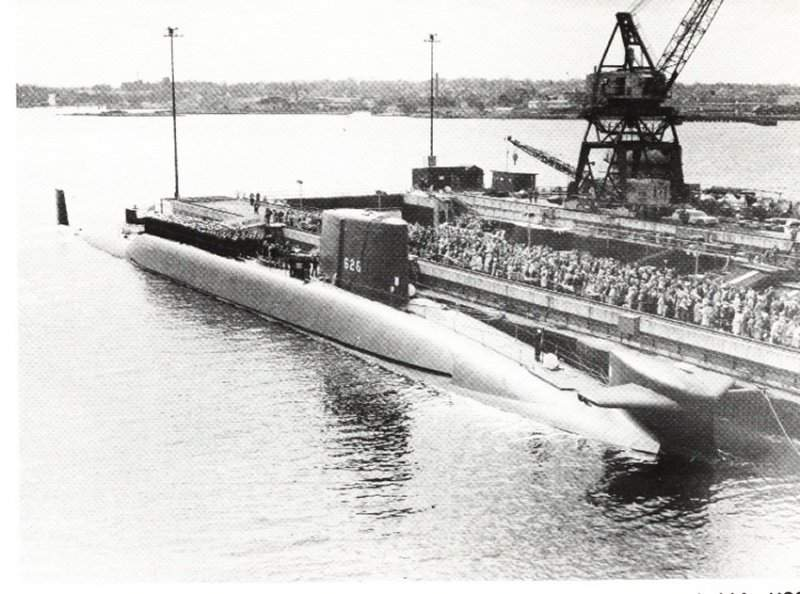
- USS Daniel Webster (SSBN-626) with her unusual original bow plane configuration.

History

United States
- Name: Daniel Webster
- Namesake: Daniel Webster (1782–1852), an American statesman
- Ordered: 3 February 1961
- Builder: General Dynamics Electric Boat, Groton, Connecticut
- Laid down: 28 December 1961
- Launched: 27 April 1963
- Sponsored by: Mrs. W. Osborn Goodrich, Jr.
- Commissioned: 9 April 1964
- Decommissioned: 30 August 1990
- Motto: Liberty and Union
- Nickname(s): "Old Funny Fins"
- Fate: In Norfolk Naval Shipyard in Portsmouth, Virginia, awaiting inactivation.

General characteristics
- Class & type: Lafayette-class ballistic missile submarine (hull design SCB-216)
- Displacement: 7,250 long tons (7,370 t) surfaced; 8,250 long tons (8,380 t) submerged
- Length: 425 ft (130 m)
- Beam: 33 ft (10 m)
- Draft: 31 ft 6 in (9.60 m)
- Propulsion: 1 × S5W reactor; 2 × Westinghouse geared turbines 15,000 shp (11,000 kW)
- Speed: 20 knots (37 km/h) surfaced; 25 knots (46 km/h) submerged
- Complement: Two crews (Blue and Gold), 13 officers and 130 enlisted men each
- Sensors & processing systems: BQS-4 sonar
- Armament: 4 × 21 in (530 mm) Mark 65 torpedo tubes with Mark 113 firecontrol system, for Mark 48 torpedoes; 16 × vertical tubes for Polaris or Poseidon ballistic missiles

USS Daniel Webster (SSBN-626), a Lafayette-class ballistic missile submarine (FBM), was the only ship of the United States Navy to be named for Senator Daniel Webster.

== Construction and commissioning ==
The contract to build Daniel Webster was awarded to the Electric Boat Division of General Dynamics Corporation in Groton, Connecticut, on 3 February 1961 and her keel was laid down there on 28 December 1961. She was launched on 27 April 1963, sponsored by Mrs. Mary Ernestine (Appleton) Goodrich, great-great granddaughter of Daniel Webster and wife of W. Osborn Goodrich, Jr., and commissioned on 9 April 1964, with Commander Marvin S. Blair in command of the Blue Crew and Commander Lloyd S. Smith in command of the Gold Crew.

Daniel Webster was originally built with diving planes mounted on a "mini-sail" near the bow, leading to her nickname "Old Funny Fins". This configuration, unique to US submarines, was an attempt to reduce the effect of porpoising. While successful, the "mini-sail" required to contain the operating mechanism reduced hydrodynamic efficiency and lowered her overall speed. During a mid-1970s overhaul, these unusual planes were removed and standard fairwater planes were installed.

== Operational history ==
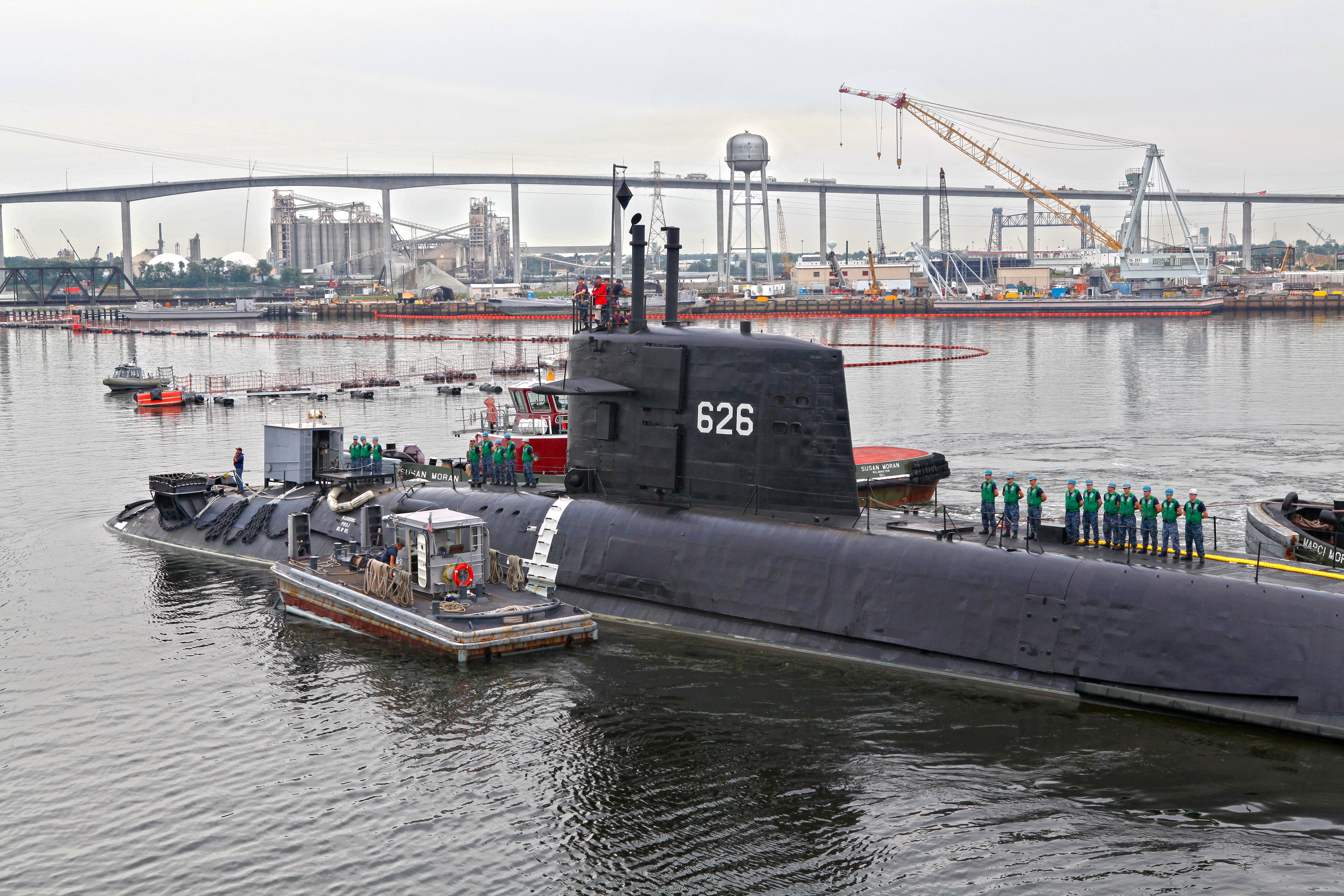
The moored training ship Daniel Webster (MTS-626) being towed from Norfolk Naval Shipyard to Charleston, South Carolina, after undergoing a maintenance availability (27 August 2012)

While in service, Daniel Webster was the last Lafayette-class submarine to be retrofitted to carry UGM-73 Poseidon missiles.

Patrol history includes: Patrol 50 (Gold Crew) July, 1982 from Holy Loch, port calls Groton, CT, and Kings Bay, GA; Patrol 52 Feb 1983 ERP Holy Loch; Patrol 56 March 1984 from Holy Loch, port call Naples, Italy; port call Groton, CT in transit to the Naval Weapons Station, Charleston, SC, March 1985; ERP Charleston, April 1985; Patrol 60 June 1985; Patrol 66 (Gold Crew) December 1986 - March 1987; port call Naples, Italy, March 1987; Patrol 68 June 1987 from Holy Loch, port call November 1987 Lisbon, Portugal.

== Decommissioning and conversion ==
Daniel Webster was decommissioned on 30 August 1990 and struck from the Naval Vessel Register the same day. She was converted to a moored training ship (MTS) and S5W reactor prototype training facility, by the Charleston Naval Shipyard at Charleston, South Carolina. Upon completion and designation as the MTS-626, she was towed up-river to her permanent berth at Naval Nuclear Power Training Unit (NPTU) Charleston in Goose Creek, SC. In August 2026, after more than 30 years of training students, MTS-626 was towed from NPTU to Norfolk Naval Shipyard in Portsmouth, Virginia to be defueled and inactivated, after which she is expected to again be towed to Puget Sound Naval Shipyard and Intermediate Maintenance Facility for recycling.
