= USS La Jolla =

Los Angeles-class nuclear-powered attack submarine of the US Navy

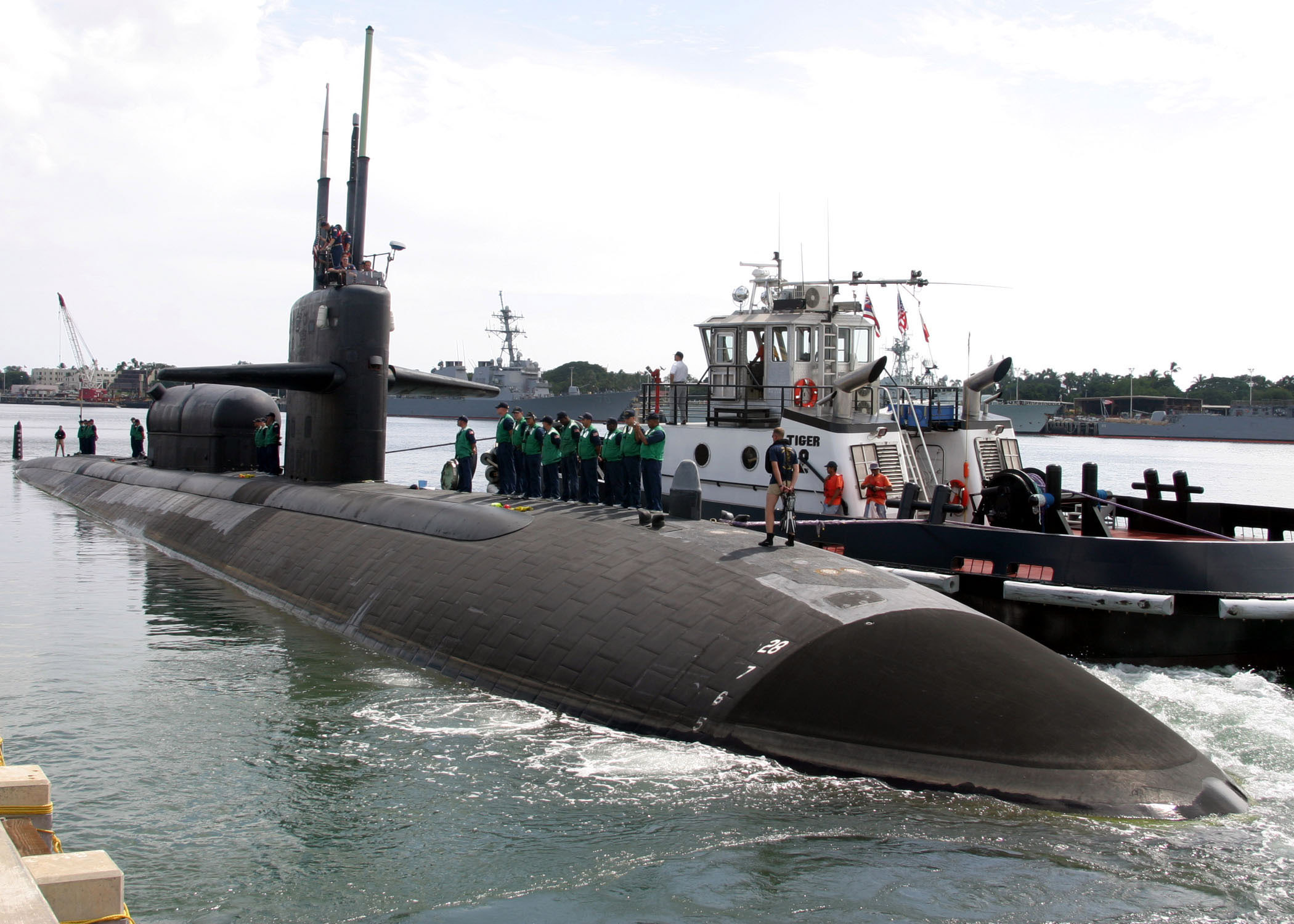
- USS La Jolla (SSN-701) departing Pearl Harbor

History

United States
- Name: USS La Jolla
- Namesake: The Community of La Jolla, California
- Ordered: 10 December 1973
- Builder: General Dynamics Electric Boat
- Laid down: 16 October 1976
- Launched: 11 August 1979
- Sponsored by: Mrs. Bob Wilson
- Commissioned: 24 October 1981
- Decommissioned: 15 November 2019
- Out of service: 3 February 2015
- Home port: Goose Creek, South Carolina
- Motto: Latin: Fortes Fortuna Juvat; ("Fortune Favors the Brave")
- Status: Currently a moored training ship at the Charleston Nuclear Power Training Unit
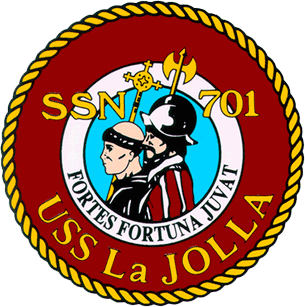
- Badge

General characteristics
- Class & type: Los Angeles-class submarine
- Displacement: 5774 tons light, 6141 tons full, 367 tons dead
- Length: 362 ft (110 m) (original), 438 ft (134 m) (as MTS)
- Beam: 33 ft (10 m)
- Draft: 32 ft (9.8 m)
- Propulsion: 1 × S6G reactor, single screw
- Complement: 12 officers, 98 men

USS La Jolla (SSN-701/MTS-701) is a Los Angeles-class submarine, named for the La Jolla community in San Diego, California. The contract to build her was awarded to the Electric Boat Division of General Dynamics Corporation in Groton, Connecticut on 10 December 1973 and her keel was laid down on 16 October 1976. She was launched on 11 August 1979 sponsored by Mrs. Jean Bryant Wilson, wife of Congressman Bob Wilson, and commissioned on 24 October 1981. In 2017, La Jolla was converted to a Moored Training Ship and is currently stationed at NPTU Charleston in Goose Creek, SC.

== Service history ==
During the sea trials for La Jolla, an unexpected depth excursion occurred during a propulsion plant "crash back" test at the direction of Admiral Hyman G. Rickover. In late 1982, about 30 miles out of San Francisco, La Jolla, while at periscope depth, collided with the submarine USS Permit, operating on the surface. La Jolla suffered minor rudder damage, while putting a 10-by-3-foot (3.05 m × 0.91 m) scrape in the paint on Permit's keel. La Jolla was the first to successfully test fire a Tomahawk cruise missile while submerged at the Pacific Missile Test Center on 29 April 1983.

The first West Pacific (West-Pac) cruise was between August 1984 and February 1985, in which La Jolla visited ports in Olongapo Philippines, Hong Kong, Chinhae Korea, and Yokosuka, Japan. All crew members participating in the second half of the 1984–85 West-Pac cruise received the Navy Expeditionary Medal for operations in the Sea of Japan.

On 11 February 1998, about 9 miles out of Chinhae, South Korea, La Jolla accidentally ran into and sank a 27-ton fishing trawler. The five crewmembers of the trawler were rescued by the crew of La Jolla. In 2000, La Jolla was modified to carry a Dry Deck Shelter (DDS). On 23 August 2004, La Jolla returned to Pearl Harbor after a six-month deployment in the Pacific Ocean. She conducted port visits in Korea, Japan, Singapore, Saipan, and Guam, and participated in five international exercises, including Pacific Reach 2004.

== Post stand-down conversion to training ship ==
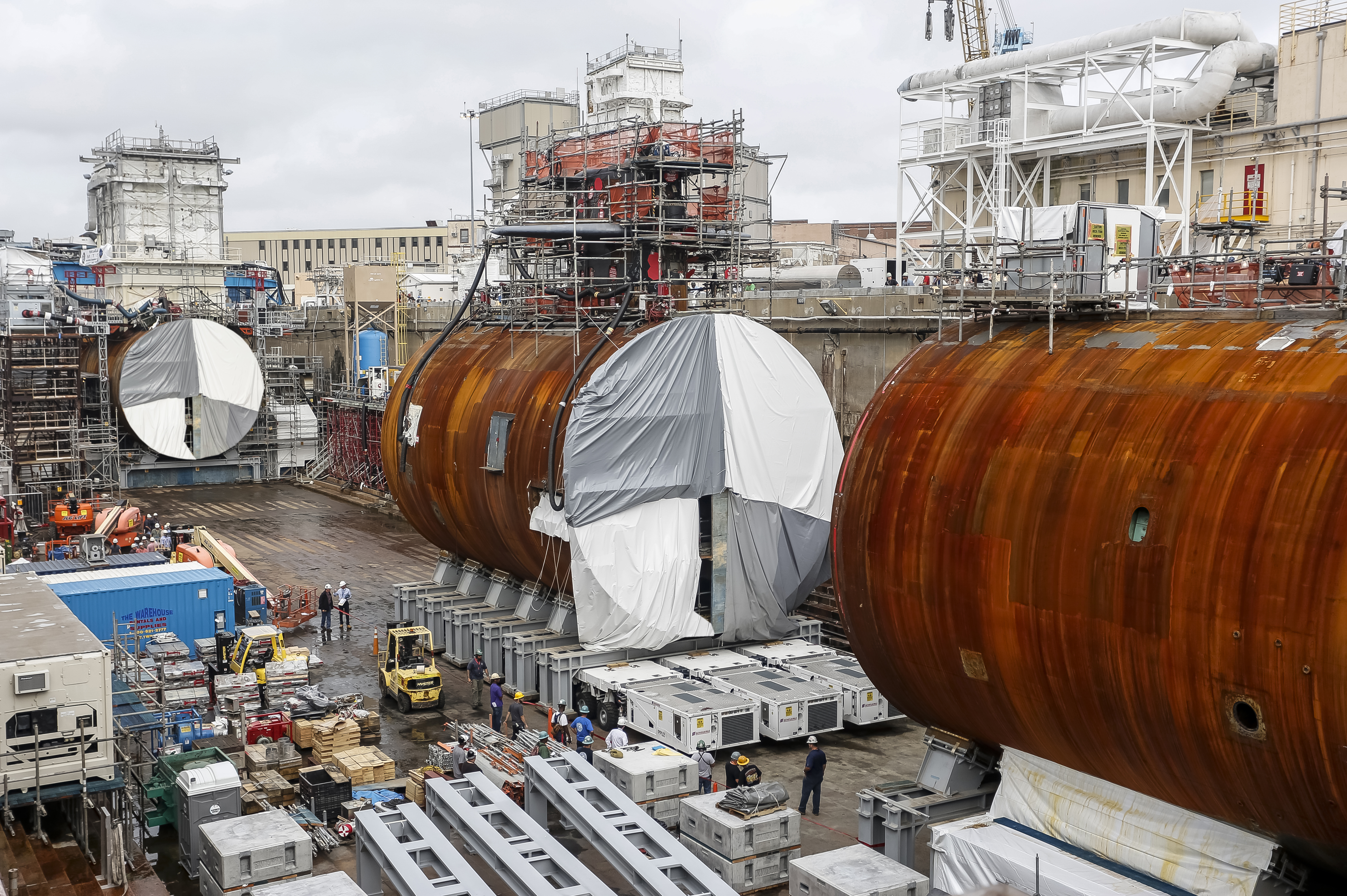
La Jolla conversion to a Moored Training Ship at the Norfolk Navy Yard, September 2015

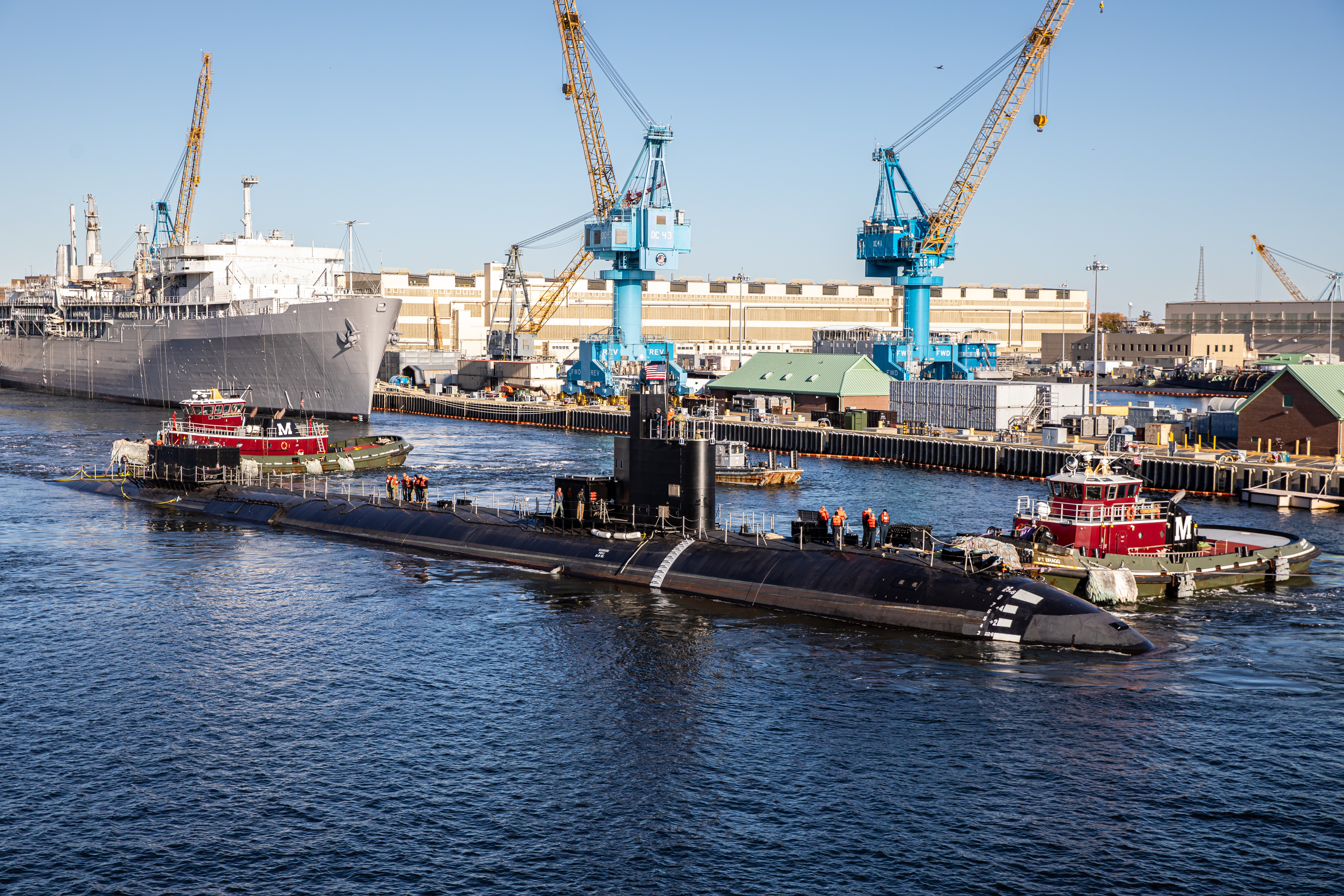
La Jolla after finishing of the conversion

La Jolla was converted to a Moored Training Ship (MTS) in August 2017 and decommissioned and stricken from the Naval Vessel Register on 15 November 2019. The conversion to a MTS began in February 2015 and completed in late 2019. After a "Fast Cruise" period in the spring of 2020, La Jolla was certified and cleared for student training. The conversion to a MTS was expected to take 32 months according to the commanding officer, however it took much longer. During her time in shipyard, the submarine was cut into three pieces, and a portion of the hull taken out. Three new hull sections from General Dynamics Electric Boat were added to accommodate the sub's new mission. A newly fabricated hull section was welded in place, and the new compartment (OPS, or Operations) contains training spaces, office spaces, and an emergency safeguard system. La Jolla is permanently moored at Nuclear Power Training Unit (NPTU) at Naval Support Activity Charleston in South Carolina.
