= Moored training ship =

US Navy nuclear submarine training ships

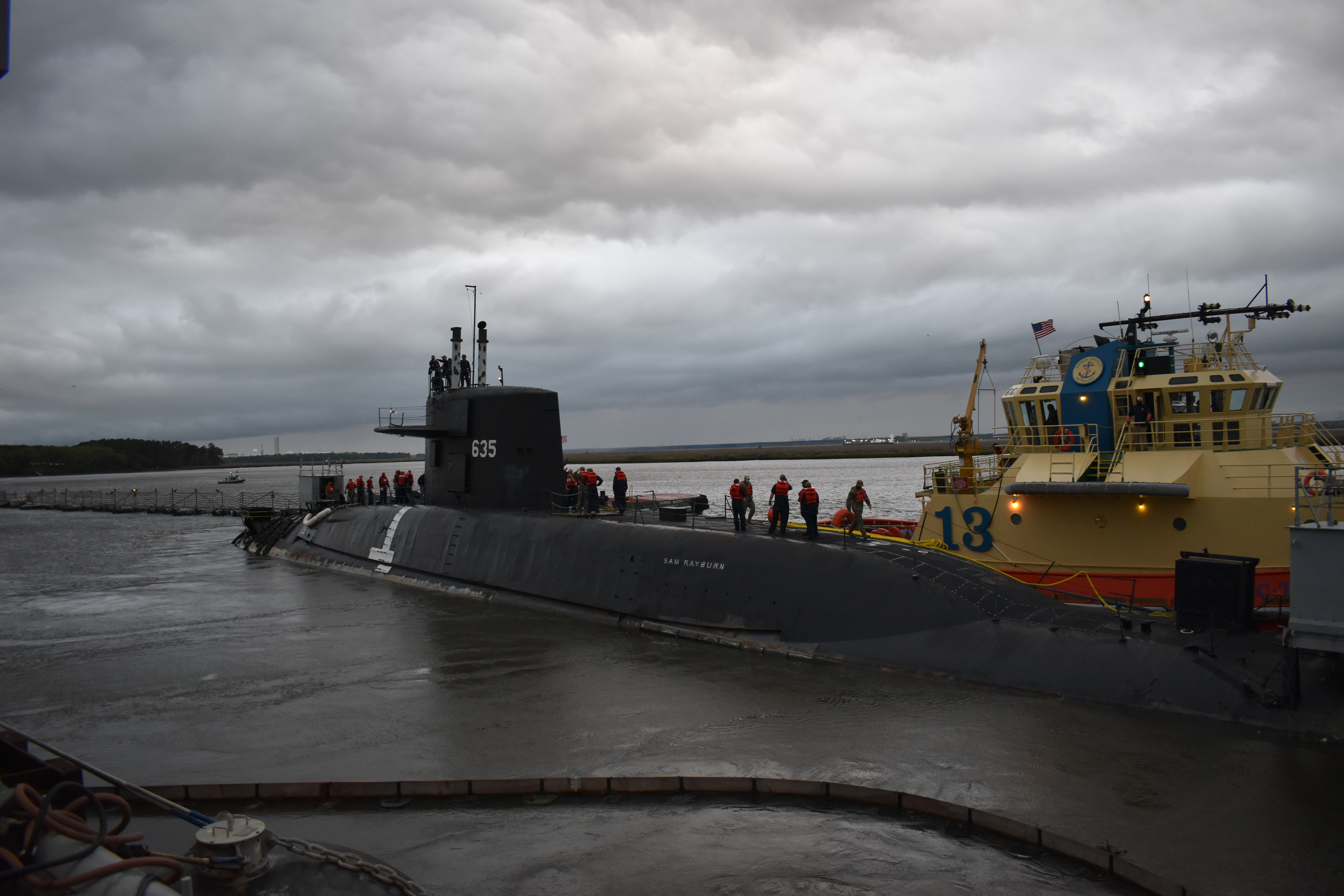

A moored training ship (MTS) is a United States Navy nuclear powered submarine that has been converted to a training ship for the Nuclear Power Training Unit (NPTU) at Naval Support Activity Charleston in South Carolina. The Navy uses decommissioned nuclear submarines and converts them to MTSs to train personnel in the operation and maintenance of submarines and their nuclear reactors. The first moored training ship was USS Sam Rayburn (SSBN-635) a James Madison-class fleet ballistic missile submarine, redesignated as (MTS-635) in 1989, followed a year later by USS Daniel Webster (SSBN-626), a Lafayette-class ballistic missile submarine, redesignated as (MTS-626). Conversion of these two boats took place at the Charleston Naval Shipyard and modifications included special mooring arrangements with a mechanism to absorb power generated by the main propulsion shaft.

The Navy added two more moored training ships to this facility, USS La Jolla (SSN-701) and USS San Francisco (SSN-711), a pair of Los Angeles-class attack submarines. The conversions for these two took place at the Norfolk Naval Shipyard and then were towed to NPTU Charleston. La Jolla became inactive in early 2015 and began the 32 month conversion to a training ship. Changes include having the hull cut into three sections, with the center section being recycled and the other two joined with three new sections, manufactured by Electric Boat, extending the overall length by 23 m (76 ft). The project was expected to be completed by the end of 2018. San Francisco arrived at Norfolk to begin her conversion in January 2018. La Jolla arrived at NPTU Charleston in 2019 and San Francisco arrived in 2021.

With the addition of La Jolla and San Francisco, the Navy retired Sam Rayburn and Daniel Webster. Sam Rayburn was towed to Norfolk Naval Shipyard in 2021 to be inactivated, and Daniel Webster will also be inactivated at Norfolk, sometime later.

== Moored training ships ==
Name	Hull number	Builder	Ship class	Laid down	Launched	Commissioned	Reclassified as MTS	Inactivated as MTS
Sam Rayburn	SSBN-635	Newport News Shipbuilding and Drydock Co.	James Madison	3 December 1962	20 December 1963	2 December 1964	31 July 1989	1 April 2021
Daniel Webster	SSBN-626	General Dynamics Electric Boat	Lafayette	28 December 1961	27 April 1963	9 April 1964	30 August 1990	December 2023
La Jolla	SSN-701	General Dynamics Electric Boat	Los Angeles	16 October 1976	11 August 1979	24 October 1981	15 November 2019	Active
San Francisco	SSN-711	Newport News Shipbuilding and Drydock Co.	Los Angeles	26 May 1977	27 October 1979	24 April 1981	16 August 2021	Active

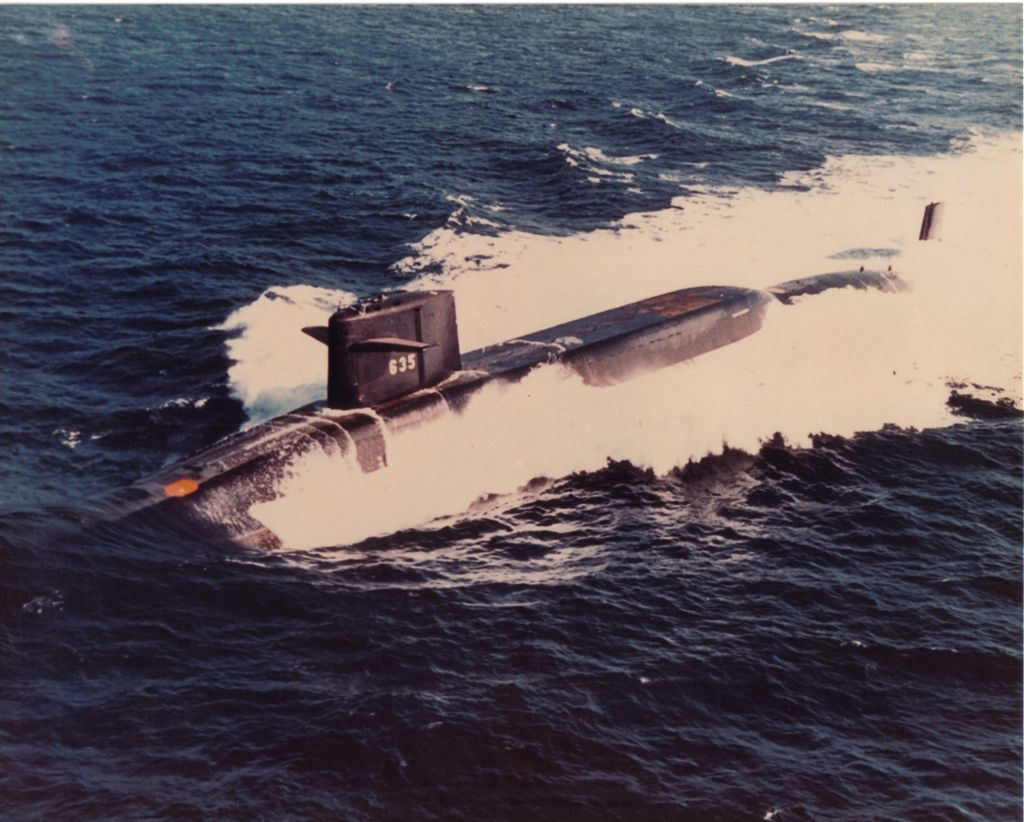
Sam Rayburn

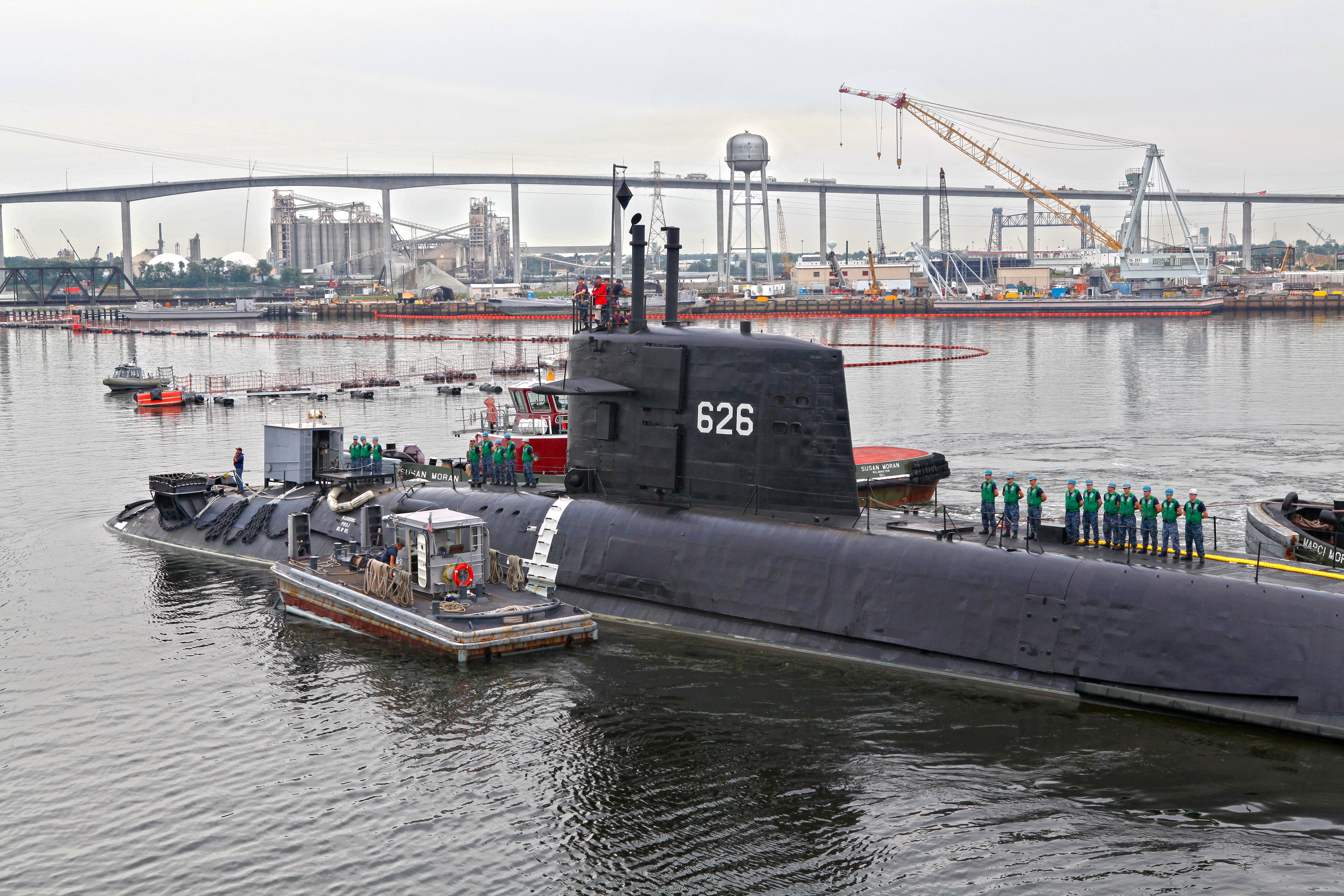
Daniel Webster

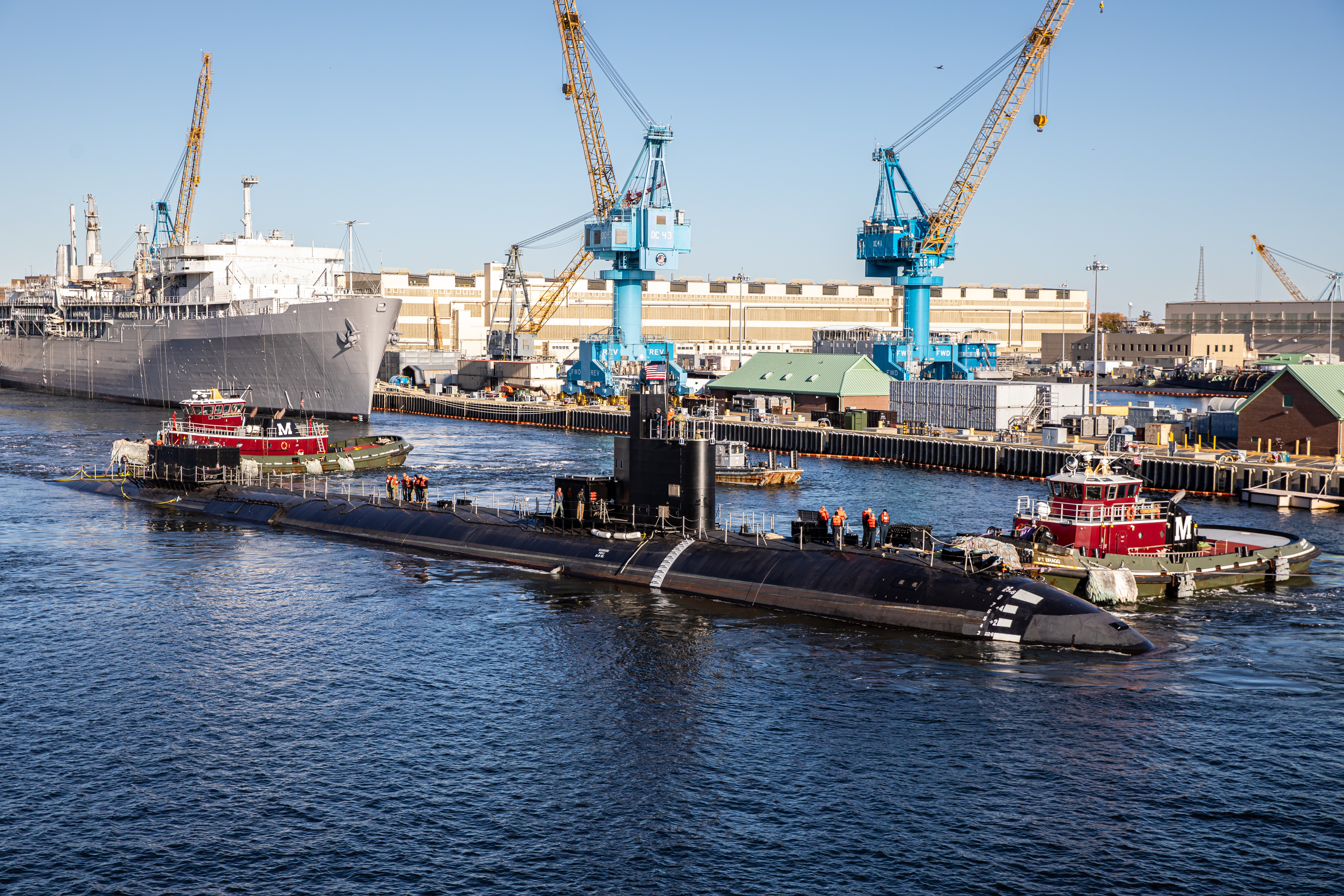
La Jolla
(after conversion to a Moored Training ship)

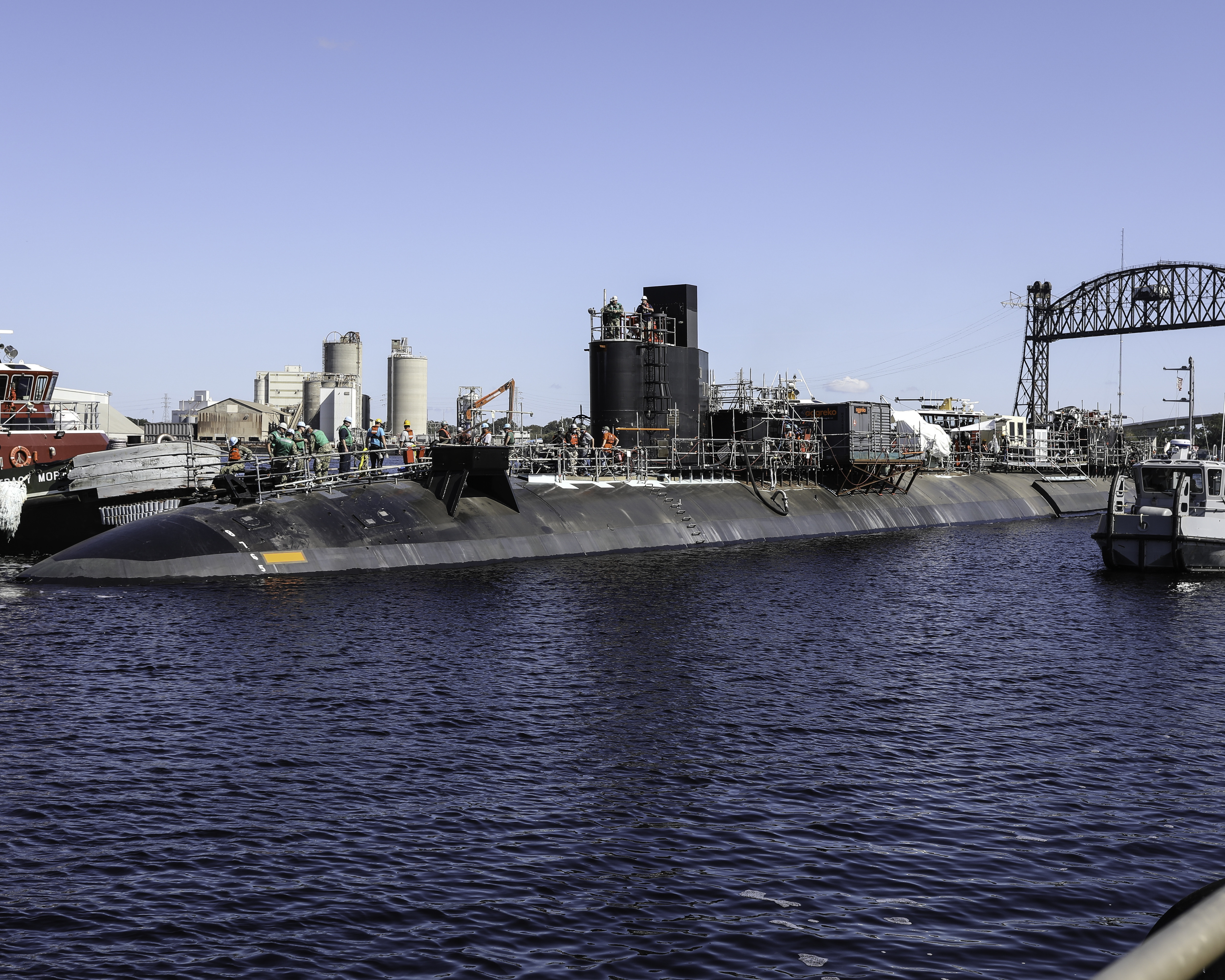
San Francisco
(during the conversion to a Moored Training Ship)

== See also ==
- United States Navy Nuclear Propulsion
- Nuclear marine propulsion
- United States naval reactors
- List of United States Naval reactors
- Hulk (ship type)
