= USS San Francisco (SSN-711) =

Los Angeles-class nuclear-powered attack submarine of the US Navy

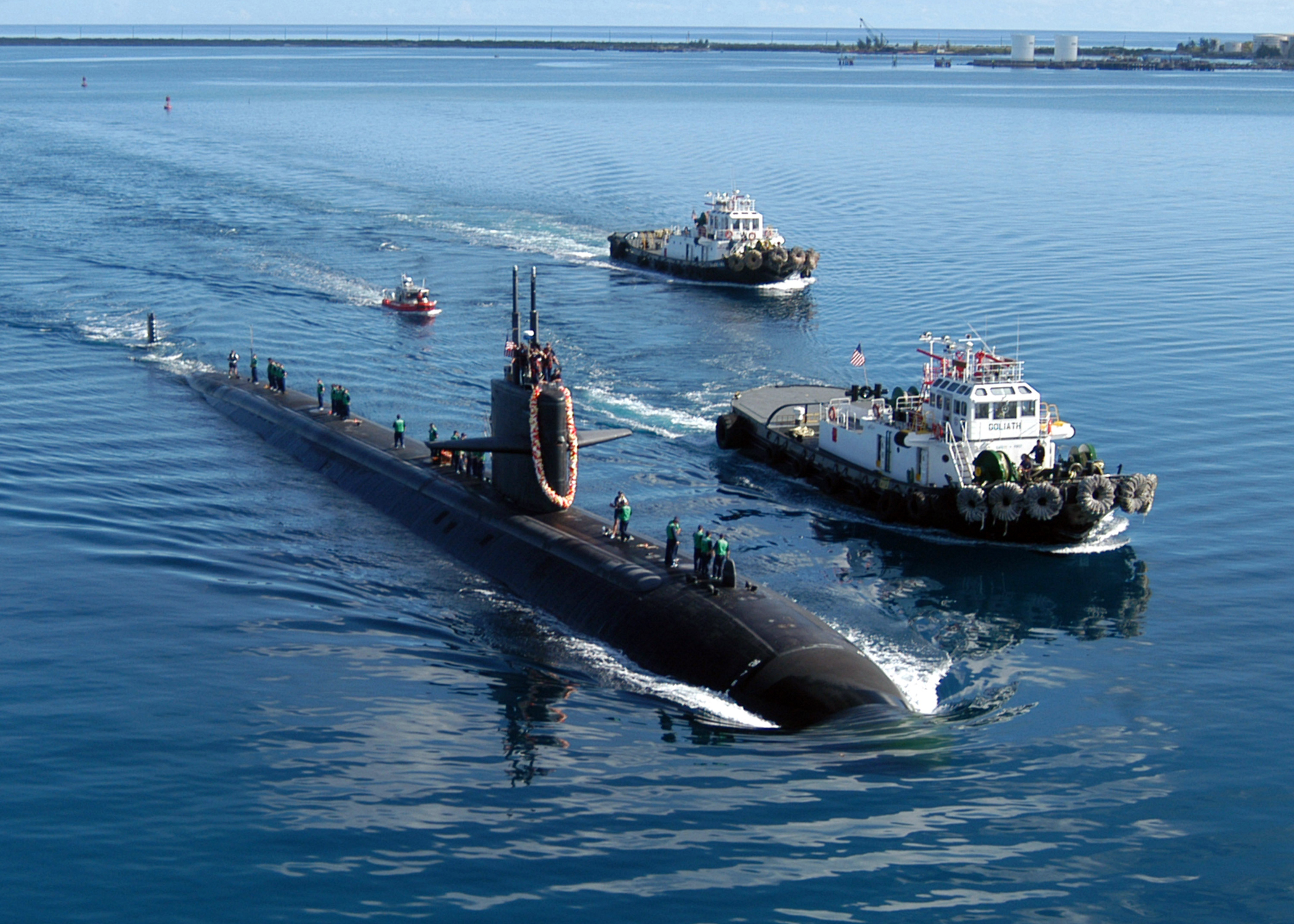
- USS San Francisco (SSN-711)

History

United States
- Name: San Francisco
- Namesake: City and County of San Francisco
- Awarded: 1 August 1975
- Builder: Newport News Shipbuilding
- Laid down: 26 May 1977
- Launched: 27 October 1979
- Acquired: 7 April 1981
- Commissioned: 24 April 1981
- Decommissioned: 15 May 2022
- Out of service: 11 May 2017
- Home port: Goose Creek, South Carolina
- Motto: Oro en Paz, Fierro en Guerra; ("Gold in Peace, Iron in War")
- Status: Currently a moored training ship at the Nuclear Power School
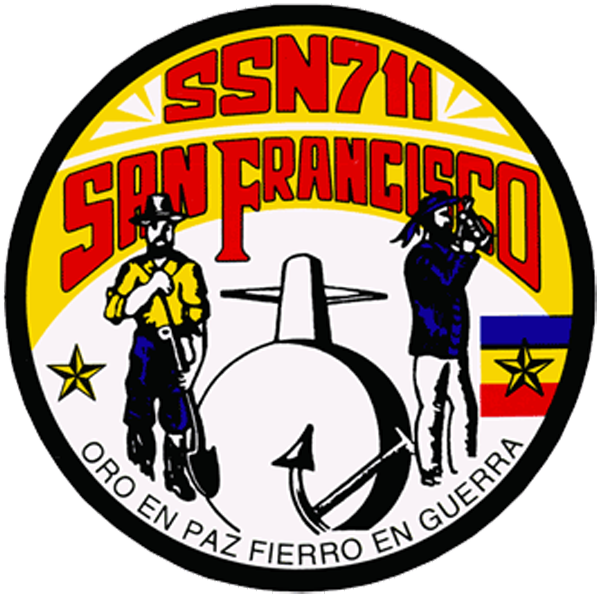
- Badge

General characteristics
- Class & type: Los Angeles-class submarine
- Displacement: 5,759 tons light, 6,145 tons full, 386 tons dead
- Length: 110.3 m (361 ft 11 in)
- Beam: 10 m (32 ft 10 in)
- Draft: 9.7 m (31 ft 10 in)
- Propulsion: S6G nuclear reactor
- Complement: 12 officers, 115 men
- Armament: 4 × 21 in (533 mm) torpedo tubes

USS San Francisco (SSN-711) is a Los Angeles-class nuclear submarine, the third vessel of the United States Navy to be named for San Francisco, California.

== History ==
Newport News Shipbuilding and Dry Dock Company in Newport News, Virginia, was awarded the contract to build USS San Francisco on 1 August 1975, and her keel was laid down on 26 May 1977. She was launched on 27 October 1979, sponsored by Mrs. Robert Y. Kaufman, and commissioned on 24 April 1981 with Commander J. Allen Marshall in command.

San Francisco joined Submarine Force US Pacific Fleet following an initial shakedown cruise and moved to her homeport at Pearl Harbor. She completed deployments in 1982, 1983, 1985, and 1986 with the U.S. Seventh Fleet and various independent operations in the Pacific in 1986, earning the Battle Efficiency "E" for Submarine Squadron Seven in 1985. She earned a Navy Unit Commendation and a second Battle Efficiency "E" for Submarine Squadron Seven, and her crew was awarded the Navy Expeditionary Medal for independent operations in 1988.

San Francisco entered a Depot Modernization Period at Pearl Harbor from 1989 to 1990 and then went on to conduct deployments to the Western Pacific in 1992 and 1994. The submarine was awarded the 1994 Commander Submarine Squadron Seven "T" for excellence in tactical operations and a Meritorious Unit Commendation for the 1994 Western Pacific deployment.

On 18 December 2002, San Francisco arrived at her new homeport at Apra Harbor, Guam.

The submarine was homeported at Naval Base Point Loma, San Diego, California, in 2009.

=== Grounding with seamount ===
On 8 January 2005 at 02:43 GMT, San Francisco suffered a collision with an undersea mountain about 364 nautical miles (675 km) southeast of Guam while operating at flank (maximum) speed at a depth of 525 feet (160 m).

Official US Navy reporting subsequent to the grounding cited the location as "in the vicinity of the Caroline Islands". The position of the impact was estimated by a newspaper account as 7.752°N 147.210°E, between Pikelot and Lamotrek Atolls.

The collision was so serious that the vessel was almost lost; accounts detail a desperate struggle for positive buoyancy to surface after the forward ballast tanks were ruptured. Ninety-eight crewmen were injured, and Machinist's Mate Second Class Joseph Allen Ashley, 24, of Akron, Ohio, died from head injuries on 9 January. Other injuries to the crew included broken bones, spinal injury, and lacerations.

San Francisco's forward ballast tanks and her sonar dome were severely damaged, but her pressure hull was not breached and no damage to her nuclear reactor occurred. She surfaced and arrived in Guam on 10 January, accompanied by USCGC Galveston Island, USNS GySgt Fred W. Stockham, and USNS Kiska, as well as MH-60S Knighthawks and P-3 Orion maritime patrol aircraft.

The Navy said it had "absolutely no reason to believe that it struck another submarine or vessel." Later, an examination in drydock showed unmistakably that she had struck an undersea mountain.

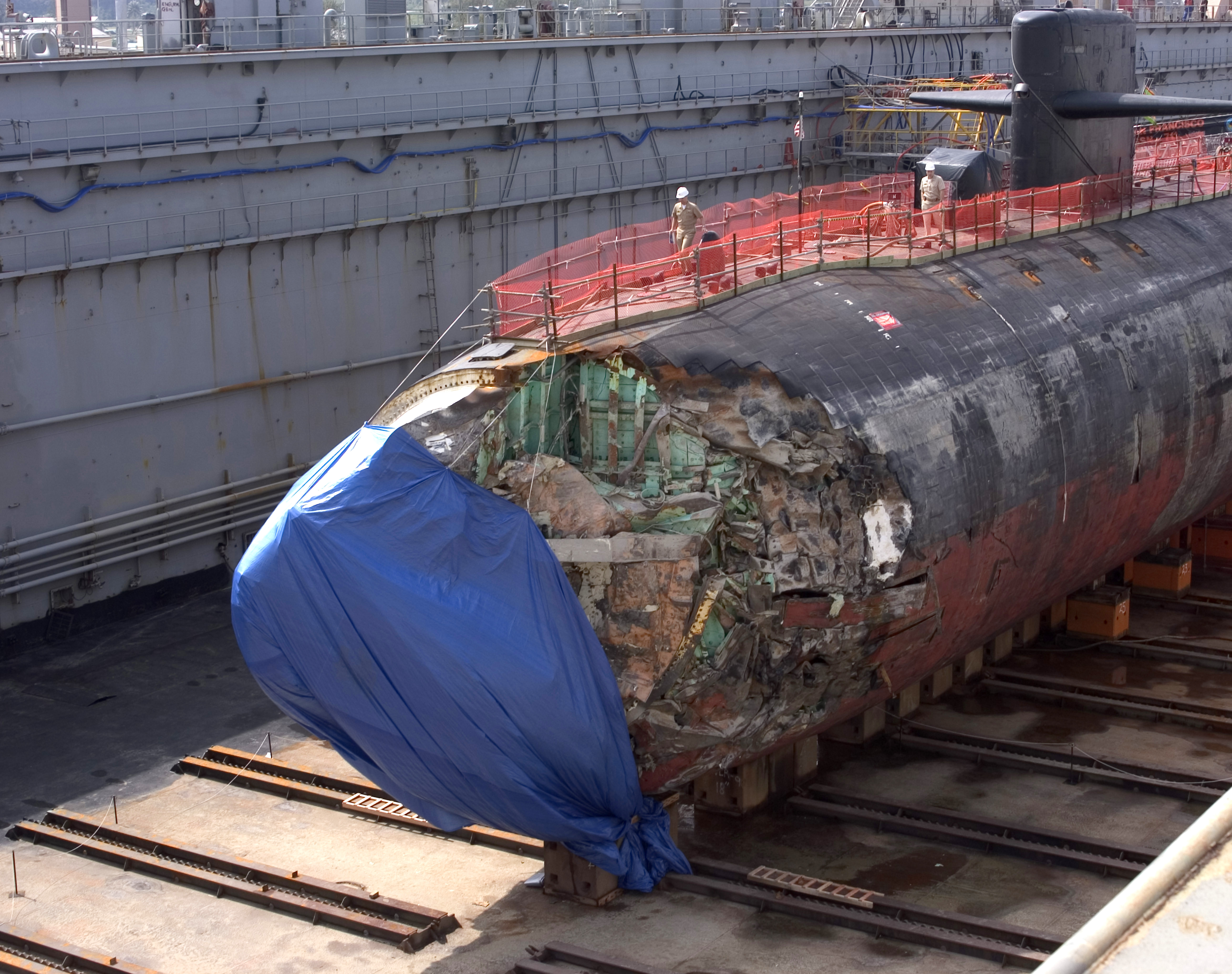
San Francisco in drydock at Guam, January 2005

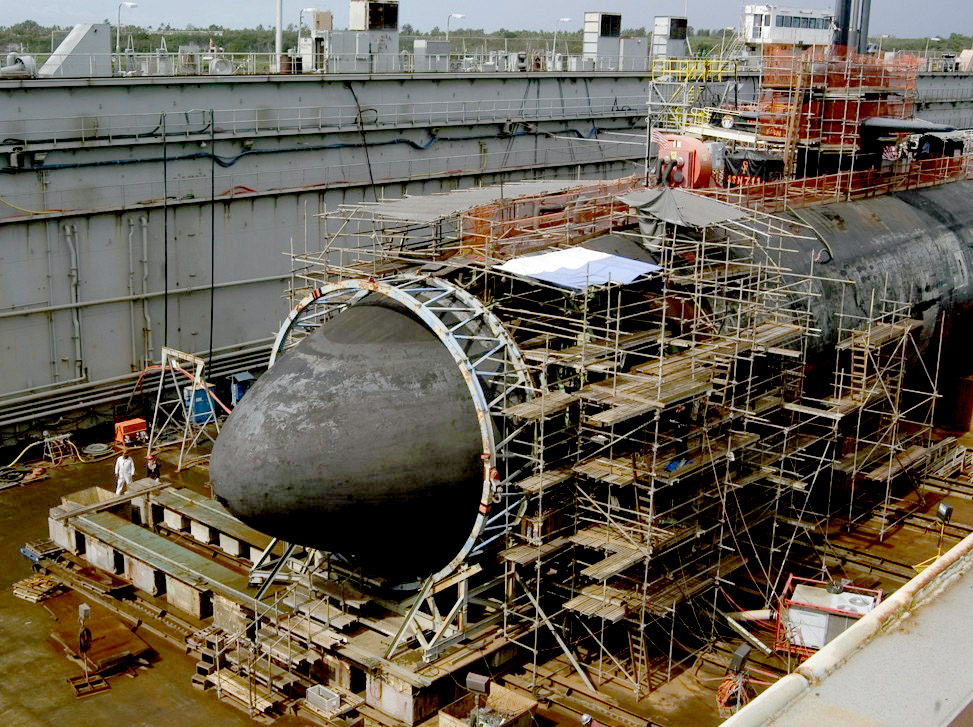
San Francisco in a drydock in Guam during her temporary repairs for her voyage to Puget Sound, May 2005

San Francisco's captain, Commander Kevin Mooney, was reassigned to a shore unit in Guam during the investigation of the collision. The Navy concluded that "several critical navigational and voyage planning procedures" were not being implemented aboard San Francisco, despite Mooney's otherwise remarkably good record. Consequently, the Navy relieved Mooney of his command and issued him a letter of reprimand.

Six crewmen received non-judicial punishment hearings for hazarding a vessel and dereliction of duty, and they were reduced in rank and given letters of reprimand.

Twenty other officers and men received awards for their actions in the crisis, including letters of commendation, the Navy and Marine Corps Achievement Medal, the Navy and Marine Corps Commendation Medal, and the Meritorious Service Medal.

The seamount that San Francisco struck did not appear on the chart in use at the time of the grounding, but other charts available for use indicated an area of "discolored water", an indication of the probable presence of a seamount. The Navy determined that information regarding the seamount should have been transferred to the charts in use – particularly given the relatively uncharted nature of the ocean area that was being transited – and that the failure to do so represented a breach of proper procedures.

Nonetheless, a subsequent study by UMass Amherst indicated that the Navy's charts did not contain the latest data relevant to the crash site because the geographical area was not a priority for the Defense Mapping Agency. Moreover, a subsequent report "found that the (submarine's parent) squadron and the group could have done more to prepare the ship for sea." Specifically, it determined that the submarine's squadron "did not take adequate action to correct previously identified deficiencies in open ocean navigation onboard SFO," and did not provide adequate oversight of San Francisco's navigation performance. Additionally, "The report also notes the document known as a 'Subnote' from the Group, which laid out a path and average speed, was delivered to the ship two-and-a-half days before San Francisco sailed, and the Group's own requirements are that it be to the ship three to five days before sailing." Ultimate responsibility for navigational safety rests with the ship's captain and crew, not the Subnote; however, "The report found that the Subnote did route the San Francisco through the area where it hit the seamount."

San Francisco had recently replaced her nuclear fuel, and she was thus expected to remain in service until 2017, so the Navy determined that repair of the submarine was in its best interests. Temporary repairs were made in Guam to provide watertight integrity and forward buoyancy so that the boat could safely transit to another location for more extensive repairs. San Francisco steamed to Puget Sound Naval Shipyard (PSNS) in Bremerton, Washington via Pearl Harbor, Hawaii, where she arrived on 26 August 2005.

In June 2006, the Navy announced that San Francisco's bow section would be replaced at the PSNS with the bow of USS Honolulu, which was soon to be retired. San Francisco was four years older than Honolulu, but she had been refueled and upgraded in 2000–2002. The cost of her bow replacement was estimated at $79 million, as compared with the estimated $170 million to refuel and overhaul the nuclear reactor of Honolulu.

On 10 October 2008, San Francisco undocked after a successful bow replacement at the PSNS. The dry-docking project involved cutting the forward ballast tanks and sonar sphere, weighing over one million pounds (450,000 kg), off the former USS Honolulu and attaching them to San Francisco. San Francisco completed repairs and sea trials in April 2009, then shifted homeport to Naval Base Point Loma, San Diego, California.

=== Final deployment and conversion ===
San Francisco returned to Point Loma from her sixth deployment in October 2016. Her change of command and farewell ceremony was held on 4 November 2016, after which she was homeported to Norfolk for conversion to a moored training ship (MTS) at the Navy's Nuclear Power Training Unit in Charleston, South Carolina. On 11 May 2017, the ship was placed in "'In Commission Special' – stand down for MTS conversion", a 32-month long process that was expected to begin in early 2018. The conversion was completed in mid-2021 and on 16 August she was moved from Norfolk to Charleston. She was decommissioned on 15 May 2022.

== See also ==
- Major submarine incidents since 2000
- USS Connecticut (SSN-22), a submarine that collided with a seamount in 2021
