= List of ship commissionings in 1963 =

The list of ship commissionings in 1963 includes a chronological list of all ships decommissioned in 1963.

	Operator	Ship	Flag	Class and type	Pennant	Other notes
15 March	Royal Navy	Hampshire		County-class destroyer	D06	
23 March	Lloyd Triestino	Galileo Galilei	Italy	Ocean liner		
13 April	United States Navy	Tattnall		Charles F. Adams-class destroyer	DDG-19	
11 May	United States Navy	Wright		Saipan-class aircraft carrier converted to command ship	CC-2	
11 May	United States Navy	Vancouver		Raleigh-class amphibious transport dock	LPD-2	
25 May	United States Navy	Gridley		Leahy-class cruiser	DLG-21	
6 June	German Navy	Lübeck		Köln-class frigate	F224	
20 June	Rederi Ab Ålandsfärjan	Ålandsfärjan	Finland	Ferry		ex-Brittany with Southern Railway Co.
15 July	French Navy	Foch		Clemenceau-class aircraft carrier	R99	
20 July	United States Navy	Guadalcanal		Iwo Jima-class amphibious assault ship	LPH-7	
3 August	United States Navy	Worden		Leahy-class cruiser	CG-18	
15 August	Royal Navy	Kent		County-class destroyer	D12	
4 November	Royal Navy	London		County-class destroyer	D16	
9 November	United States Navy	Goldsborough		Charles F. Adams-class destroyer	DDG-20	
23 November	United States Navy	Dale		Leahy-class cruiser	DLG-19	
