= USS Reeves (DLG-24) =

Leahy-class cruiser of the US Navy (in service 1964-93)

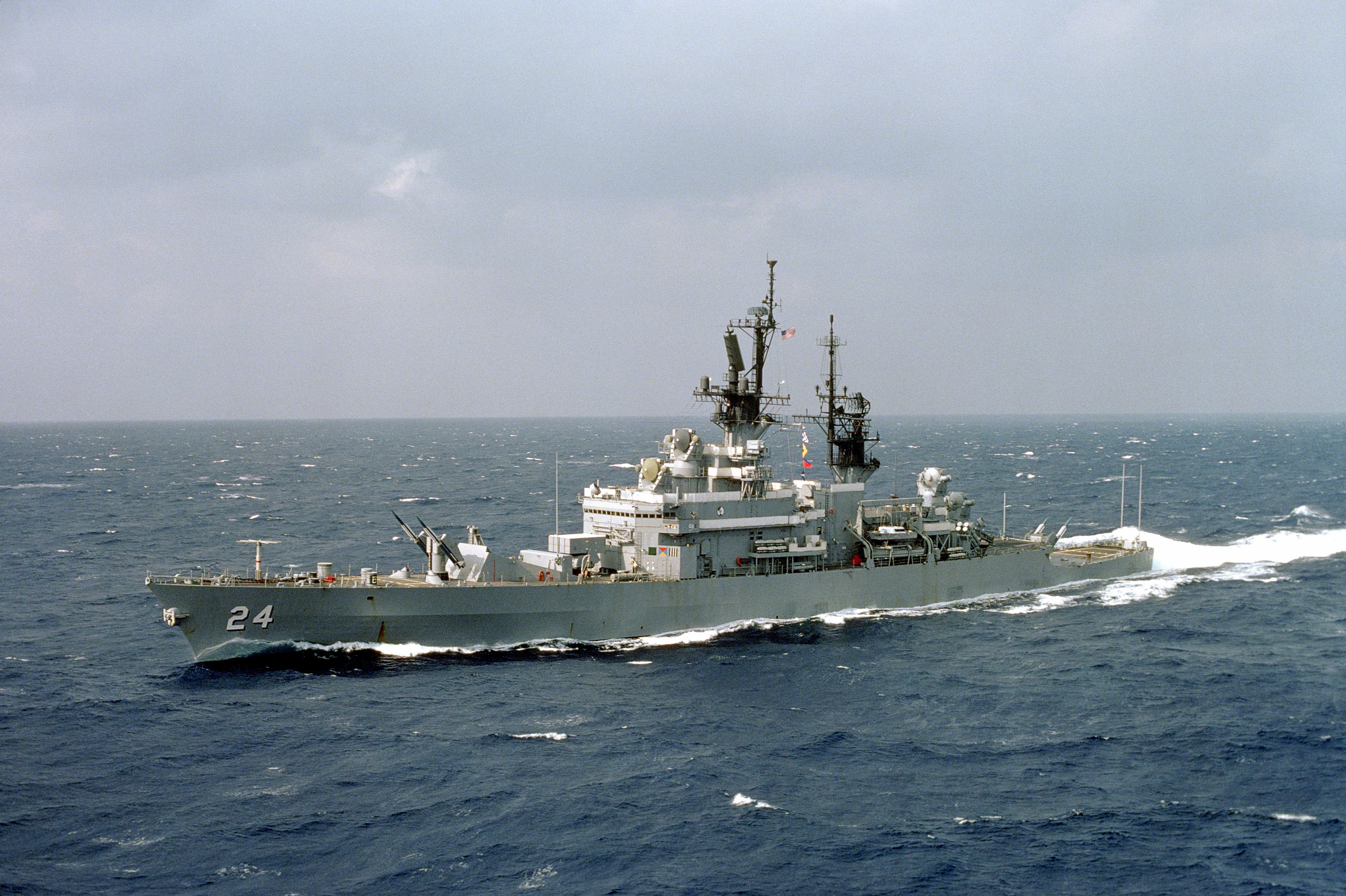
- USS Reeves (CG-24)

History

United States
- Name: Reeves
- Namesake: Joseph M. Reeves
- Builder: Puget Sound Naval Shipyard, Bremerton, Washington
- Laid down: 1 July 1960
- Launched: 12 May 1962
- Sponsored by: Mrs. Joseph M. Reeves, Jr
- Acquired: 14 August 1970
- Commissioned: 15 May 1964
- Decommissioned: 12 November 1993
- Reclassified: CG-24 30 June 1975
- Stricken: 12 November 1993
- Motto: Proud to Serve
- Fate: Sunk as target 31 May 2001 026° 26’ 53.0 S 155° 24’ 27.0 E
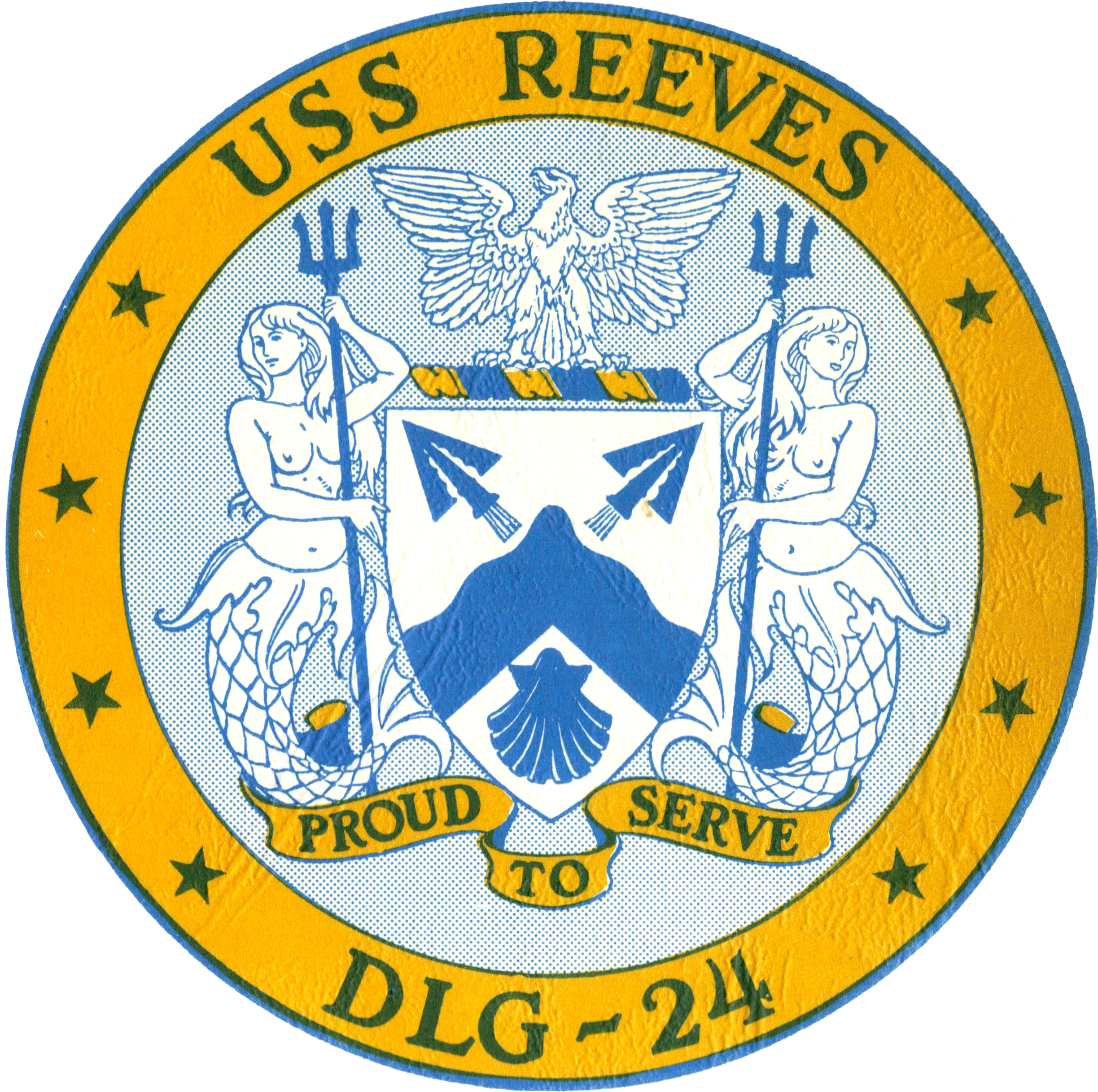
- Badge

General characteristics
- Class & type: Leahy-class cruiser
- Displacement: 4,650 tons (light); 5,670 tons (standard); 8,203 tons (full load)
- Length: 535 ft (163 m)
- Beam: 53 ft (16 m)
- Draft: 26 ft (7.9 m)
- Installed power: 4 x Foster-Wheeler 1,200 psi boilers; 85,000 shp (63,000 kW)
- Propulsion: 2 x Allis-Chalmers geared steam turbines; 2 shafts
- Speed: 32.7 kn (60.6 km/h)
- Range: 8,000 nautical miles (15,000 km) at 20 knots (40 km/h), 1,800 tons of fuel
- Complement: 413 (32 officers / 381 enlisted)
- Sensors & processing systems: AN/SPS-48E 3D Air Search Radar (Bearing, range and height); AN/SPS-49 2D Air Search Radar (Bearing and range); AN/SPS-10F Surface Search radar; 4 × AN/SPG-55B missile fire control radars; CRP-2900 (Pathfinder) navigational radar; AN/SQQ-23 series bow-mounted sonar
- Electronic warfare & decoys: SLQ 32V Nixie towed torpedo decoy, 4x Mark 36 SRBOC chaff / flares
- Armament: 2 × Mk 10 Mod 5 missile launchers, one forward and one aft, for RIM-2 Terrier/RIM-67 Standard ER missiles. (88 Terriers in two magazines); 8 × RGM-84A Harpoon missiles in two Mk 141 quad launchers; 8 × Anti-Submarine Rocket (ASROC) launcher in a Mk 16 Mod 7 box launcher; 6 × Mk 46 torpedo in two Mk 32 12.75-inch triple tube launchers; 2 × 20 mm/76 Mk 15 Vulcan Phalanx 6-barreled CIWS; 2 × twin 3 in (76 mm)/50 cal anti-aircraft gun mounts; 2 × 40 mm saluting guns (fitted)
- Aircraft carried: Helicopter landing area aft for VERTREPS with limited support facilities; no hangar

USS Reeves (DLG/CG-24), a United States Navy ship named after Admiral Joseph Mason Reeves (Commander-in-Chief of the US Fleet, 1934–1936), was a Leahy-class cruiser built by the Puget Sound Naval Shipyard, in Bremerton, Washington.

Reeves began her history as a Leahy-class destroyer leader (DLG-24) when her keel was laid down on 1 July 1960. She was launched on 12 May 1962 and commissioned on 15 May 1964. Mrs. Joseph M. Reeves, Jr., daughter-in-law of Vice Adm. Reeves, was the ship's sponsor.

Reeves was later reclassified as a guided missile cruiser (CG-24) on 30 June 1975. On 12 November 1993, Reeves was decommissioned and stricken from the Navy Register at Pearl Harbor Naval Base. Reeves remained in mothballs until she was sunk as a target ship on 31 May 2001.

== Operational history ==
=== The 1960s ===
The second Reeves, DLG-24, was laid down 1 July 1960 by the Puget Sound Naval Shipyard, Bremerton, Washington; launched 12 May 1962; sponsored by Mrs. Joseph M. Reeves, Jr.; and commissioned 15 May 1964.

Following an extended trial and shakedown period, Reeves was homeported at Long Beach where she underwent availability and further training. On 10 April 1965, she departed for her first tour with the 7th Fleet in the western Pacific (WESTPAC). Deployed for just over six months, she operated primarily in support of Allied operations off the coast of the Republic of Vietnam, serving as an anti-aircraft warfare (AAW) picket, first with TG 77.3 built around aircraft carrier USS Oriskany, then with TG 77.6 centered on aircraft carrier USS Midway. Returning to Long Beach on 3 November 1965, she conducted local operations for the remainder of the year and into 1966. On 26 May 1966, she got underway for Japan and a two-year nonrotated tour with the 7th Fleet. Arriving at her new homeport of Yokosuka on 16 June, she departed shortly thereafter and on 7 July and anchored at Da Nang. to begin another tour off the embattled coast. For the next two years, she regularly sailed south from Japan for combat air-sea rescue (CSAR) tours off Vietnam, compiling a total of 493 days underway, 312 of which were spent in the Gulf of Tonkin.

Reeves rotated back to the United States in August 1968 and operated out of Long Beach for the remainder of the year, participating in local operations, as well testing and evaluating radar systems. In early 1969, Reeves was ordered to Maine for overhaul and modernization at Bath Iron Works. Arriving on 31 March, she was placed out of commission (special) on 10 April and the extensive modification work began.

=== The 1970s ===
Reeves was recommissioned 29 August 1970 at Bath. She spent the period from 10 September – 19 November making the passage from Bath to her new home port at Pearl Harbor. The uncommonly long duration of the passage was due to frequent stops along the way at various ports for additional work to be done and by a three-week refresher training (REFTRA) period in the vicinity of Guantanamo Bay, Cuba. After arriving at Pearl Harbor, Reeves engaged in numerous exercises and operations in the waters around Hawaii.

June 1971 found Reeves steaming westward for another deployment in the Gulf of Tonkin. Reeves returned to Pearl Harbor on 20 December 1971 and remained in the Hawaii and west coast areas until September 1972 where she participated in various operations and exercises, notably a Midshipman cruise in July. She departed Hawaii on 18 September, headed for her second WESTPAC deployment since recommissioning, arriving at Subic Bay Naval Base, Philippine Islands 14 days later. After six months in the western Pacific, stationed off the coast of Vietnam, Reeves sailed into port at Pearl Harbor on 17 March 1973.

She remained in the Hawaiian Islands into 1980. She was reclassified a guided missile cruiser (CG-24), on 30 June 1975. Reeves, after a period of dry-dock and training exercises in the mid-Pacific from after October 1977, deployed to the Strait of Hormuz in late January 1980 as a response to the embassy hostage situation with Iran of November the year prior.

=== The 1980s ===
USS Reeves arrived at Yokosuka, Japan on 14 August 1980 to change homeports with USS Worden (CG-18), and the crew transfer taking place on 19 August 1980, with 119 Reeves crew moving on board USS Worden for the trip to USS Worden's new homeport of Pearl Harbor, Hawaii, while 104 Worden crewmen transferred to USS Reeves to remain in Japan.

During most of the 1980s, Reeves was forward deployed to the WESTPAC and homeported in Yokosuka. During that time, she served as the AAW picket for Battle Group Alpha centered around Midway. Her nickname during that time was, "the Only Cruiser in Town".

From 24 February to 5 June 1981 USS Reeves, under the command of Captain James White Egerton USN, deployed with Battle Group Alpha on a Westpac/Indian Ocean Cruise. From 6 to 11 May 1981, USS Reeves and Battle Group Alpha docked at Perth/Fremantle, Western Australia for R&R after exercising with the Royal Australian Navy's aircraft carrier group centered on HMAS Melbourne.

In March 1986, she participated in a Team Spirit exercise off the coast of the Republic of Korea. Later that year, Reeves conducted REFTRA in the Philippines which was quickly followed her involvement in special operations (SPECOPS). SPECOPS consisted of conducting surveillance operations on the Soviet aircraft carrier Minsk off the coast of Vladivostok, which was home to the Soviet Pacific Fleet. During this operation, Reeves blasted either the Bruce Springsteen song "Born in the U.S.A." or Jefferson Starship's "Layin' It on the Line" over the ship's 1MC when in the proximity of Soviet naval vessels.

On 5 November 1986, Reeves led USS Rentz and USS Oldendorf into the harbor of Qingdao (Tsing Tao), the People's Republic of China (PRC) for a historic six-day port visit. This would be the first time that U.S. Navy vessels had moored in China since the repair ship USS Dixie departed in 1949 in the face of the communist advance which forced the evacuation of Americans from China. The visit was hosted by soldiers and sailors of the Chinese People's Liberation Army Navy (PLAN).

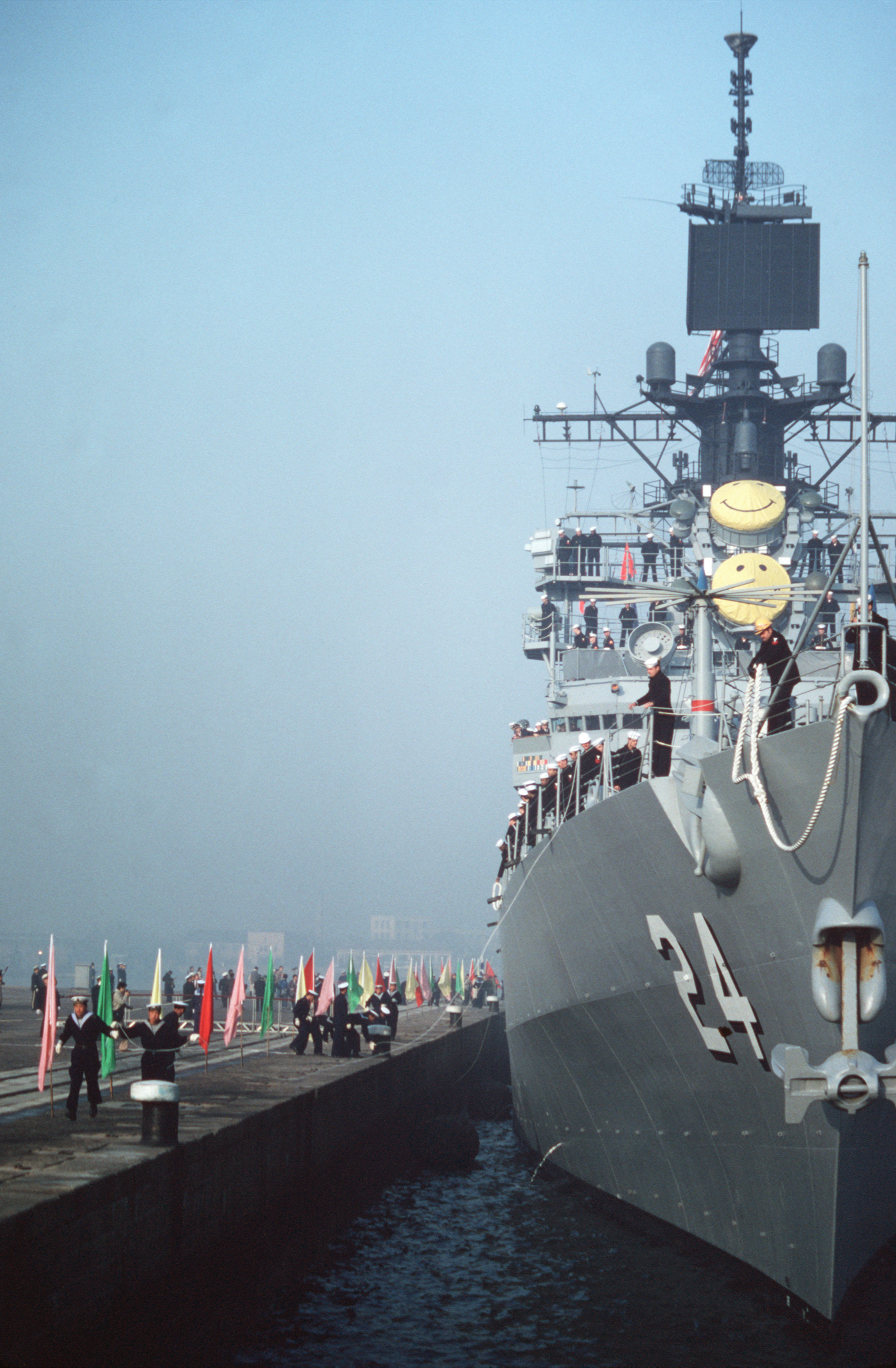
Reeves is the first U.S. Navy ship to visit China in 40 years. (1986)

During the port call hundreds of Navy men took advantage of several tours, arranged by their Chinese hosts, that included stops at Qingdao's carpet, embroidery, jade and shell factories. Others made it a point to sample the beer at the city's world-renowned Tsingtao brewery. A fortunate few were able to leave the port city on tours to Qufu, birthplace of Confucius, the capital city of Beijing, the Forbidden City, and the Great Wall of China.

The port visit was important because it provided visible evidence of growing Sino-American cooperation. Adm. James Lyons, commander of the United States Pacific Fleet, was embarked in Reeves during the visit. Shortly after arriving in Qingdao, he said there are "three pillars" in the US-China military relationship; high level visits, military exchanges and a limited amount of military technology cooperation. "I see this port visit as strengthening all three pillars," he said.

Throughout their stay, the crews of the visiting ships held lectures and discussion sessions on Navy shipboard organization, management, training, propulsion, logistics and weapons systems for their Chinese hosts. At the time such navy-to-navy orientations were conducted with many countries. However, this was the Navy's first opportunity for such an exchange with China.

During May 1987, Reeves found herself involved with yet another Team Spirit exercise. Reeves was deployed to the Persian Gulf from July to September 1987 where she participated in the first of nine Operation Earnest Will tanker reflagging operations beginning on 23 July. Her primary duty was to escort commercial vessels through the Strait of Hormuz. In March 1988 she was involved again with the Team Spirit exercises.

On 26 June 1989, Reeves and the destroyer USS Fife rescued 92 Vietnamese refugees in the South China Sea, about 320 miles (510 km) southwest of the Philippines. The refugees were pulled from their sinking vessel and provided with medical assistance and other care before being delivered to a United Nations refugee organization in Thailand a week later.

On 30 October 1989 an F/A-18 Hornet aircraft from USS Midway mistakenly dropped a 500-pound general-purpose bomb on the deck of Reeves during training exercises in the Indian Ocean, creating a 5-foot (1.5 m) hole in the bow through the line locker one compartment forward of the fore missile house, sparking small fires, sending shrapnel back to the fantail and injuring five sailors. Reeves was 32 miles (51 km) south of Diego Garcia at the time of the incident.

=== Fate ===
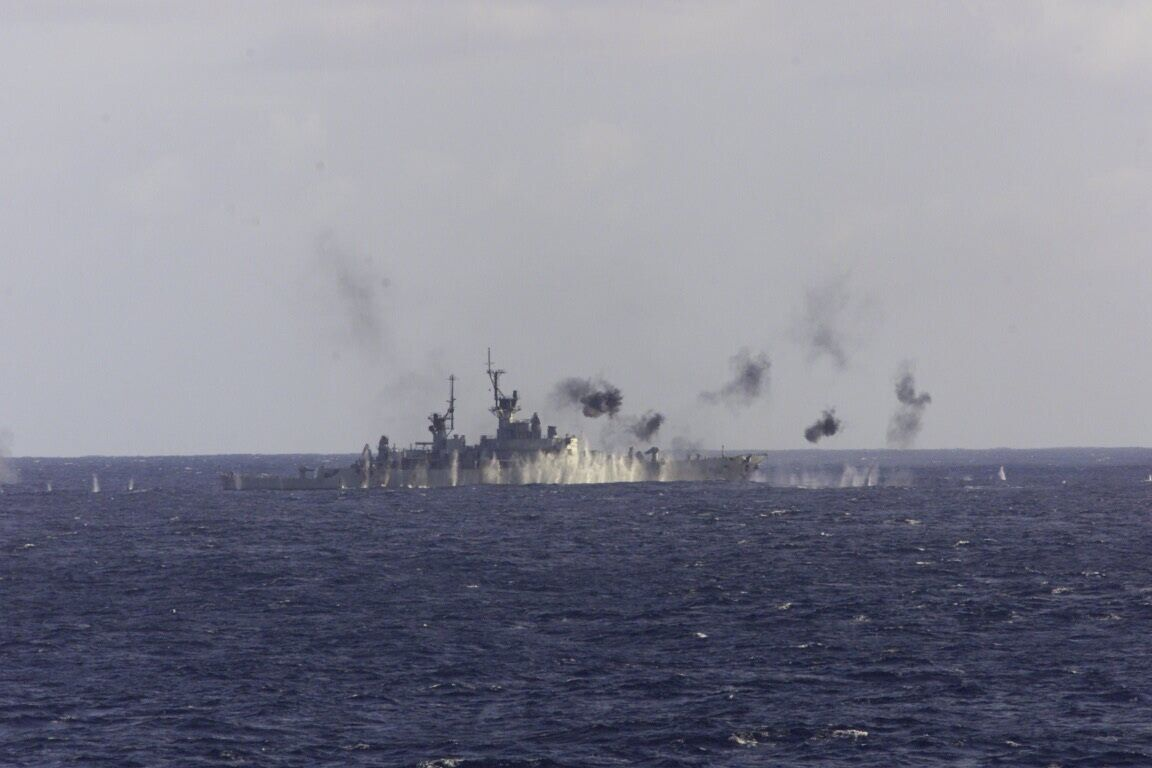
Reeves takes the first hits from bombs, missiles and shells. (2001)

Reeves was decommissioned on 12 November 1993, stored at the Naval Inactive Ship Maintenance Facility (NISMF), Pearl Harbor. She was ultimately used as a target ship on 31 May 2001 during a sink exercise (SINKEX) off the coast of Queensland, Australia during a joint U.S. and Australian naval exercise. Her final resting place is 26°26′53.0″S 155°24′27.0″E where she lies at a depth of 2,541 fathoms (4,647 m; 15,246 ft).

== Awards ==
Reeves earned three battle stars for Vietnam service.

- Combat Action Ribbon, 01-Jul-1967 to 02-Jul-1967
- Navy Unit Commendation, 15-Jun-1966 to 26-Jul-1968
- Meritorious Unit Commendation, 27-Jul-1982 to 01-May-1984 and as a part of "Battle group A" 08-Sep-1988 to 11-Dec-1989
- Battle E, 01-Jul-1974 to 01-Apr-1976, 01-Jan-1979 to 30-Jun-1980, 01-Jul-1983 to 31-Dec-1984
- Navy Expeditionary Medal, 15-Feb-1980 to 05-May-1980 (Iran/Indian Ocean), 17-Mar-1981 to 19-May-1981 (Iran/Indian Ocean), 01-Jul-1987 to 23-Jul-1987
- National Defense Service Medal (2 stars)
- Armed Forces Expeditionary Medal, 07-May-1965 to 28-Oct-1965 (Vietnam), 24-Jul-1987 to 26-Sep-1987 (Persian Gulf),15-Sep-1989 to 24-Oct-1989 (Persian Gulf)
- Vietnam Service Medal
- Humanitarian Services Medal, 19-Sep-1981
- Sea Service Deployment Ribbon
- Navy Overseas Service Ribbon
- Republic of Vietnam Campaign Medal

== Reclassification from DLG to CG ==
In 1975, the "double-ender" Leahy-class guided missile destroyer leaders (DLG) were reclassified as guided missile cruisers (CG), as were other similar ships. The class was given an AAW upgrade during the late-1960s and early 1970s, with Terrier launchers modified to fire Terrier or Standard SM-1ER missiles. The 3"/50 guns were replaced by Harpoon missile launcher, the Terrier launchers were upgraded to fire the Standard SM-2ER missile, and 2 Phalanx CIWS canisters were added. All were upgraded under the late-1980s New Threat Upgrade (NTU) program, which included combat system capability improvements to the ship's Air Search Radars (AN/SPS-48E and AN/SPS-49), Fire Control Radars (AN/SPG-55B), and Combat Direction System (CDS). These improvements provided an accurate means of coordinating the engagement of multiple air targets with SM-2 Extended Range missiles. During the NTU overhaul, all spaces were renovated, berthing and food service areas were refurbished, and the engineering plant was fully overhauled.

=== Electronics ===
- Combat Information Processing
  - Naval Tactical Data System (NTDS)
- Communication
  - OE-82 satellite communication antenna
  - SSR-1 receiver
  - 3x WSC-3 transceivers
- Fire Control
  - SAM 4x Mk 76 Terrier FCS
  - ASW Mk 114
- Weapons Direction System
  - Mk 14 WDS

== Role ==
Modern guided missile cruisers, such as Reeves, performed primarily in a Battle Force role. These ships were multi-mission (AAW – anti-air warfare, ASW – anti-surface warfare, ASUW – anti-submarine warfare) surface combatants capable of supporting carrier or battleship battle groups, amphibious forces, or of operating independently and as flagships of surface action groups. Due to their extensive combat capability, these ships were designated as Battle Force Capable (BFC) units.

== Photo galleries ==
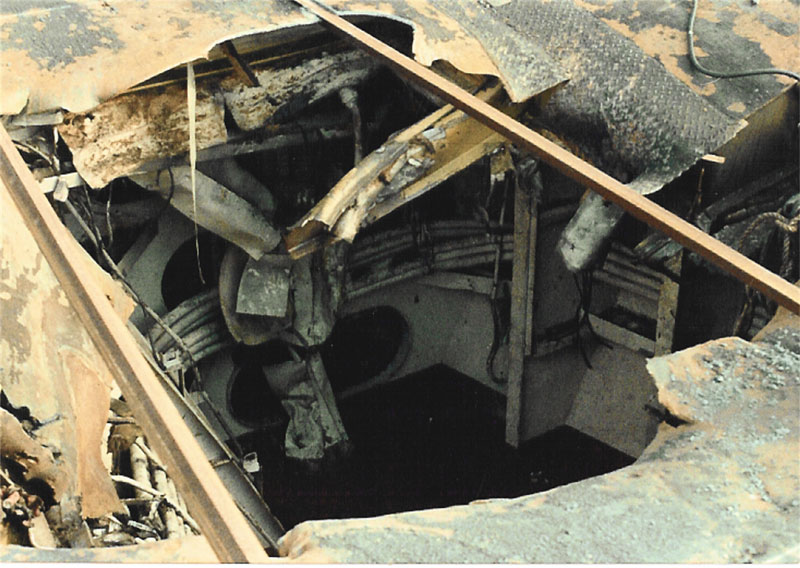
Close up of the damage sustained by Reeves from a 500-pound bomb. (1989)

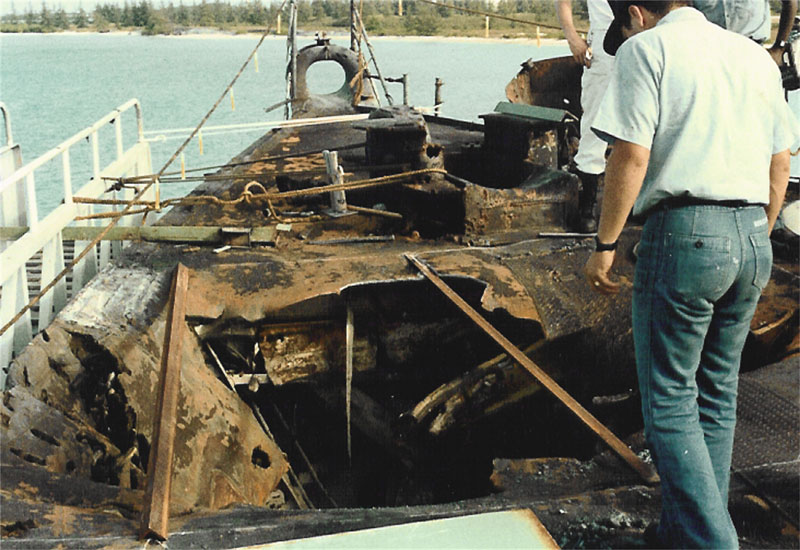
Another view of the damage to Reeves from a 500-pound bomb. (1989)

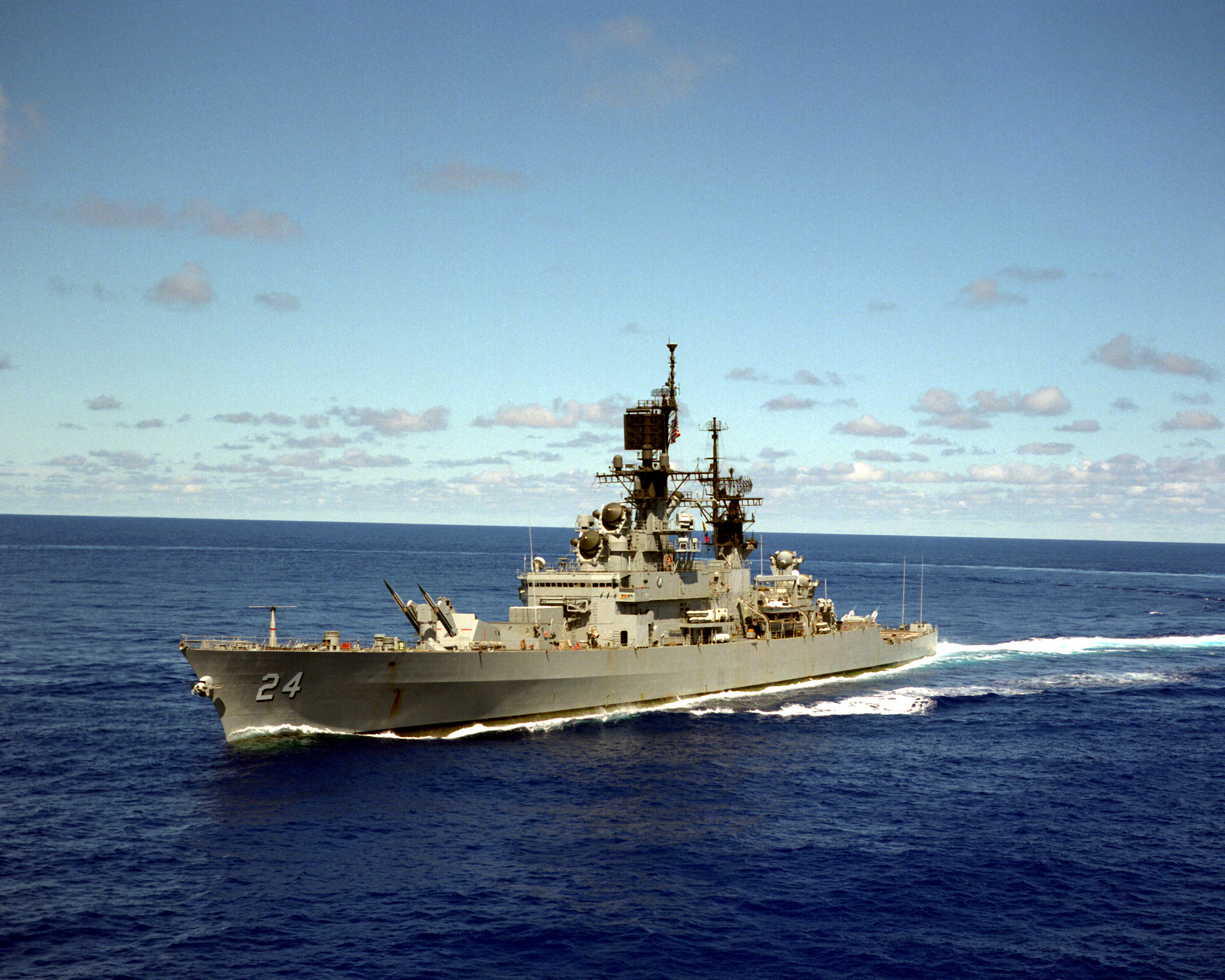
A port bow view of Reeves. (1991)

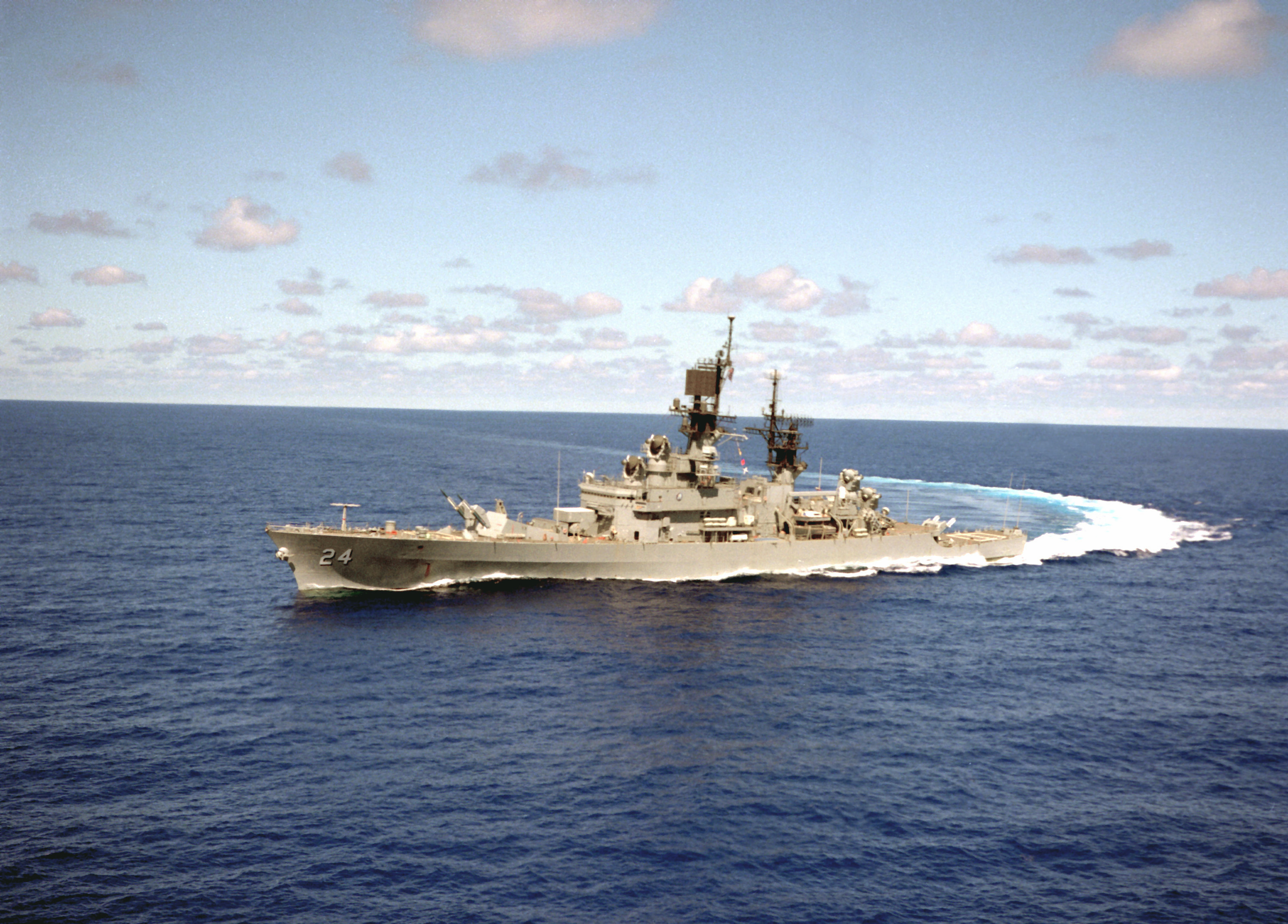
Reeves executing a high speed starboard turn. (1991)

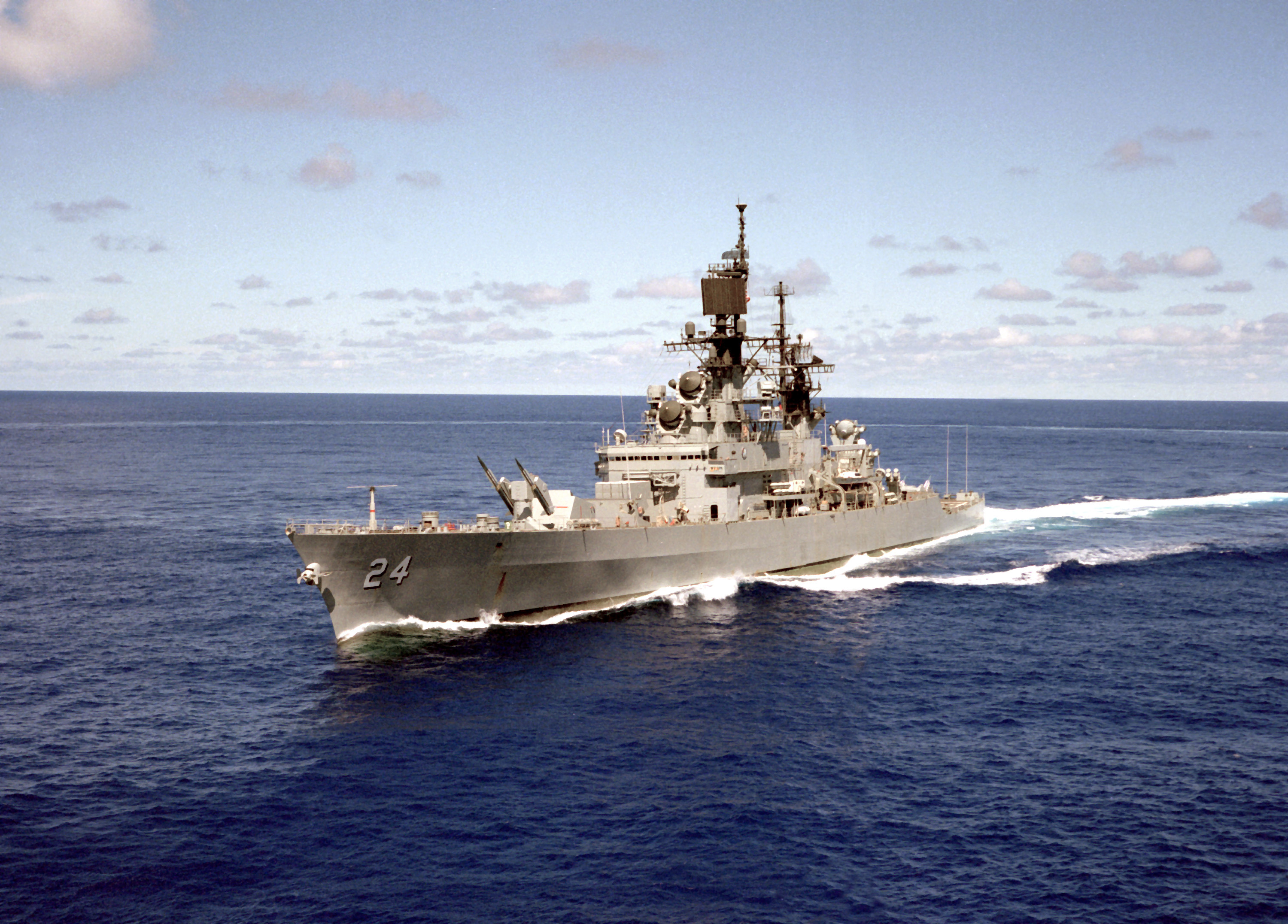
A port bow view of Reeves. (1991)

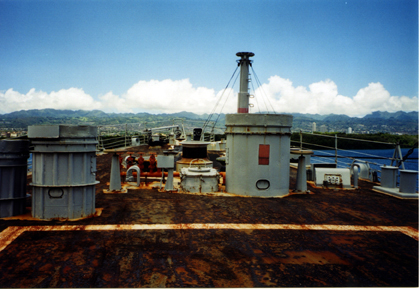
Looking over Reeves's forecastle at Pearl Harbor. (Late 1990s)

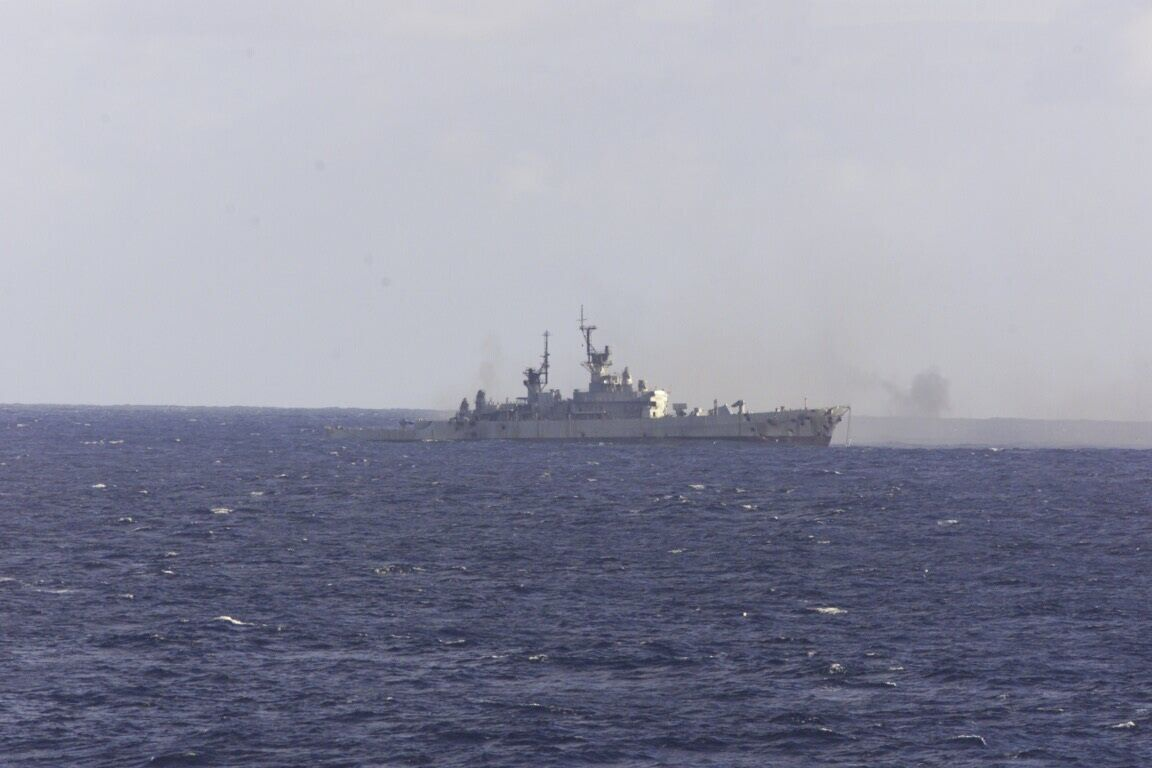
Reeves shows the extensive damage that will lead to her sinking. (2001)
