= USS Harry E. Yarnell =

Leahy-class guided missile cruiser

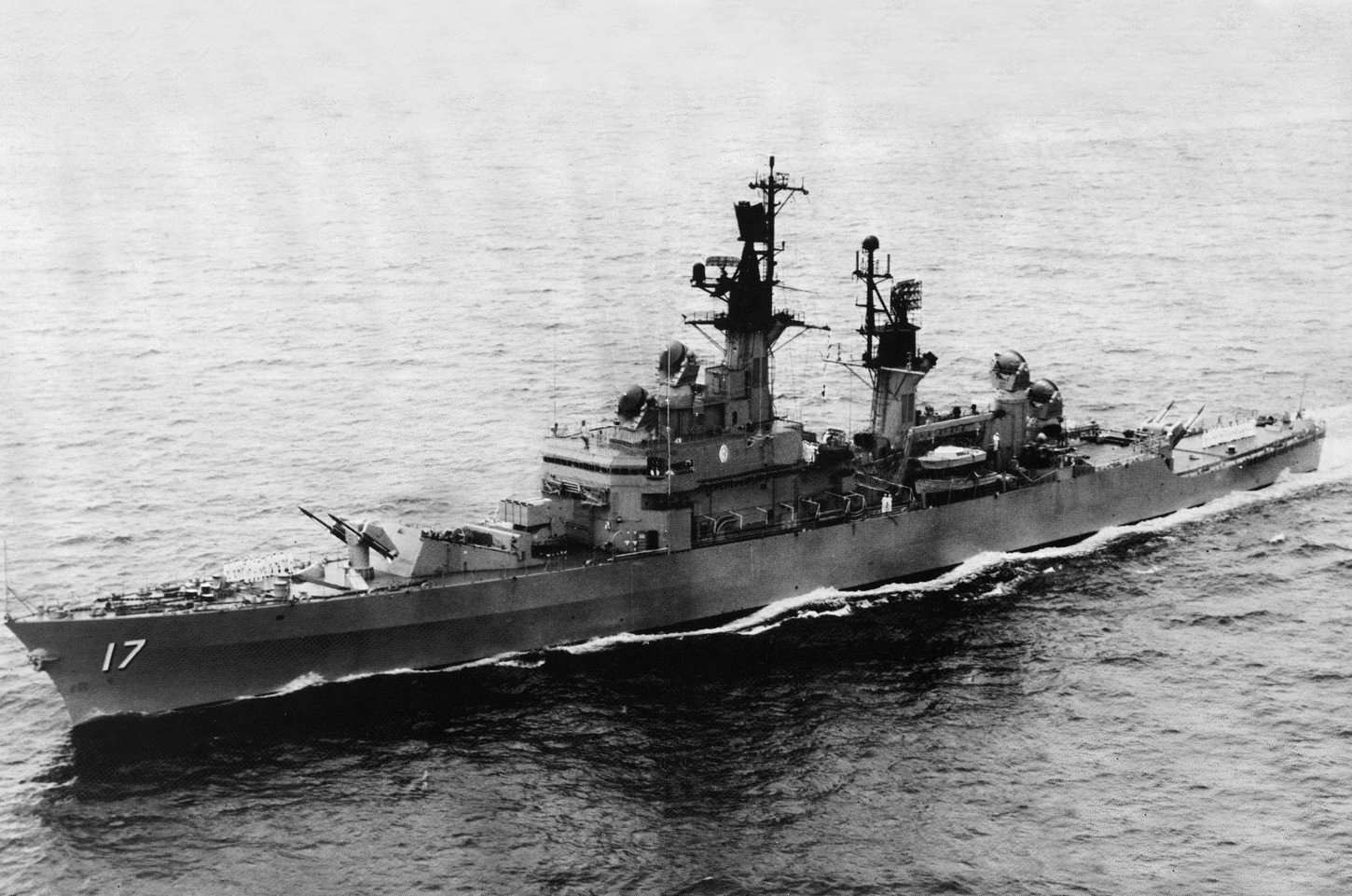
- USS Harry E. Yarnell in 1967

History

United States
- Name: Harry E. Yarnell
- Namesake: Harry E. Yarnell
- Ordered: 11 July 1958
- Builder: Bath Iron Works, Bath, Maine
- Laid down: 31 May 1960
- Launched: 9 December 1961
- Sponsored by: Mrs. Philip Yarnell
- Acquired: 25 January 1963
- Commissioned: 2 February 1963
- Decommissioned: 20 October 1993
- Reclassified: CG-17 on 30 June 1975
- Stricken: 29 October 1993
- Fate: Sold for scrap. Scrapping completed 17 April 2002
- Badge

General characteristics
- Class & type: Leahy class cruiser
- Displacement: 7,800 tons full load
- Length: 547 ft (167 m)
- Beam: 55 ft (17 m)
- Draft: 25 ft (7.6 m)
- Propulsion: Steam turbines, 4 1200 psi boilers, 85,000 hp, 2 shafts
- Speed: 30+ knots
- Complement: 395
- Armament: 2 Mk 10 Missile Systems [Mod 5 fwd][Mod 6 aft] Terrier (80 missiles total), 1 ASROC, 2 dual 3 in (76 mm)/50 guns, 6 12.75 in. torpedo tubes

USS Harry E. Yarnell (DLG/CG-17) was a Leahy-class guided missile cruiser of the United States Navy. Named in honor of Admiral Harry E. Yarnell, she was originally classified as a "destroyer leader" or frigate, in 1975 she was redesignated a cruiser in the Navy's ship reclassification. She was the second of the "double-end" Leahy-class guided missile frigates to join the fleet.

== Construction ==
Harry E. Yarnell was launched 9 December 1961 by the Bath Iron Works, Bath, Maine; sponsored by Mrs. Philip Yarnell, widow of Admiral Yarnell; and commissioned 2 February 1963 at the Boston Naval Shipyard.

== History ==
Harry E. Yarnell was equipped with RIM-2 Terrier surface-to-air missile launching rails both fore and aft and ASROC anti-submarine missiles, as well as more conventional torpedo tubes and guns. The new ship was fitted out at Boston and began sea trials. While out on trials, Yarnell was diverted on 10 April 1963 to search for USS Thresher (SSN-593), the nuclear submarine later found on the bottom some 8,000 feet down. Quartering the area where the sub was last reported, the guided missile frigate found an oil slick and some debris but could not contact the lost submarine.

On her way to her new home base, Naval Station Norfolk, on 23 April, Harry E. Yarnell passed and photographed several Soviet "merchant" ships. The next few months were spent conducting training for shakedown and missile qualification. Designated to carry out standardization trials for her class as well as special acoustical tests, Yarnell spent 28 October–26 November in the Caribbean operating out of Guantanamo Bay and then returned to Norfolk.

Yarnell continued operating in the Virginia Capes area and the Caribbean until departing from Norfolk on 8 September 1964 for her first Atlantic crossing. NATO ASW exercises en route took the guided missile frigate far north, and she crossed the Arctic Circle on 21 September. She visited Amsterdam en route to the Mediterranean, where she remained until returning to Norfolk in February 1965.

On her next Mediterranean deployment, which began 8 October, she transited the Dardanelles on 3 January 1966 and entered the Black Sea to operate close to the Soviet Union before returning to Norfolk in March. After NATO exercises in the North Atlantic, Harry E. Yarnell received the battle efficiency "E" for the preceding year. She also won the 1966 Marjorie Sterrett Battleship Fund Award for the Atlantic Fleet.

Operations in the Gulf of Mexico and Caribbean brought the ship and her crew to a high degree of readiness before she sailed for her 3rd Mediterranean deployment early in 1967. She cruised the Mediterranean until returning to Norfolk in May. At mid-year she operated in the North Atlantic.

After the upgrade in Bath, Maine, in 1969, the Yarnell made her way to Boston Naval Shipyard. The Yarnell was given a new crew and recommissioned for service in Boston. The Yarnell was then assigned to Naval Station Newport. A year of testing all the new systems and the Yarnell set sail in July, 1970 on a UNITAS cruise for exercises with the naval forces of South American countries. Following departure from Newport and an overnight visit at Dam Neck, VA, Yarnell sailed to San Juan, Puerto Rico to pick up the admiral for the cruise. The Yarnell visited Caracas, Venezuela; and Salvador, Rio de Janeiro (twice) and São Paulo, Brazil. A scheduled visit to Montevideo, Uruguay was cancelled due to political activity there, so Yarnell returned to Rio de Janeiro for a second visit. Following a stop in Comodoro Rivadavia, Argentina to take on supplies, Yarnell proceeded through the Magellan Straits and the Chilean Waterway into the Pacific Ocean, where stops were made in Chile, Peru, Ecuador, and Panama before going through the Panama Canal and returning to Newport via San Juan and St. Thomas, U.S. Virgin Islands.

In late 1972, the Yarnell was again deployed to the Mediterranean. On the way across the Atlantic a helicopter from a Russian cruiser flew around the Yarnell taking many photographs. The Yarnell was ordered to accompany the Russia submarines from the Strait of Gibraltar to the Black Sea. Yarnell made port visits at Naples, Genoa, and Venice, Italy; Nice, France; Mallorca, Valencia and Barcelona, Spain; and Athens, Corfu, Rhodes, and Kavalla; Greece.

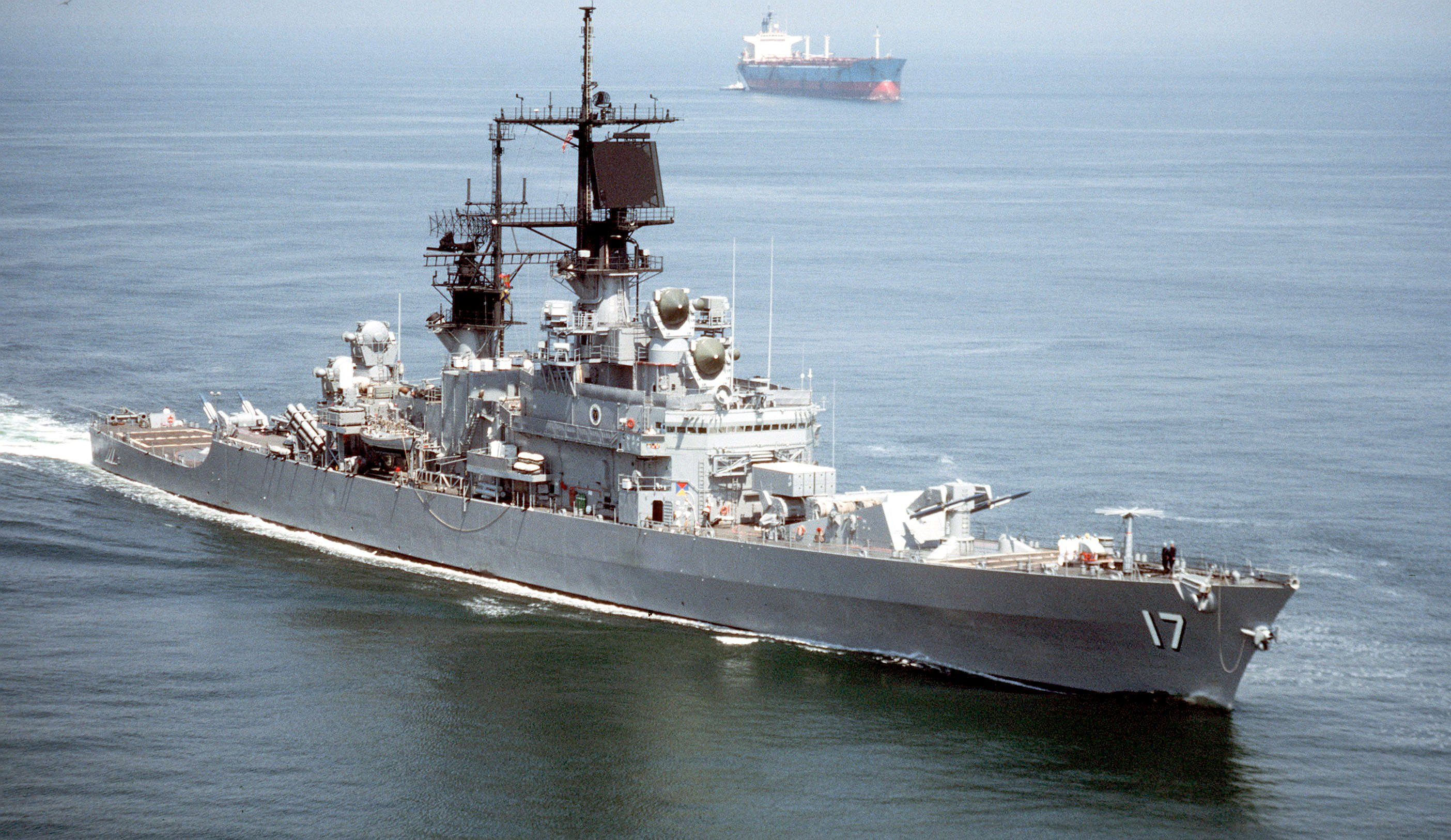
USS Harry E. Yarnell in 1990.

Yarnell returned to the Mediterranean in August 1973. En route she visited Lisbon, Portugal, then took part in Exercise Quickshave off the coasts of France, England and Portugal, followed by turnover in Rota with the USS Dale. Yarnell then deployed to La Palma, followed by Western Med operations as a picket with a short return afterward, to Palma. Group Operations off Crete along with an ORE, were followed by a trip to Athens. Further visits to Barcelona and Malaga occurred before turnover in Rota to USS Leahy on 14 January, Yarnell returning to Newport on 24 January 1974. After a short period of local operations, the Yarnell entered Philadelphia Naval Shipyard for a one-year overhaul. Completion of overhaul also included a trip to New York, during which time she briefly ran aground, before ammunition load-out at Naval Weapons Station Earle, and a Home Port change to Norfolk. Refresher Training at Guantanamo Bay Naval Base, Cuba, with a visit over 4 July to Port-au-Prince, Haiti, followed by local operations off Virginia.

The entire Leahy class was given an AAW upgrade during the late-1970s and early 1980s. The 3/50s were replaced by 8 RGM-84 Harpoon missiles, the Terrier launchers were upgraded to fire the Standard missile, and 2 Phalanx CIWS were added. All were upgraded under the late-1980s NTU program. This included new radars, a new combat system, new fire control systems, and upgraded missiles and missile launchers.

On 19 November 1980 Yarnell, under the command of Captain Howard F. Burdick Jr, sailed with the USS Independence and her battle group to the Arabian Sea/Indian Ocean, during which the ship made port calls at Mombasa, Kenya and Perth and Fremantle, Australia from 3–7 February 1981. The Yarnell returned home to Norfolk Naval Base, VA, on 10 June 1981.

In late June 1990, Rear Admiral Thomas D. Paulson, Commander Cruiser-Destroyer Group Two, led the Yarnell and USS Kauffman to visit Poland in conjunction with BALTOPS '90, a U.S. Naval Forces Europe-hosted international naval exercise in the Baltic Sea. Their port call at Gdynia was the first visit by United States Navy vessels to Poland since 1927.

== Fate ==
Harry E. Yarnell was decommissioned on 20 October 1993, and stricken on 29 October 1993. She was sold on 14 April 1995 for scrapping at Quonset Point, Rhode Island, but the scrap contract was terminated on 1 December 1996 (scrapping 10% complete), and the hulk returned to Philadelphia for storage. Scrapping was ultimately completed in April 2002.
