= USS Halsey (DLG-23) =

Leahy-class guided missile cruiser of the United States Navy

USS Halsey (CG-23)
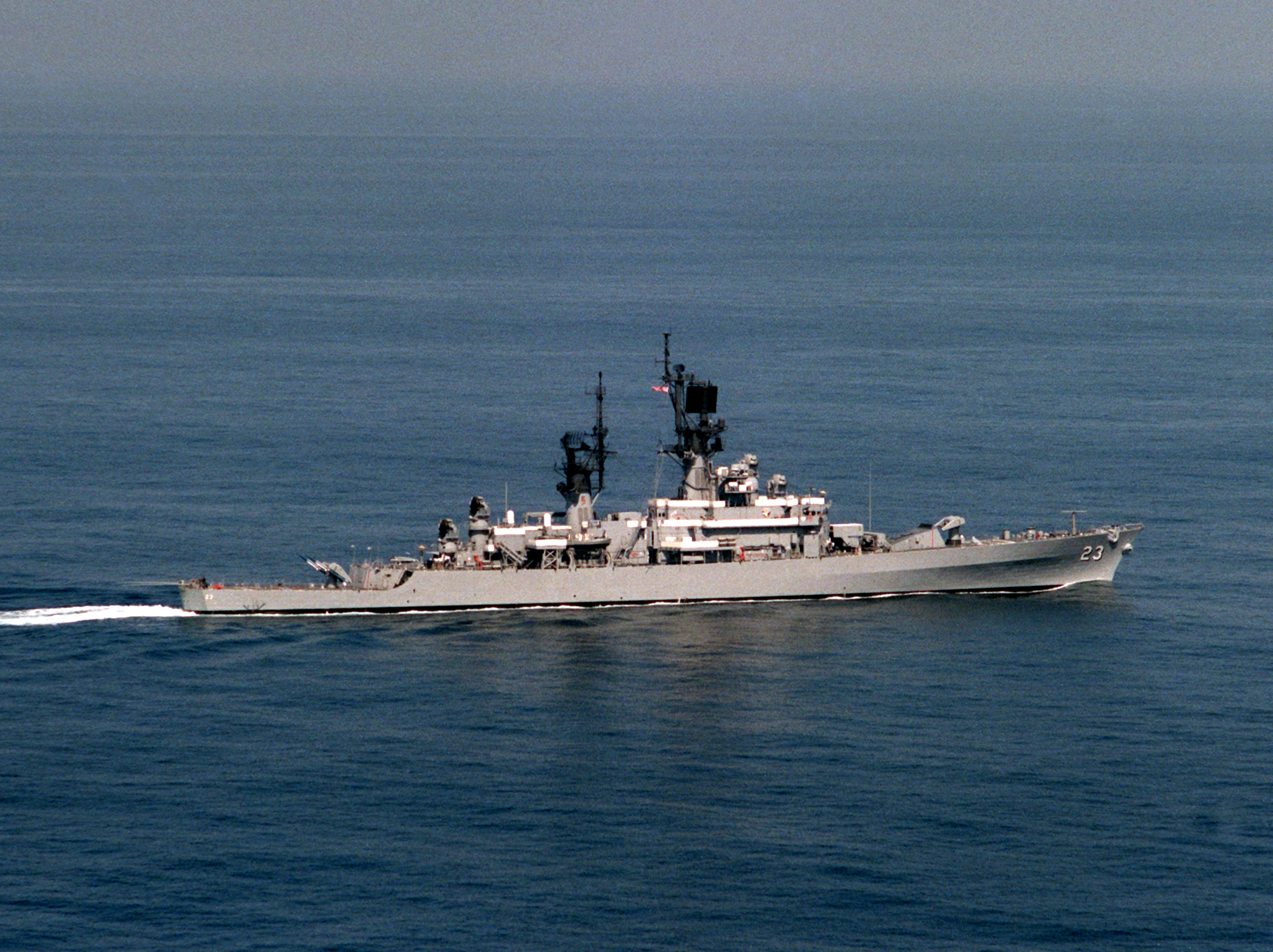
- USS Halsey (CG-23)

History

United States
- Name: Halsey
- Namesake: William Halsey, Jr.
- Builder: San Francisco Naval Shipyard
- Laid down: 26 August 1960
- Launched: 15 January 1962
- Sponsored by: Margaret Denham and Jane Halsey
- Commissioned: 20 July 1963
- Decommissioned: 28 January 1994
- Reclassified: Guided-missile cruiser, 30 June 1975
- Stricken: 28 January 1994
- Identification: DLG-23/CG-23
- Fate: Sold for scrap to International Shipbreaking LTD, Brownsville, Texas. Scrapping completed 30 November 2003
- Badge

General characteristics
- Class & type: Leahy-class cruiser
- Displacement: 7,903 tons
- Length: 533 ft (162 m)
- Beam: 53 ft (16 m)
- Draft: 24 ft 6 in (7.47 m)
- Propulsion: 2 × Allis-Chalmers steam turbines providing 85,000 shp (63 MW); 2 shafts; 4 × Foster-Wheeler boilers
- Speed: 32 kn (59 km/h; 37 mph)
- Range: 8,000 nmi (15,000 km; 9,200 mi) at 20 kn (37 km/h; 23 mph)
- Complement: 400 officers and enlisted
- Sensors & processing systems: AN/SPS-39 followed by AN/SPS-48 3D air search radar; AN/SPS-43 followed by AN/SPS-49 2D air search radar; AN/SPS-10 surface search radar; AN/SPG-55 missile fire control radar; AN/SQS-23 bow mounted sonar
- Electronic warfare & decoys: AN/SLQ-32; Mark 36 SRBOC
- Armament: 2 × Mark 10 missile launcher for RIM-2 Terrier missiles; 1 × 8-cell RUR-5 ASROC antisubmarine launcher; 2 x twin 76 mm (3.0 in) guns (replaced by quad Harpoon missiles during 1980s); 2 × Mark 32 triple 12.75 in (324 mm) torpedo tubes; 2 × Phalanx CIWS

The USS Halsey (DLG-23, later CG-23) was a Leahy-class guided missile cruiser of the United States Navy named in honor of Fleet Admiral William Halsey. Originally called a destroyer leader or frigate (DLG-23), on 30 June 1975 she was redesignated a cruiser (CG-23) in the U.S. Navy's ship reclassification.

== Operations testing ==
Halsey was launched on 15 January 1962 at San Francisco Naval Shipyard, having been sponsored by late Admiral Halsey's, for whom the ship is named after, granddaughters Margaret Denham and Jane Halsey. She was then commissioned on 20 July 1963. Halsey departed from San Francisco on 25 November 1963 for the Bangor Submarine Base in the Hood Canal for testing. She was then sent to San Diego, arriving on 11 December.

Halsey was assigned to Destroyer Squadron 7 and participated in a special sea power demonstration for the Secretary of the Navy. She then went on to conduct weapons qualification trials from January to February 1964 and performed a shakedown cruise over the next two months. She returned to the San Francisco Naval Shipyard on 15 May 1964 and concluded her post-shakedown on 17 July 1964.

== Active service ==
During her first years of active service, Halsey experimented with a unique operations system which combined the responsibilities of the CIC with all weapons systems, and also involved separate hull and communications administrations departments.

On 2 July 1966, Halsey left San Diego for Subic Bay, Philippines, where she performed ASW operations and air-sea rescue missions in the South China Sea. During this period, Halsey rescued some 16 airmen while cruising in the Gulf of Tonkin.

On 5 December, the frigate departed from Yokosuka, Japan, arriving in San Diego on 21 December.

1967 was spent in training cruises off the West Coast, but Halsey underwent overhaul in April, rejoining training exercises in September.

On 15 April 1968, Halsey was involved in an air-sea rescue mission off the coast of North Vietnam, with her Sea King helicopter helping to rescue 4 downed airmen.

Halsey was reclassified as a guided-missile cruiser and redesignated CG-23 on 30 June 1975.

For the rest of Halsey's career, she spent her time participating in regular operations in the West Pacific and Indian Ocean. She was involved in Operations Desert Storm and Desert Shield in the Gulf War.

== Fate ==
Halsey was decommissioned and struck from the Naval Vessel Register in January 1994. She was scrapped in 2003.
