= USS Gridley (DLG-21) =

US naval vessel (1963–1994)

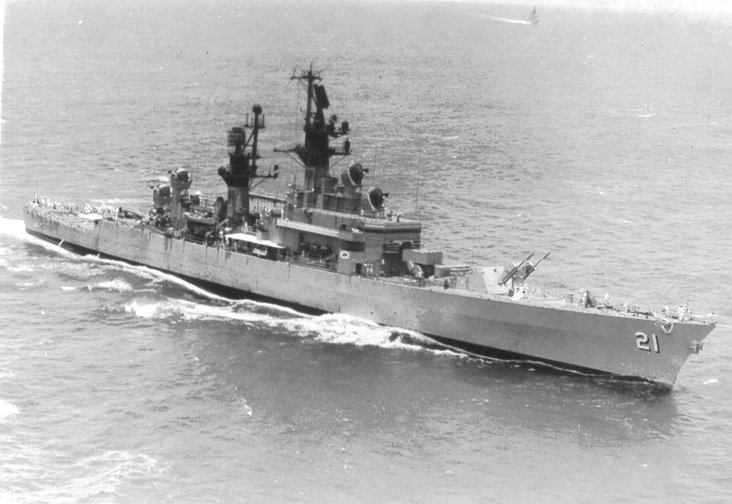
- USS Gridley (CG-21)

History

United States
- Name: Gridley
- Namesake: Charles Vernon Gridley
- Builder: Puget Sound Bridge and Drydock Company, Seattle, Washington
- Laid down: 15 July 1960
- Launched: 31 July 1961
- Commissioned: 25 May 1963
- Decommissioned: 10 September 1968
- Recommissioned: 17 January 1970
- Decommissioned: 21 January 1994
- Reclassified: CG-21 on 30 June 1975
- Stricken: 21 January 1994
- Motto: World's Greatest Cruiser
- Fate: Sold for scrap to International Shipbreaking LTD, Brownsville, TX. 4 October 2003. Reacquired from MARAD 23 January 2004. Scrapping completed on 31 March 2005.
- Badge

General characteristics
- Class & type: Leahy-class cruiser
- Displacement: 7400 tons
- Length: 533 feet
- Beam: 53 feet
- Draft: 26 feet
- Propulsion: 2 × De Laval steam turbines providing 85,000 shp (63 MW); 2 shafts; 4 × Foster-Wheeler boilers
- Speed: 30 knots
- Complement: 373 officers and men
- Sensors & processing systems: AN/SPS-39 followed by AN/SPS-48 3D air search radar; AN/SPS-43 followed by AN/SPS-49 2D air search radar; AN/SPS-10 surface search radar; AN/SPG-55 missile fire control radar; AN/SQS-23 bow mounted sonar
- Electronic warfare & decoys: AN/SLQ-32; Mark 36 SRBOC
- Armament: four 3 in (76 mm)/50 guns (Later replaced by 8 Harpoon anti-ship missiles), two Mk 32 SVTT Mounts with three Mk 46 torpedoes each, four Terrier missile launchers (Later replaced with Standard Missiles), one ASROC launcher, 2 Phalanx CIWS Mounts ('70's era and later)

USS Gridley (DLG-21/CG-21), a Leahy-class guided missile cruiser, was the third ship of the United States Navy to be named after Charles Vernon Gridley, who distinguished himself with Admiral George Dewey's force at the Battle of Manila Bay on 1 May 1898.

Her keel was laid down by the Puget Sound Bridge and Drydock Company of Seattle, Washington. She was launched on 31 July 1961 sponsored by Mrs. Stuart D. Rose, great-granddaughter of Captain Gridley, and commissioned on 25 May 1963.

== 1960s ==
After outfitting at Puget Sound Naval Shipyard in Bremerton, Washington, Gridley made a goodwill visit to British Columbia and then conducted acceptance trials out of her homeport, Long Beach, California. The new cruiser returned to Puget Sound Shipyard from 8 November to 9 December 1963, after which she joined the Pacific Fleet as "planned" flagship of Destroyer Squadron 19.

Following shakedown out of San Diego, California, early in 1964, Gridley departed Long Beach 8 April and steamed via Pearl Harbor to Australia for commemoration of the Battle of the Coral Sea, arriving Adelaide, South Australia, on 5 May. "Gridley" also visited Perth and Geraldton on the western coast of Australia. The frigate next headed for the Philippines, stopping at Subic Bay on 29 May through 31 May, before proceeding to Okinawa on 2 June and Sasebo, Japan, on 8 June.

Heading south once more, she returned to Subic Bay and visited Hong Kong. On 4 August, she got underway for the South China Sea escorting the aircraft carrier USS Constellation to strengthen American naval forces off Vietnam after Communist motor torpedo boats had attacked destroyers USS Maddox and USS Turner Joy (companion members of DESRON-19) in the Gulf of Tonkin. But for a brief visit to Subic Bay, she remained on station serving screening and picket duty, coordinating antiaircraft warfare efforts, and relaying communications. Before she left the fighting zone 6 September, the ship's competent and dedicated service won her the Navy Unit Commendation. She departed Subic Bay on 7 November and reached Long Beach on 21 November.

Gridley operated along the West Coast until heading back to the Western Pacific 10 July 1965. Stopping at Pearl Harbor and Yokosuka en route, she steamed to the South China Sea to support aircraft carriers of the Seventh Fleet as the flattops attacked targets in Vietnam. On four occasions in the next four months, she rescued pilots who ditched at sea. She returned to Yokosuka on 7 December but resumed station in the South China Sea on 22 December to serve as "Tomcat," responsible for checking-in planes returning to their carriers. Early in 1966 she headed for home and reached Long Beach 1 February.

In 1965 Gridley was runner up of the Capt. Edward F. Ney Memorial Award, for the best feeding food ship in the Navy.(Medium afloat class) In 1966, the destroyer leader won the Capt. Edward F. Ney Memorial Award, for the best feeding food ship in the navy (Medium afloat class). In that same time period, a letter of Commendation from the Commander Cruiser Destroyer Force, U.S. Pacific Fleet, to the Gridley Commanding Officer A. M. Sackett, stated, the Gridley won the Battle Efficiency Competition within Destroyer Squadron NINETEEN for the period ending 30 June 1966. The Gridley had also won the Supply Efficiency Award. Gridley operated along the California coast until sailing for the Orient 18 November. She left Subic Bay 2 January 1967 for plane guard duty in the China Sea and the Gulf of Tonkin. After varied duties in the fighting zone, she sailed for Australia en route to the West Coast and arrived Long Beach 8 June to prepare for future action.

On 8 June 1967 Ensign John Kerry reported on board for his first tour of sea duty. His tour ended a year later, on 6 June 1968, when Gridley returned from her deployment.

== 1970s ==
On 20 November 1970, after being re-commissioned having received a major overhaul of radar, sonar and anti-air and anti-submarine warfare weapons systems making Gridley the first ship of her class to be outfitted with NTDS. With stops at Pearl Harbor, Subic Bay, Yokohama, Yokosuka and Sasebo. Served as "shotgun" for the aircraft carriers USS Ranger, USS Constellation and USS Kitty Hawk in the Gulf of Tonkin.

In 1972, Gridley was the first ship of the class to be fitted with digital missile fire control systems providing her with the capability to fire Standard Missile Type 2. Several years later, the 3 in/50s were replaced by 8 AGM-84 Harpoon missiles and 2 Phalanx CIWS were added.

Gridley was reclassified as a guided missile cruiser with hull classification symbol CG-21 on 30 June 1975. That year, she provided air traffic control and on-station support during "Operation Frequent Wind", the evacuation during the collapse of South Vietnam. Gridley was also on-station air traffic controller during the Mayagüez incident. Gridley was based in Subic Bay, Philippines, during the 1975 Westpac. During the 1975 year, Gridley appears to have been part of Cruiser-Destroyer Group 3.

In 1976, Gridley made a Westpac tour. During her trip across the Pacific, Gridley transited the 180th parallel (the International Date Line) at midnight 3 July. Gridley went directly from 3 to 5 July, resulting in her crew being the few Americans to miss the 200th anniversary of Independence Day. (Gridley celebrated the missing 4 July upon crossing the dateline in December, when an extra day is gained.)

During the 1976 Westpac, Gridley was based in Yokosuka, Japan.

On 21 August 1976, Gridley was involved in the fallout of Axe Murder Incident. This involved the murder of two U.S. Army officers by North Korean soldiers. Gridley was in-port in Yokosuka, Japan when this event happened; by the next morning the entire USS Midway battle group was underway and stood off the coast of Korea for nearly a month.

== 1980s ==
In early 1980 Gridley and the frigate USS Barbey escorted the USS Okinawa Battle Group/ 31st MEU from Pearl Harbor as a reserve in what culminated as Operation Eagle Claw, the effort to rescue the Iranian Embassy hostages. These 31st MEU deployments routinely included the Indian Ocean with port calls from Busan to Mombasa to include Diego Garcia.

In 1981 the ship deployed with Battle Group Charlie to the Middle East.

Upon returning to San Diego, California, in March 1982, Gridley was once again operating in Southern California waters, until October when she returned to Long Beach Naval Shipyard for an extensive upgrade and an overhaul of all engineering machinery. More upgrades were made to the ship's fire control and air search radars, sonar system was upgraded from the AN/SQS-23 to the AN/SQQ-23 PAIR, and the Phalanx close-in weapon system was installed during 1982. Gridley returned to the operational fleet in October 1983.

In July 1987 Gridley was part of the USS Ranger battle group, conducting strikes against Iranian oil platforms during Operation Nimble Archer, returning to San Diego in January 1988. The ship then departed San Diego, California for the Persian Gulf on 15 December 1988, operating with the Spruance-class destroyer USS John Young to escort reflagged Kuwaiti oil tankers through the Strait of Hormuz during Operation Earnest Will. While homeward bound, transiting the South China Sea, Gridley rescued Vietnamese refugees sighted in a small boat off of the coast of Vietnam. A Vietnamese-speaking crewman aboard Gridley was able to translate for those rescued, facilitating the process. The crew was awarded the Humanitarian Service Medal for their rescue efforts.

Gridley returned to San Diego in June 1989. On 17 October of that year, the ship's visit to Naval Station, Treasure Island, San Francisco, was interrupted by the 6.9 M_{w} Loma Prieta earthquake that struck the San Francisco Bay area. Gridley's crew provided assistance to victims in San Francisco's severely damaged Marina district, and was awarded the Humanitarian Service Medal for disaster recovery efforts.

== 1990s ==
From February 1990 until March 1991, Gridley received the New Threat Upgrade at Southwest Marine Shipyard in San Diego, California. During the US$55 million overhaul, all engineering, berthing and food service areas were upgraded, and the ship's combat systems were dramatically enhanced. Improvements to the air search radars and Combat Direction System improved the ship's ability to detect and engage multiple air threats with its SM-1ER and SM-2ER surface-to-air missiles.

Following an extensive operational evaluation and qualification phase, Gridley deployed to the Persian Gulf, the ship operated in support of the aircraft carrier USS Independence. Gridley rescued the disabled merchant vessel Adel 11 in the North Arabian Sea in June 1992. When Operation Southern Watch, the enforcement of a "no-fly" zone over southern Iraq, commenced in August, Gridley was the first ship on station off the coast of Kuwait. She provided coastal radar coverage and air-defense protection for ships in the northern Persian Gulf.

Gridley returned to San Diego in October 1992 and was overhauled at the National Steel and Shipbuilding Company from January through April 1993. During that time, the ship was back fitted to accommodate the new SM-2ER block III missile. The modification gave the ship the capability to defeat the sea-skimming cruise missiles which have proliferated worldwide in the 1990s. In July 1993, Gridley fired several of the new missiles on the Pacific Missile Test Center range, scoring three successful hits. That same month, the ship rendezvoused with USS Constellation in Acapulco, Mexico, escorting her back to San Diego, after the carrier's three-year Service Life Extension Program overhaul at the Philadelphia Naval Shipyard.

After a final port visit to San Francisco, in October 1993 Gridley returned to San Diego, where she was decommissioned, stricken from the Naval Vessel Register, and transferred to the Maritime Administration for temporary lay-up on 21 January 1994. She was laid up in the Suisun Bay, California, reserve to await disposal. She was scrapped in 2005.
