= Leahy-class cruiser =

Missile-armed warship

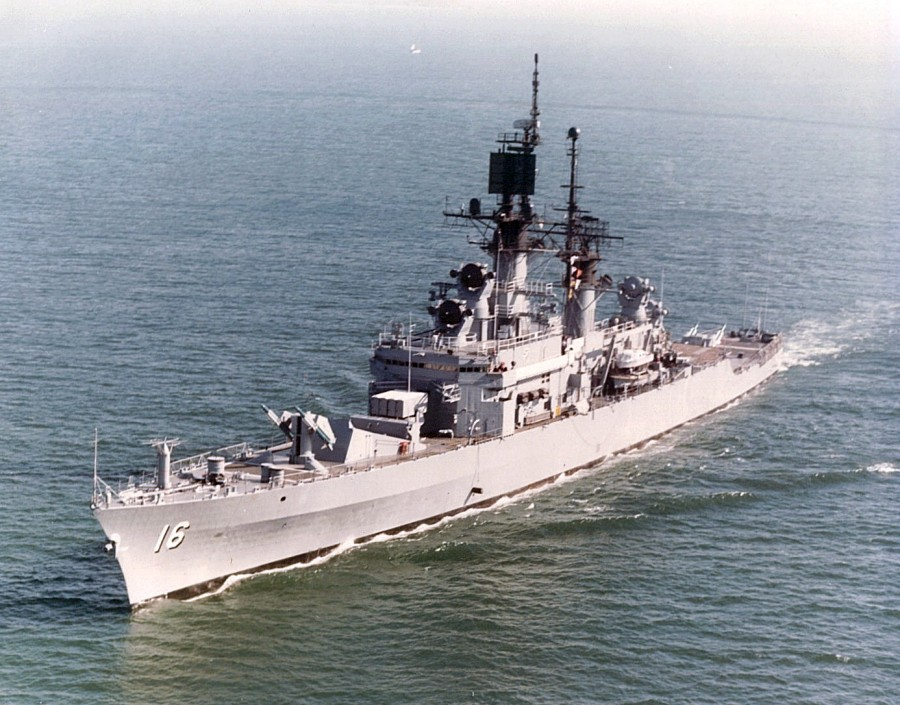
- USS Leahy (CG-16)

Class overview
- Builders: Bath Iron Works, ME (3); New York Shipbuilding, NJ (2); San Francisco Naval Shipyard, CA (1); Lockheed Shipbuilding, WA (1); Puget Sound Naval Shipyard, WA (1); Todd Shipyards, San Pedro, CA (1)
- Operators: United States Navy
- Preceded by: Albany class (as Cruiser) Farragut class (as Destroyer Leader)
- Succeeded by: Belknap class
- Subclasses: Bainbridge class
- Built: 1959–1964
- In commission: 1962–1995
- Completed: 9
- Active: 0
- Retired: 9

General characteristics
- Type: Guided-missile cruiser
- Displacement: 7,800 tons (full load)
- Length: 533 ft (162 m)
- Beam: 55 ft (17 m)
- Draft: 26 ft (7.9 m)
- Propulsion: 2 × steam turbines providing 85,000 shp (63 MW); 2 shafts; 4 × boilers
- Speed: 32 knots (59 km/h; 37 mph)
- Range: 8,000 nautical miles (15,000 km; 9,200 mi) at 20 knots (37 km/h; 23 mph)
- Sensors & processing systems: AN/SPS-39 followed by AN/SPS-48 3D air search radar; AN/SPS-43 followed by AN/SPS-49 2D air search radar; AN/SPS-10 surface search radar; AN/SPG-55 missile fire control radar; AN/SQS-23 bow mounted sonar
- Electronic warfare & decoys: AN/SLQ-32; Mark 36 SRBOC
- Armament: 2 × Mark 10 Terrier SAM; 1 × ASROC ASW system; 4 × 3 in(76 mm)guns (replaced by Harpoon missiles during 1980s); 6 × 12.75 in(324 mm)ASW TT; 2 × Phalanx CIWS

Leahy-class cruisers were a class of guided-missile cruisers built for the United States Navy. They were originally designated as Destroyer Leaders (DLG), but in the 1975 cruiser realignment they were reclassified as guided-missile cruisers (CG).

They were a new "double-ender" class fitted with Terrier (later Standard ER) missile launchers fore and aft, and the first and only frigate class designed without a main gun battery for shore bombardment or ship-vs.-ship engagements—the gun armament was reduced in order to carry a larger missile load. One of the principal missions of these ships, like their predecessors the Farragut class, was to form part of the anti-air and antisubmarine screen for carrier task forces, while also controlling aircraft from the carrier by providing vectors to assigned targets.

The ships carried over the propulsion plant of the Farragut class, fitted into a longer hull designed with a knuckled “hurricane” bow that reduced plunging in a rough sea, thus keeping the forecastle dry as needed to operate the forward missile launcher. Other features included an expanded electrical plant and increased endurance. A major design innovation was the use of "macks"—combined masts and stacks—on which the radars could be mounted without smoke interference.

== Description ==
Designed under project SCB 172, the first three ships were constructed at Bath Iron Works, the next two at New York Shipbuilding Corp, and the rest at Puget Sound Bridge and Dry Dock Company, Todd Shipyards, San Pedro, CA, San Francisco Naval Shipyard and Puget Sound Naval Shipyard.

Modernizations were accomplished between 1967 and 1972 under SCB 244, upgrading air warfare capabilities. Nearly all modernizations were completed at Bath Iron Works, but Leahy received the modernization at Philadelphia Naval Shipyard at a cost of $36.1 million.

All Leahy-class ships were modernized again in the late 1980s New Threat Upgrade program. This program added advanced air search and track radars (AN/SPS-49 and AN/SPS-48E), updated targeting radars (AN/SPG-55), and combat direction systems. The upgrade included massive remodeling of the ship from food service space rehabilitation to a main propulsion system overhaul. Entire systems were removed and replaced, for example the AN/SPS-40 air-search radar was replaced with the AN/SPS-49 air-search radar. The upgrade was also quite expensive and the ships didn't serve much longer after the modification. For example, USS Gridley (CG-21) received NTU in 1991 at a cost of $55 million, but was decommissioned in early 1994.

The Leahy class (and near sisters of the Belknap class) were taken out of service in the early 1990s as part of the Clinton Administration's desire to reduce defense spending in light of reduced tensions with Russia. The entire class was decommissioned between 1993 and 1995, stricken from the naval register, and transferred to the Maritime Administration (MARAD) for disposal.

=== USS Bainbridge ===
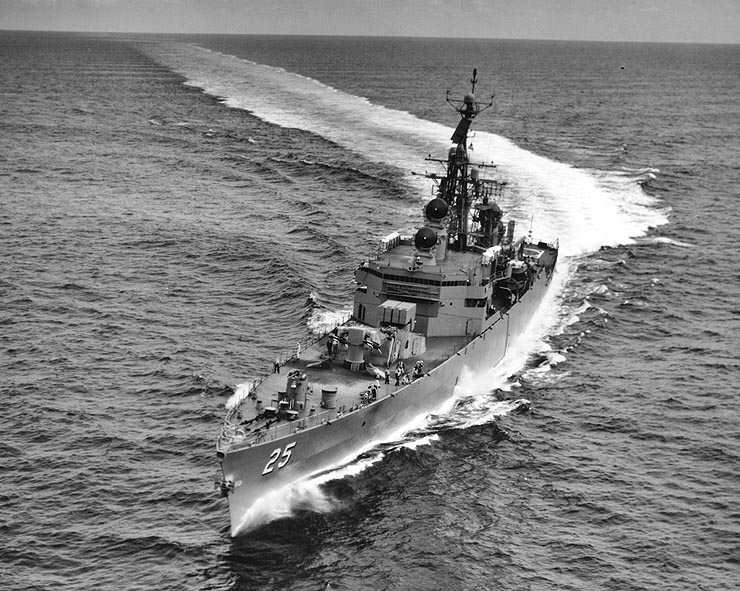
- USS Bainbridge (CGN-25)

Class overview
- Name: Bainbridge class
- Builders: Bethlehem Steel Corporation
- Operators: United States Navy
- Built: 1959–1962
- In commission: 1962–1996
- Completed: 1
- Active: 0
- Retired: 1

General characteristics
- Class & type: Guided missile cruiser
- Displacement: 9100 tons
- Length: 172.1 m (565 ft)
- Beam: 17.6 m (58 ft)
- Draft: 29 ft (8.8 m) (maximum
- Propulsion: 60,000 shp (45,000 kW); 2 G.E. Reactors (D2G), Geared Turbines, 2 screws
- Speed: 34 knots (63 km/h; 39 mph)
- Range: Unlimited
- Complement: 475
- Sensors & processing systems: 1 AN/SPS-10 surface search RADAR; AN/SPS-37 search RADAR; AN/SPS-52 3D air search RADAR; 4 AN/SPG-55 Terrier fire control RADAR; AN/SQS-26 SONAR
- Armament: As Leahy class

USS Bainbridge (CGN-25) was a nuclear-powered development of the Leahy-class. Originally a guided-missile destroyer leader, the class was re-designated guided-missile cruiser in 1975. As with USS Long Beach (CGN-9) and USS Enterprise (CVN-65), Bainbridge was the only member of its single-ship class.

Bainbridge was largely identical to the Leahy class except for the replacement of the conventional design's four 1,200 lb/in^{2} steam boilers with two D2G reactors, and related increases in displacement, length and beam. Bainbridge's engineering department carried 7 officers and 156 enlisted men—respectively 3 and 42 more than a contemporary steam-powered vessel.

The lessons learned on Bainbridge were later adapted to the next nuclear-powered ship, USS Truxtun (CGN-35) and the California and Virginia classes of nuclear-powered cruiser.

== Ships in class ==
Name	Pennant	Builder	Laid Down	Launched	Commissioned	Decommissioned	Fate
Leahy-class conventional cruiser
Leahy	CG-16	Bath Iron Works, Bath	3 December 1959	1 July 1961	4 August 1962	1 October 1993	Broken up at Brownsville, 2005
Harry E. Yarnell	CG-17	Bath Iron Works, Bath	31 May 1960	9 December 1961	2 February 1963	29 October 1993	Broken up at Philadelphia, 2002
Worden	CG-18	Bath Iron Works, Bath	9 September 1961	2 June 1962	3 August 1963	1 October 1993	Sunk as target, 17 June 2000
Dale	CG-19	New York Shipbuilding Corporation, Camden	6 September 1960	28 June 1962	23 November 1963	27 September 1994	Sunk as target, 6 April 2000
Richmond K. Turner	CG-20	New York Shipbuilding Corporation, Camden	9 January 1961	6 April 1963	13 June 1964	13 April 1995	Sunk as target, 9 August 1998
Gridley	CG-21	Lockheed Shipbuilding and Construction Company, Seattle	15 July 1960	31 July 1961	25 May 1963	21 January 1994	Broken up at Brownsville, 2005
England	CG-22	Todd Shipyards, San Pedro	4 October 1960	6 March 1962	7 December 1963	21 January 1994	Broken up at Brownsville, 2004
Halsey	CG-23	San Francisco Naval Shipyard	26 August 1960	15 January 1962	20 July 1963	28 January 1994	Broken up at Brownsville, 2003
Reeves	CG-24	Puget Sound Naval Shipyard, Bremerton	1 July 1960	12 May 1962	15 May 1964	12 November 1993	Sunk as target, 1 June 2001
Bainbridge-class nuclear powered cruiser
Bainbridge	CGN-25	Bethlehem Steel Corporation, Quincy	5 May 1959	15 April 1961	6 October 1962	13 September 1996	Disposed of through Ship-Submarine Recycling Program at Bremerton, 1999

== Gallery ==
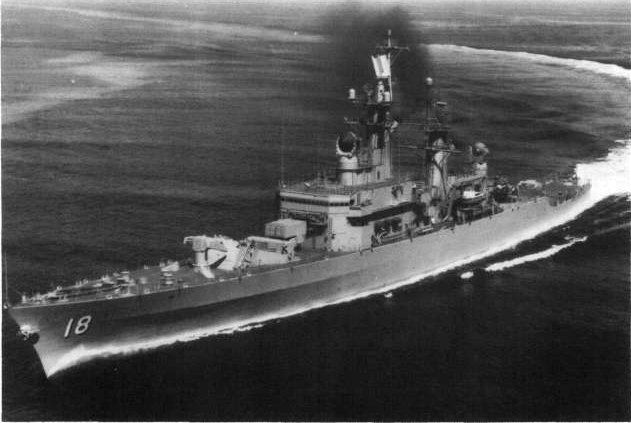
Worden prior to modernization in late 1960s or early 1970s.

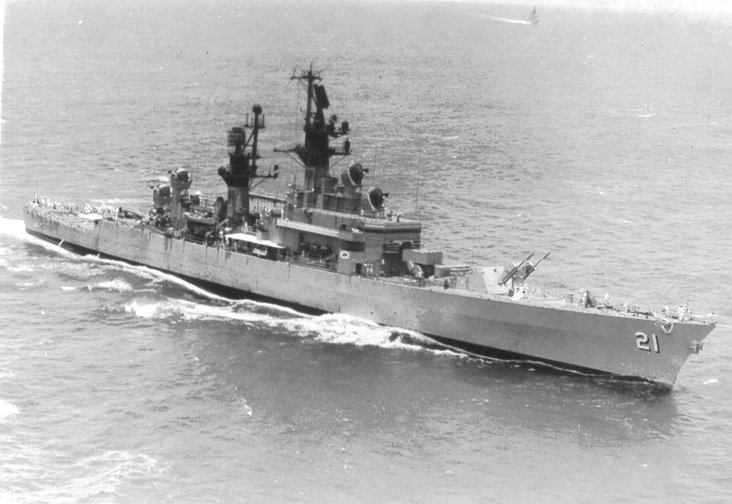
Gridley after modernization, but prior to NTU.

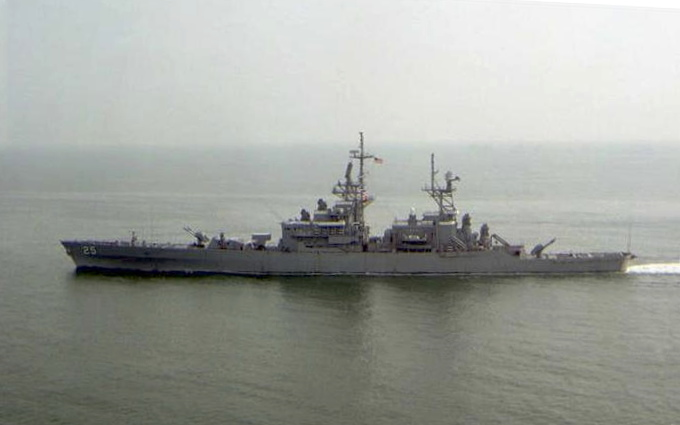
Bainbridge in 1991

== See also ==
- List of United States Navy destroyer leaders
- List of United States Navy cruisers
