= USS Dale (DLG-19) =

United States Navy guided-missile cruiser

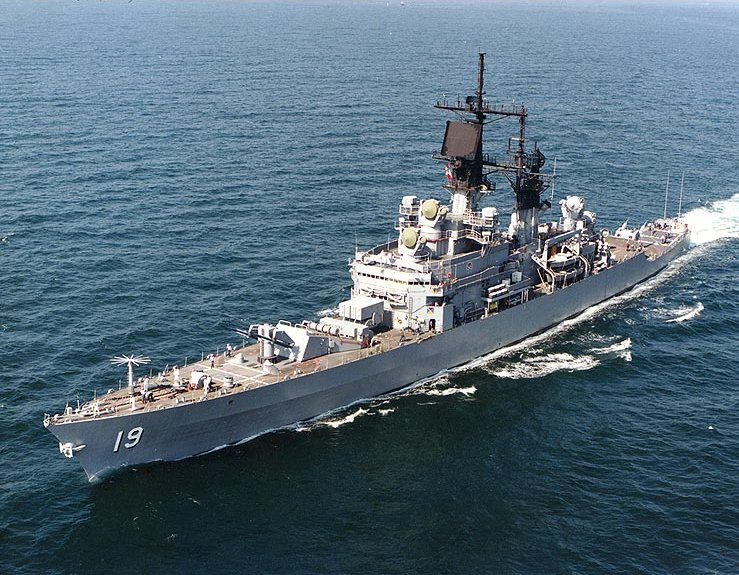
- USS Dale (CG-19) underway, circa the 1980s or early 1990s

History

United States
- Name: Dale
- Namesake: Richard Dale
- Ordered: 7 November 1958
- Laid down: 6 September 1960
- Launched: 28 June 1962
- Sponsored by: Mrs. Daniel J. Flood
- Acquired: 8 November 1963
- Commissioned: 23 November 1963
- Decommissioned: 11 October 1970
- Recommissioned: 12 November 1971
- Decommissioned: 27 September 1994
- Stricken: 27 September 1994
- Fate: Sunk as target 6 April 2000 037° 35' 59.0" North 070° 45' 04.0" West
- Badge

General characteristics
- Class & type: Leahy-class cruiser
- Displacement: 8520 tons (full)
- Length: 533 ft (162 m)
- Beam: 55 ft (17 m)
- Draft: 26 ft (7.9 m)
- Propulsion: 2 shaft; De Laval gear turbines; 4 Foster Wheeler boilers; 85,000 shp
- Speed: 32 kn (59 km/h; 37 mph)
- Range: 8,000 @ 20 knots
- Complement: 32 officers, 413 enlisted

USS Dale (DLG-19/CG-19) was a Leahy-class cruiser in service with the United States Navy from 1963 to 1994. She was sunk as a target in 2000 off the East Coast of the United States near Maryland.

== History ==
Dale was named in honor of Commodore Richard Dale (1756–1826). She was built at New York Shipbuilding Corporation, Camden, New Jersey, USA and commissioned at the Philadelphia Naval Shipyard on 23 November 1963. Her sponsor was Mrs. Daniel J. Flood. Assigned to Commander Cruiser-Destroyer Force Pacific Fleet, she made five deployments to the Western Pacific over the next seven years. Between 1965 and 1970, Dale's Seventh Fleet tours included participation in Vietnam War operations, during which she rescued several American aviators in the Gulf of Tonkin.

=== 1970s ===
On 10 November 1970 Dale was decommissioned and began modernization at Bath, Maine to increase flexibility in combat systems. This work fitted her with the Naval Tactical Data System (NTDS) and other improvements that enhanced her anti-air and anti-submarine warfare capabilities. When recommissioned on 11 December 1971, Dale was assigned to Commander Cruiser-Destroyer Force, Atlantic Fleet and homeported in Newport, Rhode Island.

In Dale's first Mediterranean deployment in June 1973, she participated in the multinational exercise "Swift Move" in northern European Waters, and helped augment the Sixth Fleet in the eastern Mediterranean during the tense period of U.S.-Soviet relations that accompanied the October 1973 Yom Kippur War.

In February 1974, Dale moved to her new homeport in Mayport, Florida. During 1974, Dale was selected as the operational platform for the newly deployed AN/SPS-49 two dimensional air search radar, which took Dale to the Caribbean several times during 1974 and early 1975.

Dale was reclassified as a guided-missile cruiser (CG-19) at the beginning of July 1975. In October 1975, Dale deployed to the Mediterranean, participating successfully in several national and multinational exercises and earning praise from Commander, Sixth Fleet and Commander-in-Chief, U.S. Naval Forces, Europe on her departure for home.

In July 1976, she helped represent the U.S. Navy during the Bicentennial Naval Review in New York Harbor. Then, Dale began a regular 12-month overhaul at the Charleston Naval Shipyard which upgraded Dale's NTDS and missile fire control systems. Upon the completion of the overhaul, the cruiser returned to Mayport.

In June 1978, Dale deployed to the Mediterranean, participating successfully in several national and multinational exercises returning home February 1979.

In September 1979, Dale deployed to the North Atlantic for two months to serve as the flagship for the Commander Striking Force Atlantic Fleet for the NATO exercise "Ocean Safari."

=== 1980s ===
In January and February 1980, Dale participated in the Atlantic Fleet Readiness Exercise "READEX 1-80." Dale deployed to the Mediterranean Sea in March 1980 and, as a unit of the Sixth Fleet, served as flagship for Commander-Destroyer Group Eight. A highlight of this deployment was entering the Black Sea to visit Constanța, Romania. Dale returned to Mayport in August 1980. The remainder of the year included two trips to the Caribbean for carrier support operations and participations in "COMPUTEX/ASWEX 1-81."

Dale entered the Charleston Naval Shipyard in March 1981 to begin a Baseline Overhaul to update the ship's combat weapons systems and overhaul major engineering equipment. During the overhaul, which Dale completed a month early in February 1982, the 3 inch/50 caliber gun mounts were replaced with Harpoon surface-to-surface guided missiles and the Phalanx gun system to the port and starboard sides. Dale completed Refresher Training in June 1982.

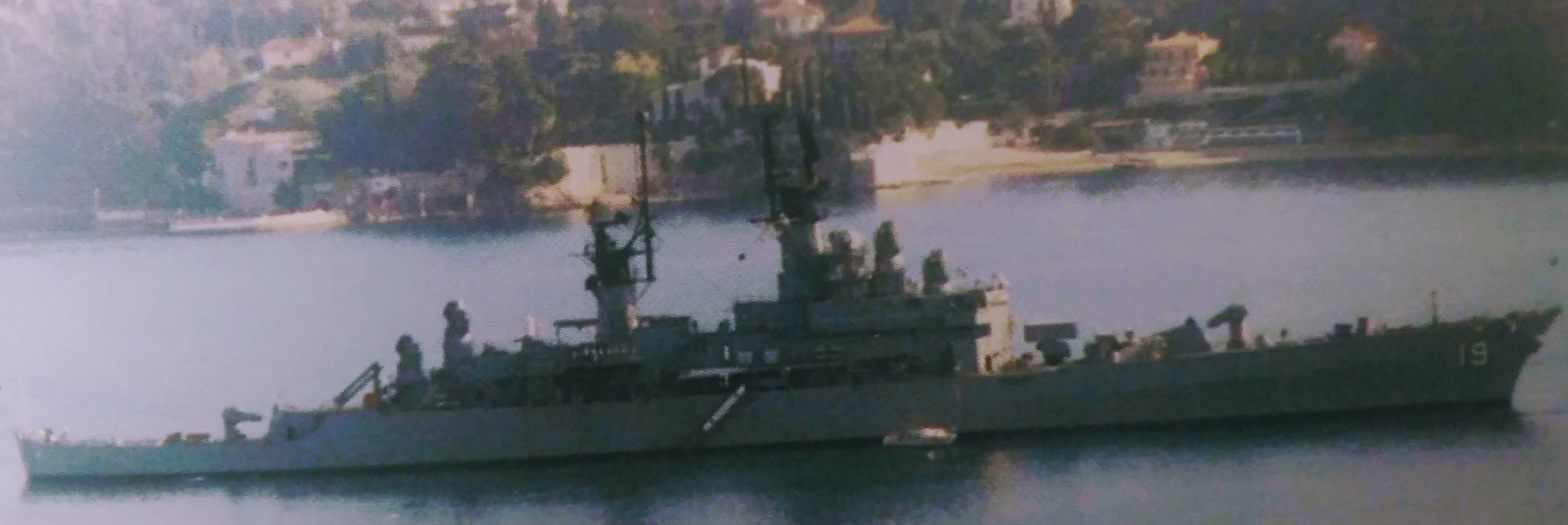
USS Dale (CG-19) anchored off Villefranche-sur-Mer, France, on 25 December 1982

Dale deployed December 1982 to the Mediterranean. After port visits in Villefranche-sur-Mer, France and Athens, Greece, Dale transited the Suez Canal to the Indian Ocean. While in the Indian Ocean the vessel made port visits to Karachi, Pakistan; Trincomalee, Sri Lanka; and, Mombasa, Kenya. As the guided missile cruiser was headed to Diego Garcia, she crossed the equator on 26 February 1983 and again on 12 April 1983–344 people became Shellbacks. On the morning of 27 April 1983, Dale was conducting tactical maneuvers with other ships of the U.S. and British fleets. During the course of the exercise, the British frigate HMS Ambuscade collided with Dale's port quarter. Resulting in serious damage to the Ambuscade's bow and enough damage to have the Dale Dry docked when she returned to Jacksonville Florida. A team was flown in from USS America to help R and First Divisions make satisfactory repairs, enough to keep her seaworthy and to get her to the Mediterranean. Finishing touches would be completed while re-transiting the Suez Canal on her way to the Indian Ocean. Dale re-transited the Suez Canal to the Mediterranean Sea. The cruiser's last port call was Málaga, Spain before heading back to United States of America in June 1983.

During the 1980s her Mediterranean tours were sometimes extended to take her into the increasingly important Indian Ocean and Persian Gulf regions. In 1986 she took part in the confrontation with Libya.

Dale received an extensive overhaul at the Philadelphia Naval Shipyard which included the New Threat Upgrade combat systems enhancement. Dale entered the yard January 1987 and completed the overhaul June 1988. Dale deployed with the USS America (CV-66) battle group to the Mediterranean Sea and Indian Ocean on 11 May 1989 and returned to Mayport 10 November 1989.

=== 1990s ===
Dale spent much of her final years of service on counter-narcotics patrols in the Caribbean area, and the Gulf of Mexico, as well as on regular cruises with the Sixth Fleet. During 1991 she went to the Red Sea to help enforce sanctions against Iraq after Operation Desert Storm. She had similar duties in 93, in support of United Nations' Resolutions concerning Bosnia and Yugoslavia.

== Fate ==
The USS Dale was decommissioned in September 1994, at Naval Station Mayport, Florida. She made her way to Philadelphia Naval Shipyard at some point in June 1999. She was then towed to Roosevelt Roads Naval Station in December 1999 to participate in "CG-19 Weapons Effect Test (WET)". On 17 December 1999, a 500lb SLAM-ER missile detonated in the aft portion of the ship. Then on 13 January 2000, an F/A-18 Hornet pilot fired a tactical SLAM-ER and made a direct hit to the forward starboard side of the ship. She was then towed back to Naval Station Roosevelt Roads for evaluation. Ultimately, she was sent back out once more and on 6 April 2000 was sunk as a target off the East Coast near Maryland: 037° 35' 59.0" North / 070° 45' 04.0" West... 2,150 Fathoms or 12,900 feet, and 485 feet lower than the RMS Titanic.

== Awards ==
List of awards from the Navy unit awards site.

- Joint Meritorious Unit Award, 15 August 1990 to 12 October 1990.
- Joint Meritorious Unit Award, 9 March 1992 to 7 April 1992.
- Navy Unit Commendation, 23 March 1986 to 17 April 1986, Action in the Gulf of Sidra (1986).
- Meritorious Unit Commendation, for the ship's actions from 24 July 1991 to 2 November 1991 and the Carrier battle group for 1 June 1991 to 12 December 1991.
- Navy E Ribbon, for 7/1974 to 6/1975, 7/1975 to 9/1976, FY1979, FY1980, CY1992 and CY1993.
- Navy Expeditionary Medal, for Lebanon in January 1983.
- Navy Expeditionary Medal, for Libya during the March to June 1986, Action in the Gulf of Sidra (1986)
- Armed Forces Expeditionary Medal, for four time frames relating to Korea from April 1969 to June 1969.
- Armed Forces Expeditionary Medal, for operations relating to Vietnam from February to June 1965.
- Armed Forces Expeditionary Medal, for the Persian Gulf award period from June 1989 to December 1989.
- Vietnam Service Medal, for several time periods between 1966 and 1970
- Southwest Asia Service Medal, for 12 June 1991 to 25 July 1991, following Desert Storm.
- Armed Forces Service Medal, for two occasions relating to Bosnia in 1994
- Coast Guard Special Operations Service Ribbon, for 19 January to 24 February 1990.

Also:

- National Defense Service Medal (second)
- Sea Service Ribbon (seventh)

Dale was also nominated for another Meritorious Unit Commendation for 1 April 1988 to 1 April 1989, but received a Secretary of the Navy Letter of Commendation instead.
