= California-class cruiser =

Nuclear guided-missile cruiser class of the US Navy

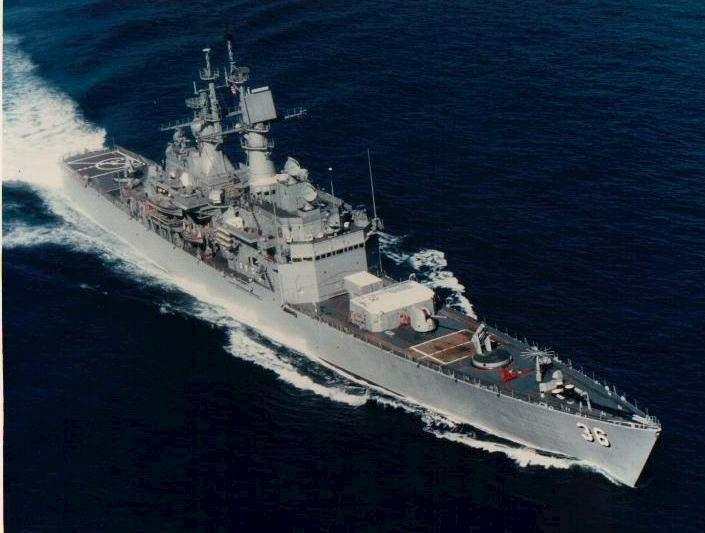
- USS California underway

Class overview
- Builders: Newport News Shipbuilding and Dry Dock Company, VA
- Operators: United States Navy
- Preceded by: Truxtun class; Belknap class
- Succeeded by: Virginia class
- Built: 1970–1974
- In commission: 1974–1999
- Completed: 2
- Active: 0
- Retired: 2

General characteristics
- Type: Guided-missile cruiser
- Displacement: 10,600 long tons (10,800 t)
- Length: 587 ft (179 m)
- Beam: 61 ft (19 m)
- Draft: 31 ft 6 in (9.60 m)
- Propulsion: 2 × General Electric D2G reactors generating 60,000 shp (45,000 kW)
- Speed: In excess of 30 knots (56 km/h)
- Complement: 40 officers and 544 enlisted
- Sensors & processing systems: AN/SPS-48E 3-D Air search radar; AN/SPS-49 2-D Air search radar NTU; AN/SPS-55 Surface search radar; AN/SPG-51 Missile fire control radar; Mk 86 Gun Fire Control System; AN/SPQ-9 Search and fire control radar; AN/SPG-60 Gun fire control radar; AN/SQS-26 Bow mounted sonar
- Electronic warfare & decoys: AN/SLQ-32; Mark 36 SRBOC; AN/SLQ-25 Nixie
- Armament: 2 × Mk 141 Harpoon missile launchers; 2 × 5 inch/54 caliber Mk 45 lightweight guns; 2 × 20 mm Phalanx CIWS; 1 × ASROC missile launcher; 2 × Mk 13 missile launchers for RIM-66D Standard missiles (MR); 6 × 12.75" torpedo tubes for Mark 46 torpedoes; 4 × .50 caliber machine guns
- Aviation facilities: Helicopter deck aft able to accommodate SH-2 Seasprite LAMPS Mk1, SH-3 Sea King, and CH-46 Sea Knight helicopters. No hangar facility.

The California class was a pair of nuclear-powered guided-missile cruisers operated by the United States Navy between 1974 and 1998. Other than their nuclear power supply and lack of helicopter hangars, ships of the California class were comparable to other guided-missile cruisers of their era, such as the Belknap class. The class was built as a follow-up to the nuclear-powered Long Beach, Bainbridge, and Truxtun classes. Like all of the nuclear cruisers, which could steam for years between refuelings, the California class was designed in part to provide high endurance escort for the navy's nuclear aircraft carriers, which were often limited in range due to their conventionally powered escorts continuously needing to be refueled.

== Overview ==
California (CGN-36) was the fourth nuclear-powered cruiser in the US Navy; the previous three were Long Beach (CGN-9), Bainbridge (CGN-25), and Truxtun (CGN-35). The second California-class cruiser, South Carolina (CGN-37), was the fifth nuclear-powered cruiser in the US Navy. Only two ships of the class were built, California and South Carolina, and both were decommissioned in late 1999. These ships were followed on by the four nuclear-powered cruisers of the Virginia class. These cruisers were named for states because they were seen as quite large, powerful, capable, and survivable ships. Other than the four ships of the Soviet Navy's Kirov class, which were built with a combination of nuclear and fossil-fuel propulsion, no other country has launched nuclear-powered cruisers.

California and her sister ship, South Carolina, were equipped with two Mk 13 launchers, fore and aft, capable of firing the Standard SM-1MR or SM-2MR surface-to-air missiles, one Mk 112 launcher for ASROC missiles, and eight Mk 141 launch tubes for Harpoon missiles. They were equipped with two Mk 45 5-inch rapid-fire guns, fore and aft. Four 12.75-inch torpedo launchers (two on each side, protruding from their magazine space on the main deck) were fitted for lightweight anti-submarine torpedoes. Two Mk 15 Phalanx 20 mm close-in weapon systems were fitted in the 1980s.

The ships were originally designed to carry and launch the Mark 48 torpedo from a large space beneath the flight deck aft. Although a surface-launched version of the Mk 48 was never produced, the ships retained this large magazine space until their retirement.

Both ships underwent a mid-life refueling and overhaul in the early 1990s to give them a further 18 years of active service. This modernization upgraded their two 150 MW D2G reactor plants with new 165 MW D2W reactor cores, installed the New Threat Upgrade (NTU) to improve their anti-aircraft warfare (AAW) capability, and removed their anti-submarine warfare (ASW) capability, which involved disabling their SQS-26 sonar and removing their ASROC anti-submarine weapons. However, the two triple Mk 32 ASW torpedo launchers were retained. External differences resulting from this modernization included the removal of the ASROC launcher and the large deckhouse forward of it that served as the ASROC magazine, the replacement of the SPS-40 radar antenna with the SPS-49 antenna, and the replacement of the SPS-48C with the larger SPS-48E antenna. Both ships retained the bulbous sonar domes at the forefoot (beneath the waterline) until retirement, even after their sonar systems were disabled. While the ships were as modernized as possible and were capable of service until 2010, they were still only capable of firing SM-2MR missiles from their Mk 13 launchers, and their high cost of operation made them targets for early retirement. They were both decommissioned in 1999.

== Ships in class ==
Ship	Hull Number	Keel laid	Launched	Commissioned	Deactivated	Decommissioned	Fate
California	CGN-36	23 Jan 1970	22 Sep 1971	16 Feb 1974	1 Oct 1998	9 Jul 1999	Disposed of through Ship-Submarine Recycling Program at Bremerton, 2000
South Carolina	CGN-37	1 Dec 1970	1 Jul 1972	25 Jan 1975	4 Sep 1998	30 Jul 1999	Disposed of through Ship-Submarine Recycling Program at Bremerton, 2007

== See also ==
- List of cruisers of the United States Navy
- List of United States Navy destroyer leaders
