= New Threat Upgrade =

US Navy anti-air warfare ships system upgrade

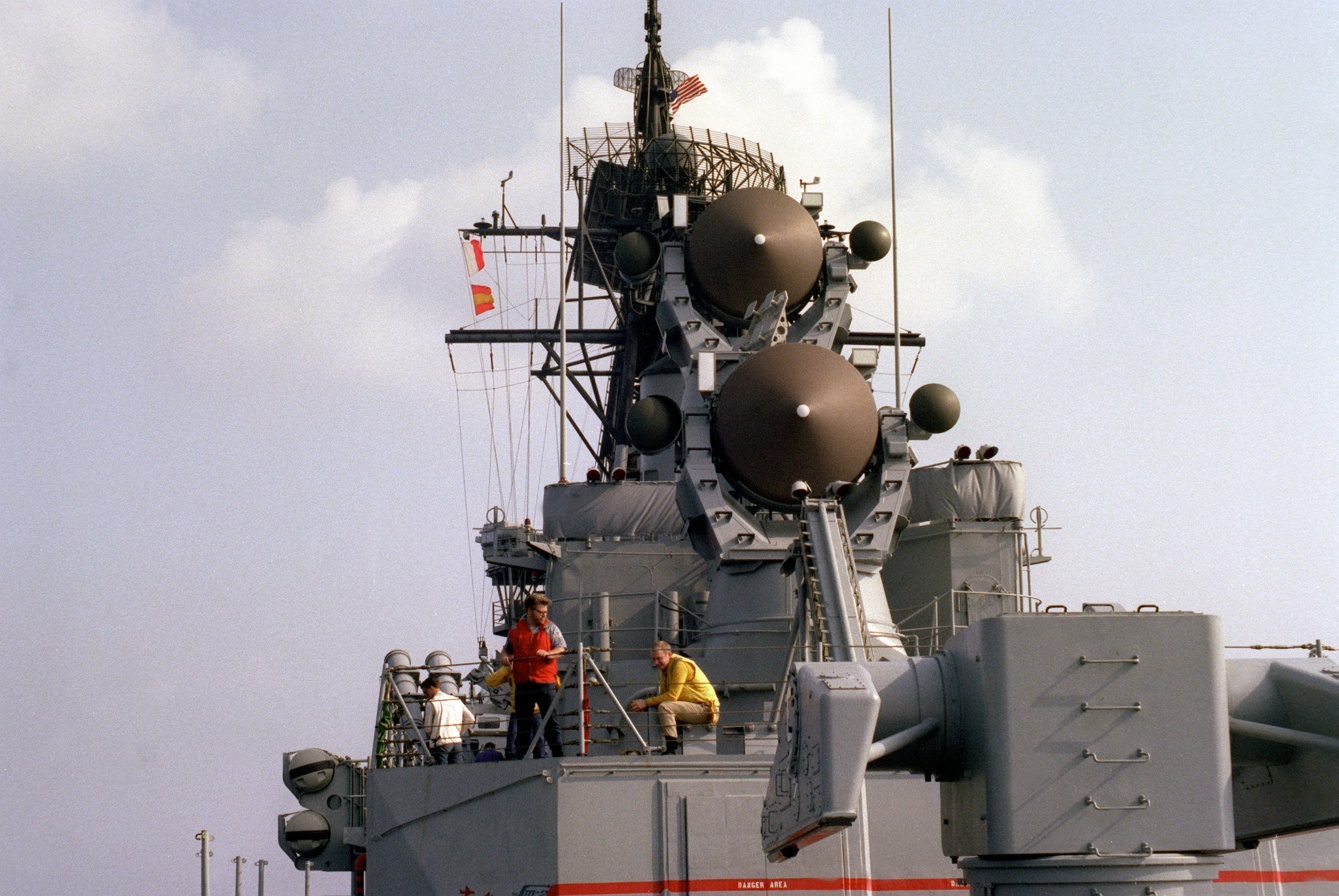
In 1983, the USS Mahan (DDG-42) was underway to test and evaluate the Terrier New Threat Upgrade (NTU) Combat System.

New Threat Upgrade (NTU) was a United States Navy program to improve and modernize the capability of existing cruisers and destroyers equipped with Terrier and Tartar anti-aircraft systems, keeping them in service longer.

== The Program ==
USS Mahan (DDG-42) was selected to install and test the Terrier New Threat Upgrade (NTU) Combat System with the improved Standard Missile Two Block II (Extended Range). Testing lasted from October 1981- March 1985.

New Threat Upgrade allowed the full use of newer Standard missiles (SM-2ER BlkII w/Mk80 booster) and improved the interoperability of the radar, computer, tracking and engagement systems aboard the ships. The system allows the ships to which it was fitted to time share illumination radars for multiple missile interceptions in a manner similar the Aegis Combat System.

== History ==
The new threat that prompted the development of The New Threat Upgrade was the deployment by the Soviet Union of their Tupolev Tu-22M “Backfire” bomber and its AS-4 "Kitchen" missile with its capability of approaching a targeted ship at a very high altitude. At a predetermined point the missile dove almost vertically on the ship. Contemporary US weapon systems weren’t capable of detecting incoming threats at such high angles. The New Threat Upgrade was intended to increase the capabilities of current weapon systems to detect and destroy this threat.

The New Threat Upgrade to the Leahy class included massive remodeling of the ship from service space rehabilitation to a main propulsion system overhaul. Entire systems were removed and replaced, for example the AN/SPS-40 air-search radar was replaced with the AN/SPS-49 air-search radar.

In 1988–90, the Kidd-class destroyers received the New Threat Upgrade, including a new superstructure and heavier mainmast cooperative engagement with Aegis Ticonderoga-class cruisers, which could control the Kidds' surface-to-air missiles while they remained electronically silent. The Spruance class, the predecessor to and close relative of the Kidd-class, did not receive the NTU.

=== End of NTU ===
The Cold War ended shortly after the New Threat Upgrade was initiated. The lower levels of funding available to the United States Navy after the Cold War meant that the NTU upgrade was never applied to all of the intended vessels. The NTU upgrade itself was expensive. Many of these ships were retired in the 1990s whether they received the full NTU modification or not; most of these warships built in the 1960s-1970s had high operational costs and manpower requirements (especially those which were nuclear-powered), compared to newer Aegis warships. The USS Texas (CGN-39) was decommissioned during the upgrade, in the midst of her reactor refueling. USS Gridley (CG-21) received NTU in 1991 at a cost of $55 million but was decommissioned in early 1994. Overall, all US Navy ships that received the NTU upgrades were decommissioned within six years of their upgrade, as the Navy chose instead to order new ships with the Aegis weapon system.

The Navy also accelerated the retirement of the Spruance and Kidd classes, despite their recent modifications, due to the arrival of the Aegis-equipped Arleigh Burke-class destroyers, which were more effective and cost-efficient. The four Kidd destroyers were later transferred to Taiwan (Republic of China) where they remain in service, while some members of the Spruance class remained in service until 2005.

== NTU systems ==
- AN/SPS-49(V)5 - A 2D Air Search Radar (azimuth and range)
- AN/SPS-48E - A 3D Air Search Radar (azimuth, range and altitude)
- AN/SYS-2(V)1 Integrated Automatic Detection and Tracking System (IADTS)
- (A)CDS - (Advanced) Combat Direction System
- WDS Mk 14 - Weapons Direction System
- Mk 74 Tartar and Mk 76 Terrier Fire Control Systems (AN/SPG-55B radar for Terrier ships and AN/SPG-51 for Tartar)
- AN/SYR-1 Communications Tracking Set, used for SM-2 missile downlink
- Mk 10 twin-arm manual launcher, Mk 13 single-arm automated launcher and Mk 26 twin-arm, automated missile launchers
- RESS - Radar Environmental Simulator System

== NTU ships ==
These classes had some of their units modified with the New Threat Upgrade.

- Belknap-class cruiser
- California-class cruiser
- Charles F. Adams-class destroyer - Planned to be upgraded, but canceled.
- Farragut-class destroyer (1958) - Planned, but only USS Mahan (DDG-42) was upgraded as a test platform in 1982.
- Kidd-class destroyer
- Leahy-class cruiser - All upgraded in the late-1980s and decommissioned by 1995.
- Virginia-class cruiser

=== KDX-II Class ===
The Navy of the Republic of Korea uses a NTU derived system for its Chungmugong Yi Sunshin class destroyers.

== See also ==
- Standard missile
