= AN/SPG-55 =

Navy missile target and guidance radar

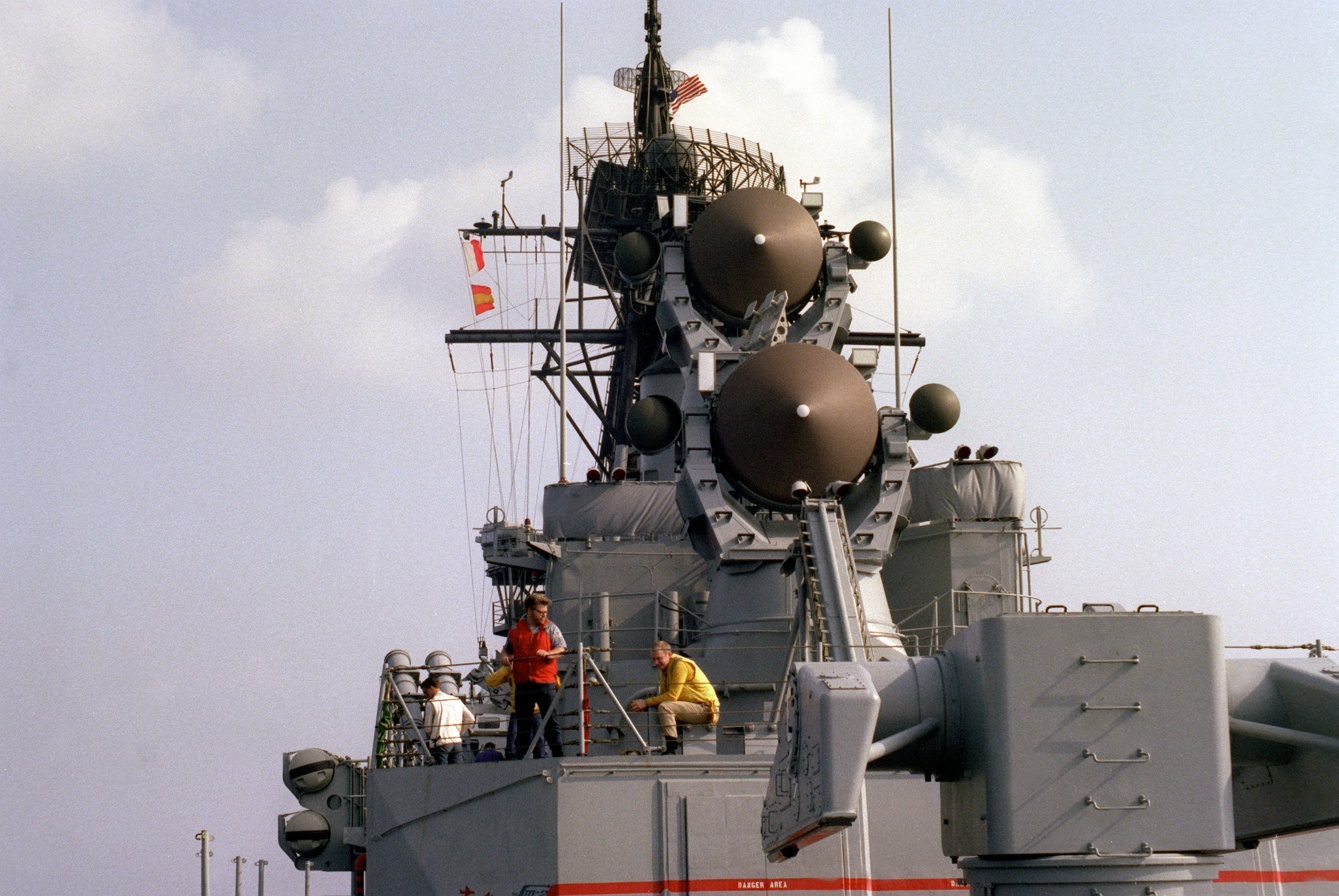
- USS Mahan (DDG-42) with Mark 10 Terrier/Standard missile launcher
- Country of origin: United States
- Type: Missile fire-control
- Frequency: C-band (Tracking) (Note: There are several different, incompatible "frequency band" systems that use the same lettering. The SPS-55 is typically described as "C-band" in relevant literature, under an older system where "C-band" corresponded to the 3900 - 6200 Mc frequency range. Other sources refer to it as G band (NATO).); X-band (Illuminator)
- PRF: 427 Hz
- Range: 300,000 yd (150 nmi)
- Precision: Fire control quality three-dimensional data

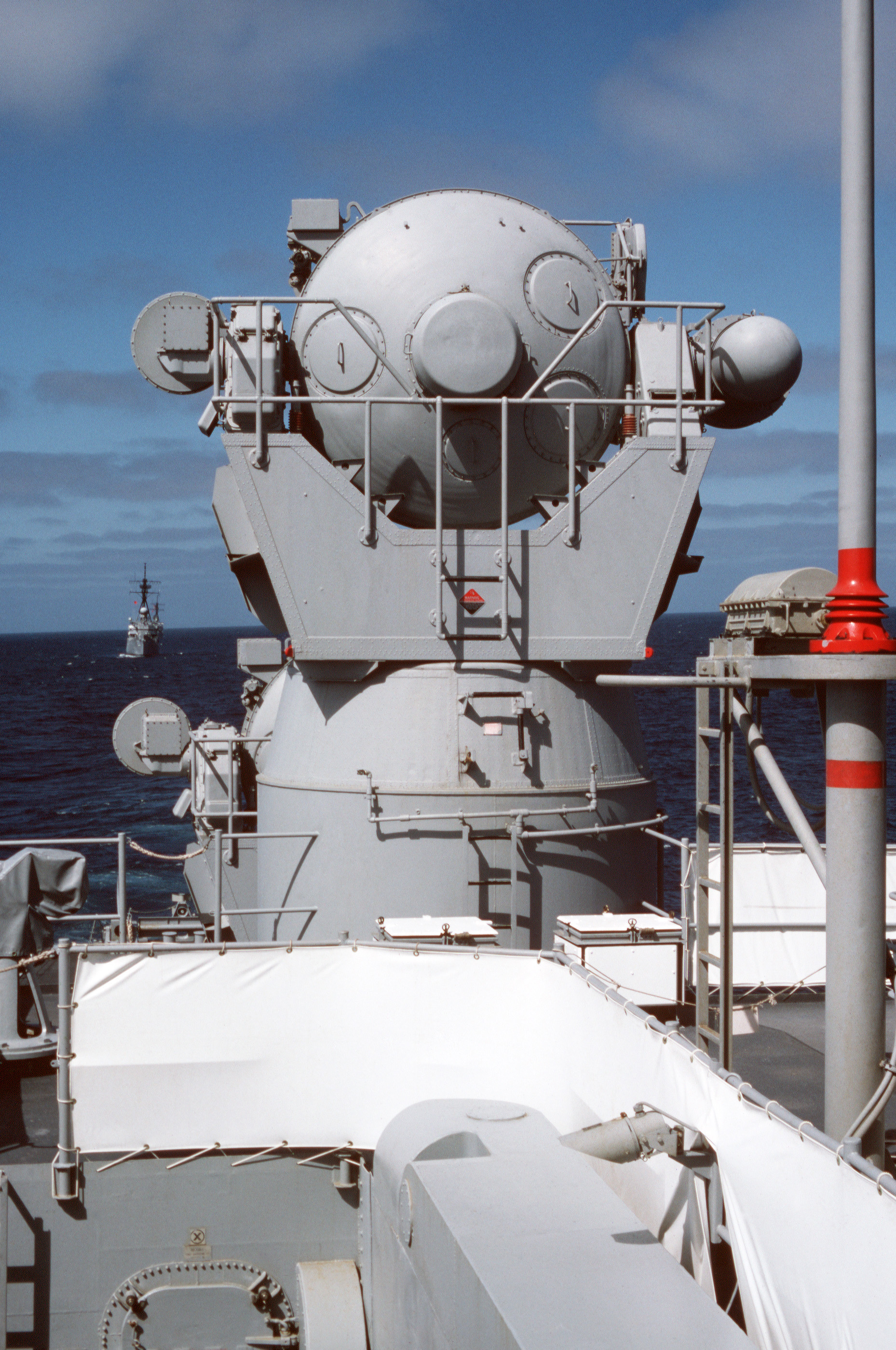
Rear view of the AN/SPG-55B aboard USS Worden (CG-18).

The AN/SPG-55 was an American tracking / illumination radar for Terrier and RIM-67 Standard missiles (SM-1ER/SM-2ER). It was used for target tracking and surface-to-air missile guidance as part of the Mk 76 missile fire control system. It was controlled by a UNIVAC 1218 computer.

In accordance with the Joint Electronics Type Designation System (JETDS), the "AN/SPG-55" designation represents the 55th design of an Army-Navy electronic device for waterborne fire control radar system. The JETDS system also now is used to name all Department of Defense electronic systems.

== Design ==
=== Overall Layout ===
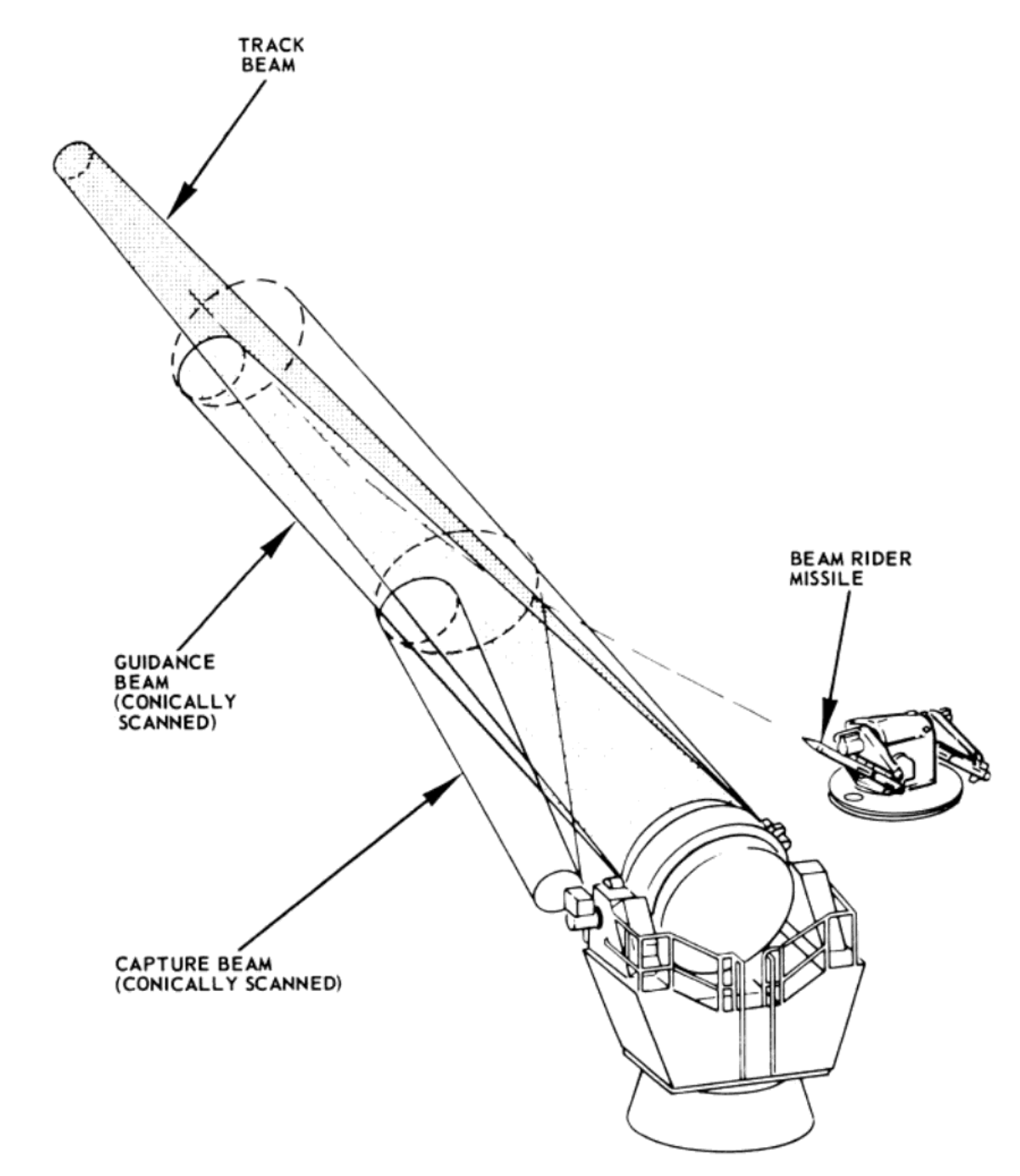
AN/SPG-55 Radar track, guidance, and capture beam relationships

The AN/SPG-55B antenna assembly consists of two separate antennas: the main antenna, which provides the track beam, guidance beam, and cwi beam, and the capture antenna, which provides the capture beam. The capture-guidance mode is employed for control of beam-riding missiles, and the track cwi mode is used for semi-active radar homing (SARH) missiles.

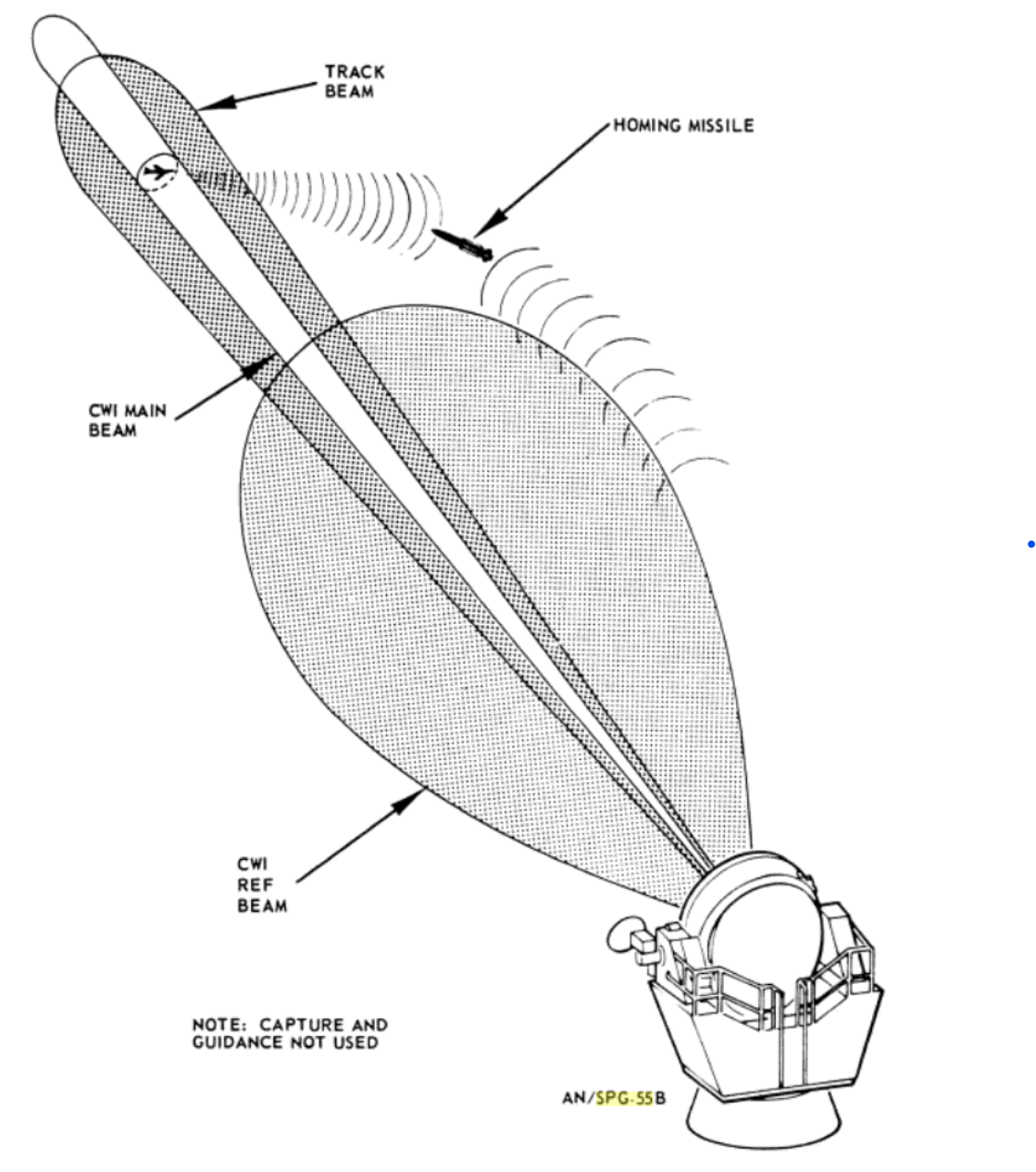
Relationship between CW Illumination and Track beams on AN/SPG-55.

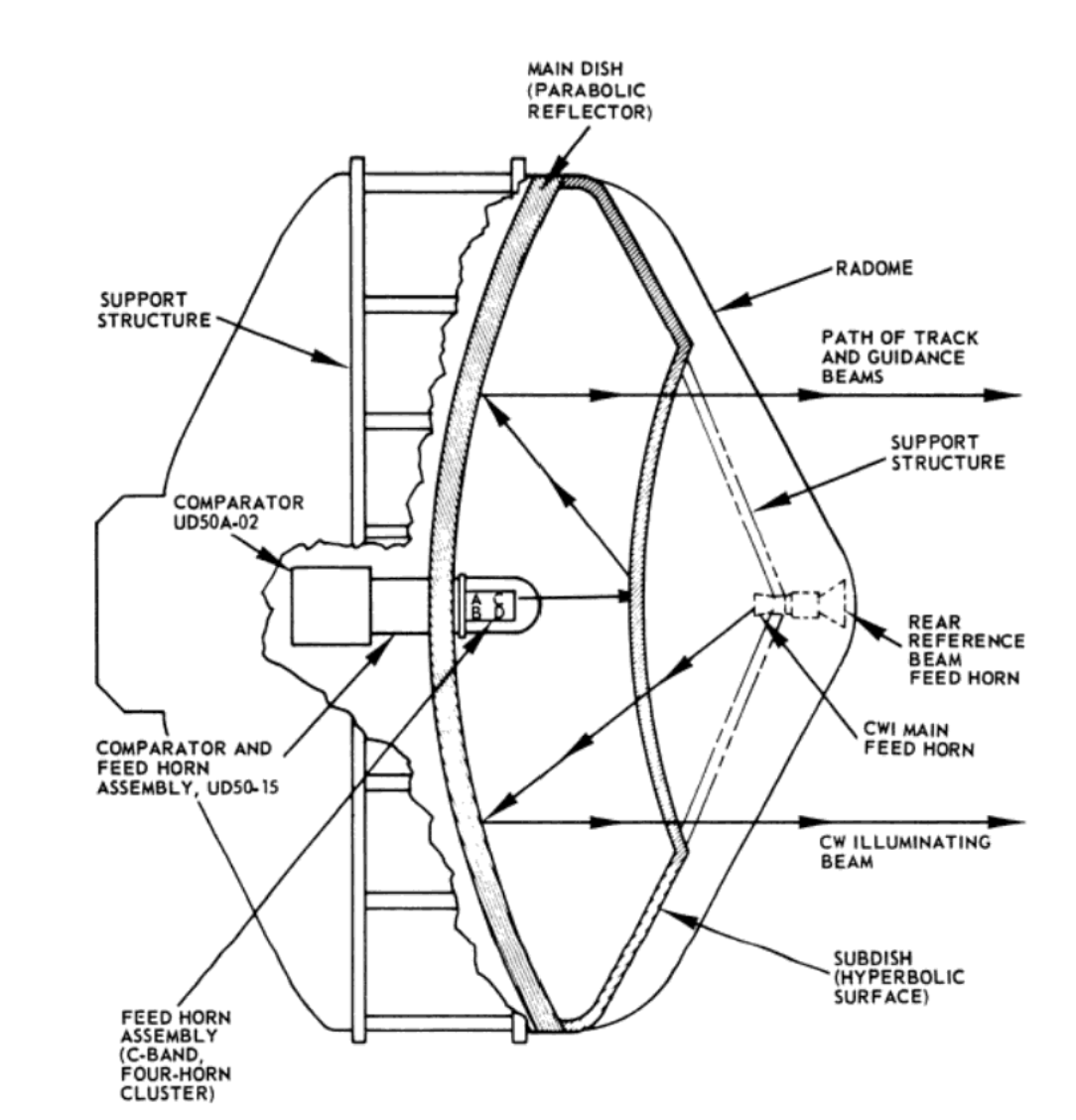
Layout of antenna assembly for AN/SPG-55

The SPG-55 has two antennas: the main antenna, and the capture antenna. The main antenna handles tracking, guidance, and CW illumination. The capture antenna is used to capture and guide the beam-riding Terriers into the guidance beam.

=== Main Antenna ===
The main antenna is a Cassegrainian design, consisting of a main dish, subdish, support structure, comparator, and feed horn assembly for C-band radiation. An X-band feed horn assembly is mounted in front of the reflectors. The entire assembly is protected by a radome.

The main dish consists of a parabolic metal surface with a dielectric support grating of parallel wires. The parabolic surface acts as a rotational reflector that reflects either vertically or horizontally polarized incident RF energy. The incident RF, when reflected, is rotated 90 degrees. The subdish consists of a hyperbolic dielectric surface with grating of horizontal wires. This surface reflects polarized RF energy but is transparent to vertically polarized radiation.

The C-band feed horn assembly radiates horizontally-polarized RF energy that is reflected by the horizontal wires of the subdish. The C-band energy is again reflected by the main dish and rotated 90 degrees to vertical polarization. The vertically-polarized C-band energy is then radiated through the subdish as a narrow beam.

The comparator forms track and guidance RF energy into the track and guidance beams, and extracts range, elevation, and traverse information from each target return. The C-band feed horn assembly consists of a four-horn monopulse cluster located at the vertex of the parabolic surface. Guidance RF energy is generated by the guidance transmitter and shares the same feed horn assembly. It is radiated as a conically-scanned beam.

The two X-band feed horns are mounted back-to-back near the focus of the parabolic surface. The X-band feed horn facing the main dish radiates vertically polarized RF energy. The subdish is transparent to this radiation, and the main dish reflects it as a narrow beam for CW illumination. The X-band feed horn facing away from the main dish transmits X-band, vertically polarized RF energy as a broad beam centered about the main CW illuminating beam. This provides the rear reference beam, which provides the missile with identification of the proper illumination radar.

The CW feed horn facing the main dish and the four horns of the C-band feed horn assembly are cross-polarized, thereby reducing incident X-band radiation on the C-band, four-horn cluster. In addition, low-pass filters inserted in all the microwave channels leading to the receiving system effectively filter out any X-band signals superimposed on C-band channels.

=== Capture Antenna ===
The capture antenna subassembly, like the main antenna, is a Cassegrainian type. It consists of a circular waveguide feed horn, a polarized parabolic reflector, and a polarization converter. The circular waveguide feed horn operates in the transverse electric mode. The feed horn is skewed at a preset angle from the boresight to produce a circular symmetrical beam pattern. The RF energy emitted from the feed horn is vertically polarized. The rotation pattern is such that the phase front of radiated energy is not affected during rotation. Therefore, the radiated energy from the feed horn, which is incident on the parabolic reflector, is still vertically polarized.

The parabolic reflector serves as a vertically polarized focusing radome. Therefore, horizontally polarized energy is reflected and only vertically polarized energy is transmitted. Since the RF energy from the feed horn is horizontally polarized, the radome reflects and focuses this incident energy into the polarization converter.

The polarization converter consists of metal plate polarization grids, which are one-quarter wavelength (C-band frequency) in thickness and bonded to the surface of the plate. The polarization grids are oriented at an angle of 45 degrees to the incident energy.

The operation of the polarization converter is identical to the polarization converter of the main antenna assembly. Therefore, the horizontally polarized incident energy is reflected as vertically polarized energy and transmitted through the radome as the capture beam.

== On board ships ==
=== United States Navy ===
- Kitty Hawk-class aircraft carrier
- Belknap-class cruiser
- Leahy-class cruiser
- Farragut-class destroyer
- USS Long Beach (CGN-9)
- USS Bainbridge (CGN-25)
- USS Truxtun (CGN-35)

=== (Italy) Italian Navy ===
- Andrea Doria-class cruiser
- Giuseppe Garibaldi-class cruiser
- Vittorio Veneto-class cruiser

== Variants ==
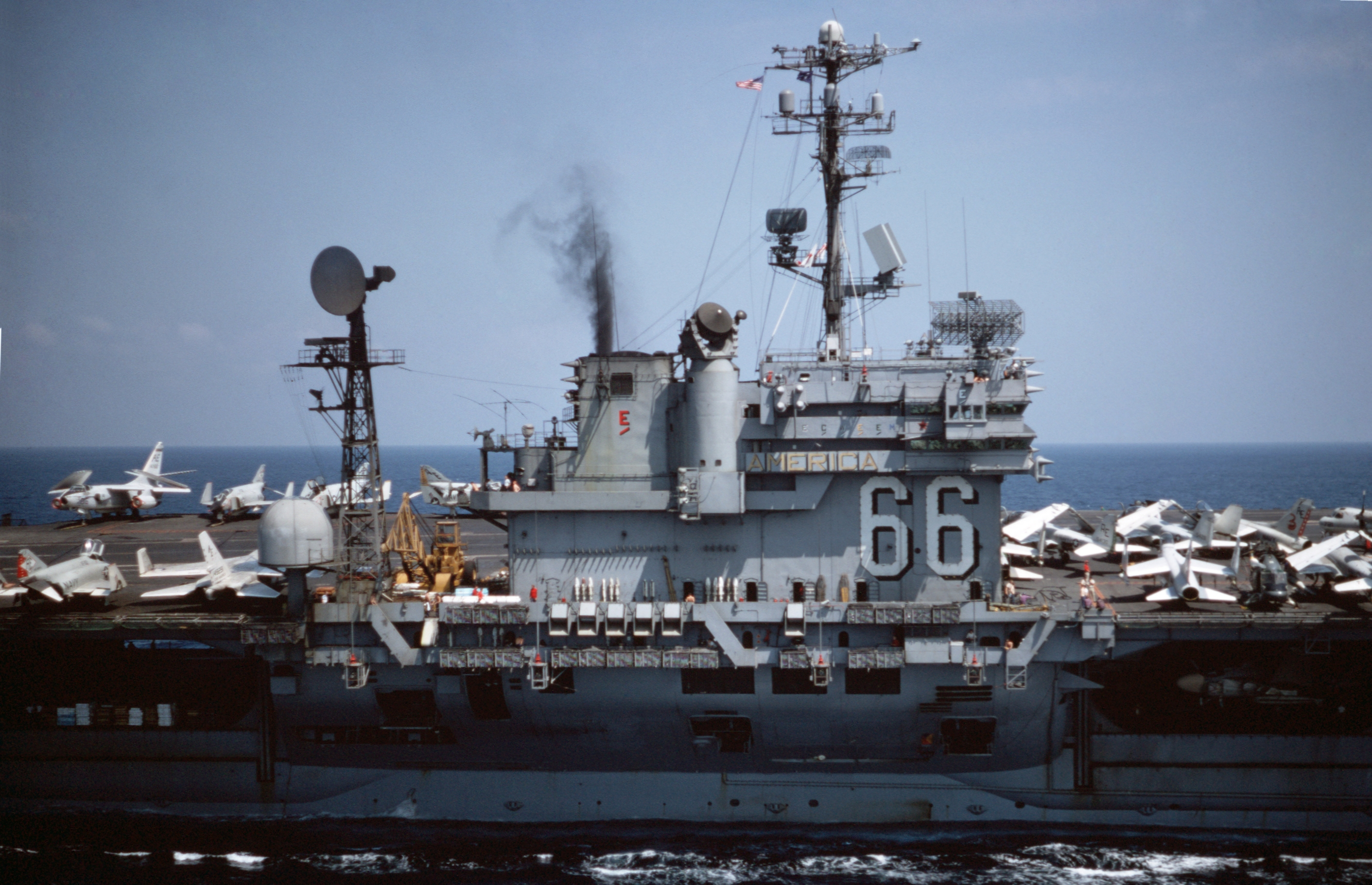
An SPG-55 on the starboard side USS America (CV-66). (center of image)

- AN/SPG 55 - Original version supported Beam riding Terrier missiles.
- AN/SPG 55A - Supported Beam-riding and homing Terrier missiles
- AN/SPG 55B - Supported Beam-riding and homing Terrier missiles as well as newer Standard missiles.

== See also ==
- List of radars
- List of military electronics of the United States
