= USS Biddle (CG-34) =

Belknap-class guided missile frigate/cruiser of the United States Navy

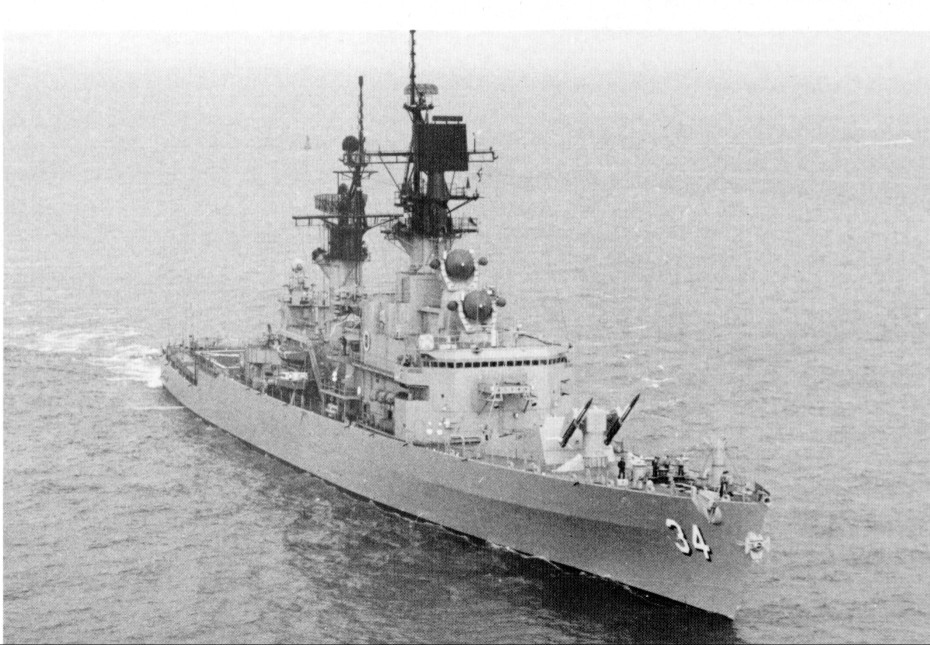
- USS Biddle (DLG-34/CG-34)

History

United States
- Name: Biddle
- Namesake: Nicholas Biddle
- Ordered: 16 January 1962
- Builder: Bath Iron Works
- Laid down: 9 December 1963
- Launched: 2 July 1965
- Sponsored by: Mrs. William H. Bates
- Acquired: 10 January 1967
- Commissioned: 21 January 1967
- Decommissioned: 30 November 1993
- Reclassified: 30 June 1975 as CG-34
- Stricken: 30 November 1993
- Home port: NS Norfolk, Virginia (former)
- Motto: Deus Clypeus Meus
- Fate: Sold for scrap. Scrapping completed 2 January 2002
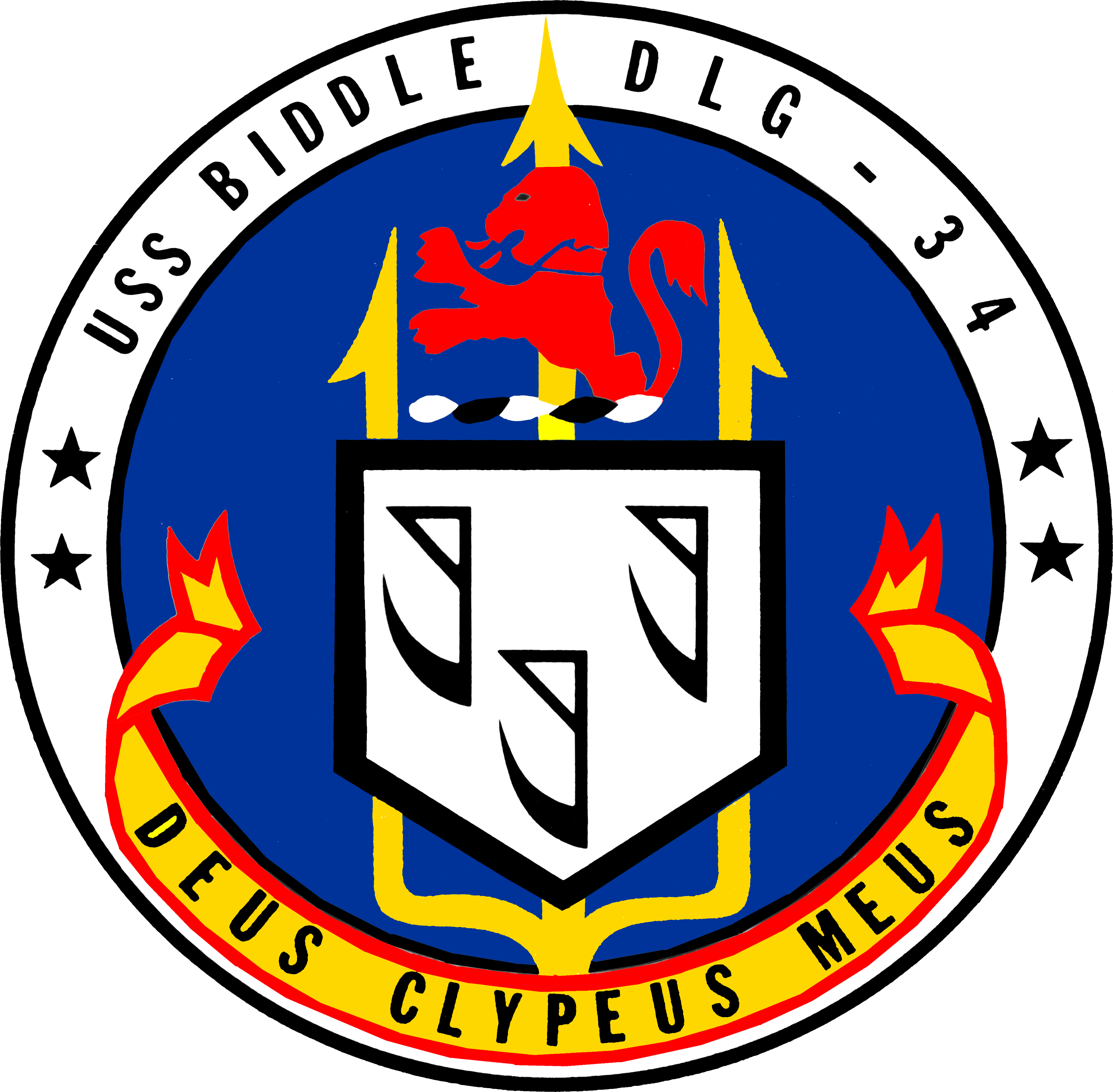
- Badge

General characteristics
- Class & type: Belknap-class guided missile cruiser
- Displacement: 7,930 tons (full load)
- Length: 547 ft (167 m)
- Beam: 55 ft (17 m)
- Draught: 31 ft (9.4 m) (maximum navigational)
- Propulsion: 4 – 1,200 psi (8,300 kPa) boilers; 2 geared turbines, 2 shafts; 85,000 shp (63,000 kW)
- Speed: 32 knots (59 km/h; 37 mph)
- Complement: 477 (27 officers, 450 enlisted)
- Sensors & processing systems: AN/SPS-48E air-search radar; AN/SPS-49(V)5 air-search radar; AN/SPG-55B fire-control radar; AN/SPG-53F gun fire-control radar; AN/SQS-26 sonar
- Electronic warfare & decoys: AN/SLQ-32
- Armament: one Mark 42 five-inch / 54-caliber gun, two 3"/50 caliber guns, one Mark 10 Mod 7 Missile System Terrier missile / SM-2ER/ASROC launcher, six 15.5-inch torpedo tubes, Harpoon missiles, Phalanx CIWS
- Aircraft carried: 1 x SH-2F Seasprite (LAMPS)

USS Biddle (DLG-34/CG-34) was a Belknap-class guided missile frigate/cruiser of the United States Navy. She saw action in Vietnam, where she is believed to be the last ship to down an enemy aircraft with hand-loaded guns. She was involved in the Gulf of Sidra incident in 1981. The cruiser was decommissioned on 30 November 1993 and sold for scrap on 4 December 2000.

== History ==
Biddle was laid down by the Bath Iron Works Corporation at Bath, Maine on 9 December 1963, launched on 2 July 1965 and commissioned as DLG-34 on 21 January 1967. She was named for Captain Nicholas Biddle of the Continental Navy. Her call sign was "Hard Charger".

Five months after commissioning, Biddle completed preparations for her final acceptance trials, concluded those trials, and conducted shakedown training out of Guantanamo Bay, Cuba. She completed shakedown on 29 May and headed, via Yorktown, Virginia, to Boston, Massachusetts. The Destroyer Leader "guided-missile" arrived in Boston on 2 June and began post-shakedown availability at the Boston Naval Shipyard five days later. Biddle completed the availability on 30 October and got underway for her new home port, Norfolk, Virginia, the following day. The warship entered Hampton Roads early in November, but stayed only four days, putting to sea on 7 November for the first in a series of exercise and weapons-qualifications cruises to the Caribbean. Those at-sea periods occupied her until mid-December when she began holiday standdown and preparations for overseas movement.

On 22 January 1968, Biddle put to sea bound ultimately for the combat zone off the coast of Vietnam. Along the way, she transited the Panama Canal and made stops at Pearl Harbor and Guam before reaching her base of operations at Subic Bay in the Philippines on 24 February. After an availability, the guided-missile cruiser departed Subic Bay for Vietnamese waters on 3 March. She entered port at Danang, South Vietnam, on 5 March and, the following day, was on her way for a PIRAZ (Positive Identification Radar Advisory Zone) station. For the next four months, Biddle alternated between periods at sea—either carrying out PIRAZ duty, serving as an antiair warfare (AAW) picket, or acting as a sea-air rescue (SAR) vessel—with time in port at Subic Bay or Yokosuka, Japan.

On 14 July, the warship completed her final tour of duty off the coast of Vietnam. She returned to Subic Bay for the period 16 to 19 July and then got underway for the voyage home. During the voyage, she completed a circumnavigation of the world and visited such diverse places as Singapore, Lourenco Marques (now Maputo) in Mozambique, the Cape Verde Islands, Lisbon in Portugal, and Copenhagen in Denmark. The warship arrived back in Norfolk on 12 September and remained in port until mid-November. On the 15th, Biddle got underway for missile exercises in the West Indies. She returned to Norfolk on 25 November and remained there through the end of the year.

On 13 January 1969, she got underway from Norfolk bound for Philadelphia. The warship spent five days there for fire fighting and damage control training, returning to Norfolk on 20 January. Biddle's sojourn at Norfolk lasted until 28 March when she put to sea, bound for the Caribbean. While there, the warship conducted tests on recent modifications to her radar and made six missile shoots. Returning to the Hampton Roads area, she loaded missiles, torpedoes, and ammunition at Yorktown, Virginia, on 30 April before reentering Norfolk on 1 May.

On 26 May, Biddle departed Norfolk on her way to the western Pacific. She transited the Panama Canal on 31 May and 1 June and then set a course for Hawaii. The guided-missile cruiser stopped at Pearl Harbor from 10 to 12 June before resuming her voyage. She made a brief stop at Guam for fuel on the 20th and arrived in Subic Bay on 24 June. After a four-day stop, Biddle stood out of Subic Bay on her way to South Vietnam. The warship made a brief stop at Danang on 30 June before relieving the cruiser Chicago on 1 July as strike-support and search-and-rescue ship. The guided-missile cruiser kept watch off the Vietnamese coast for the next month. The only event of note occurred near the end of the month when she rescued several North Vietnamese fishermen adrift in their boat.

Relieved by Chicago on 1 August, Biddle dropped the fishermen off at Danang and then headed for the Philippines. The warship spent a week at Subic Bay and three days at Manila before heading back to Vietnam on 13 August. On 15 August, she relieved Chicago on station in the Gulf of Tonkin. She served as strike-support and search-and-rescue ship until 22 August when she relieved Chicago as PIRAZ (Positive Identification Radar Advisory Zone) ship. The warship alternated between those two tasks until 10 September when she was relieved on PIRAZ station by the destroyer Jouett. The guided-missile cruiser entered Yokosuka, Japan on 14 September, after a brief stop at Subic Bay to disembark her helicopter detachment.

Biddle completed a two-week tender availability on 27 September and departed Yokosuka for the combat zone. Steaming by way of Subic Bay, she arrived back on Yankee Station on 2 October. Between the 2d and the 6th, Commander, Destroyer Squadron (ComDesRon) 3, rode in Biddle and served as antiair warfare coordinator for Task Force (TF) 77. On the 6th, the warship resumed PIRAZ duty, relieving Jouett. For almost a month, she operated alternately as PIRAZ ship and as strike-support and search-and-rescue ship. Relieved by the cruiser Long Beach on 27 October, Biddle put into Hong Kong on 29 October for a six-day liberty call. The guided-missile cruiser departed Hong Kong on 4 November, made a fuel stop at Subic Bay, and then headed back to Vietnam.

She arrived back in the Gulf of Tonkin on 7 November and spent the next six days serving as plane guard for the aircraft carrier Coral Sea. On 13 November, the warship cleared Vietnamese waters. She stopped at Subic Bay from 15 to 18 November and then embarked on the long voyage home. After a brief fuel stop at Guam and a three-day liberty call at San Francisco, California, Biddle arrived in the Canal Zone on 16 December. She completed the canal transit on the 17th and shaped a course for Norfolk. Upon her arrival in Norfolk on 21 December, her crew began a combination post-deployment and holiday standdown.

=== 1970–1971 ===
Biddle spent the first three months of 1970 in port at Norfolk. During that period, she underwent several inspections and received modifications to some of her equipment, notably to her radar. On 13 April, the guided-missile cruiser stood out of Norfolk on a five-week cruise to the Caribbean for training and for technical evaluation of her new and modified radar equipment. She returned to Norfolk on 5 June and remained in the area until the end of July getting ready for her first regular overhaul. She entered the Norfolk Naval Shipyard on 31 July and spent the remainder of 1970 undergoing overhaul.

The guided-missile cruiser completed overhaul in mid-January 1971. On 19 January, she got underway for post-repair trials in the Virginia Capes operating area and returned to port the following day. For the next four months, Biddle spent most of her time in port at Norfolk, getting underway infrequently for brief drill sessions in the immediate vicinity. On 1 June, she departed Norfolk for two months of refresher training in the West Indies. The warship reentered Norfolk on 1 August. For the remainder of the year, Biddle operated out of Norfolk conducting training missions and technical evaluations on equipment. The most notable training mission came late in September when she joined several other Navy ships, a Canadian ship, and a Dutch ship in a NATO seapower review.

=== 1972–1973 ===
The warship began 1972 with several more periods of technical evaluations at sea in January and February. In March, she entered the Norfolk Naval Shipyard to be modified to carry a LAMPS (Light Airborne Multi-Purpose System) helicopter. That work came to a conclusion early in April; and, on 12 April, Biddle departed Norfolk on her way back to southeast Asia. Along the way, she transited the Panama Canal and visited Pearl Harbor and Guam before arriving in Subic Bay on 11 May. On 14 May, the warship put to sea for the combat zone. She entered the zone on 15 May and, the following day, relieved the destroyer Sterett on the northern Search and Rescue (SAR) station. Biddle spent over a month on station operating as a SAR picket and directing antiair warfare before returning to Subic Bay on 26 June.

On Independence Day, the warship got underway for her second tour of duty off Vietnam. After a week on the northern SAR station, she relieved Sterett again on 13 July, but this time as PIRAZ ship. On the night of 19 July, five MiGs attacked Biddle in two raids. In the first raid, the guided-missile cruiser's Terrier missiles destroyed one of the intruders. She claimed a possible kill in the second raid and credited it to her gun batteries. The warship drove off the remaining attackers and suffered no damage herself.

Biddle remained on station serving as either SAR picket or PIRAZ ship until early in August. She visited Hong Kong from 12 to 15 August and was in Subic Bay from 17 to 20 August. The guided-missile cruiser returned to duty on the northern SAR station on 22 August. Thereafter, she again alternated between SAR and PIRAZ assignments until mid-September. Long Beach relieved her for the last time on 17 September, and Biddle unloaded equipment at Subic Bay between 20 and 24 September. On 24 September, she began the long voyage back to Norfolk. Following stops at Guam, Pearl Harbor, and San Diego, she transited the Panama Canal on 22 October and arrived back at Norfolk on 26 October to close out the year in port.

Throughout 1973 and the first five months of 1974, Biddle operated out of Norfolk conducting training missions and technical evaluations. During those operations, she visited not only waters of the western Atlantic but also those of the West Indies and the Caribbean Sea. Late in the fall of 1973, the warship participated in a joint exercise with other elements of the Atlantic Fleet and with ships of the Canadian Navy.

=== 1974 ===
On 14 June 1974, Biddle stood out of Norfolk on her way to the Mediterranean Sea. She arrived in Rota, Spain, on 24 June and relieved the destroyer Conyngham. On 26 June, the warship departed Rota and entered the Mediterranean in company with Task Group (TG) 60.2. After about a month of 6th Fleet operations and port visits, Biddle was dispatched to waters adjacent to Cyprus on 22 July to join in special operations. On 1 August, the warship received orders to the area north of Crete and later operated to the west of that island. On 19 August, the United States ambassador to Cyprus was assassinated; soon thereafter, Biddle joined a special task group off the island to assist in the event of an evacuation of American citizens.

That eventuality did not come to pass, and the special task group was dissolved on 23 August. The guided-missile cruiser then headed for Naples, Italy, where she arrived on 24 August. During the short voyage to Naples the ship was steaming at flank speed, which required the two boiler rooms to be "split", with the forward boiler feeding steam to the forward engine room and the after boiler feeding steam to the after engine room. The forward engine room powered the port propeller. The main feed pump in the forward engine room failed catastrophically, which caused the port propeller to suddenly stop. The ship, still at flank speed from the starboard propeller, turned so sharply to port that seawater sprayed from the ship entered the ship's ventilators. There were no serious injuries to the crew. Biddle remained at Naples until 5 September 1974 at which time she resumed operations the eastern Mediterranean. Between 8 and 10 September, the warship joined in the unsuccessful search for survivors from a TWA Boeing 707 that had crashed in the Ionian Sea. Following that mission, she resumed her schedule of 6th Fleet operations and port visits. After five days at Civitavecchia, Italy, for liberty in Rome, Biddle got underway for the eastern Mediterranean and a transit of the Straits of Bosporus and the Dardanelles. She operated in the Black Sea for five days and retransited the Straits on 11 September. Training exercises and port visits kept her busy until early December. She completed turnover procedures at Rota on 5 December and then put to sea to return to the United States. Biddle arrived back in Norfolk on 14 December and remained in port for the rest of the year.

=== 1975–1976 ===
The warship spent the first three months of 1975 at various locations around Hampton Roads preparing for an extended overhaul. On 15 April, she got underway for Bath, Maine, arriving there on the 18th. The overhaul began immediately and lasted through the end of 1975 and into 1976. On 30 June 1975, Biddle was reclassified a guided-missile cruiser and redesignated CG-34. On 15 March 1976, Biddle got underway for Bayonne, New Jersey, where she arrived on 17 March. At Bayonne, she continued her overhaul in drydock. On 24 April, the guided-missile cruiser left the drydock and, after some tests, headed south to Norfolk. She arrived at Yorktown on the 26th and began loading ordnance. Two days later, the warship reentered Norfolk. During the ensuing four months, Biddle conducted post-overhaul tests, drills, and refresher training along the east coast and in the West Indies.

On 3 September, the guided-missile cruiser departed Norfolk and headed for the waters of northern Europe and the Baltic Sea. She arrived in Scapa Flow, the British naval base in the Orkney Islands located north of Scotland, on 14 September. After a series of amphibious exercises in Norwegian waters, the warship visited Copenhagen, Denmark, from 25 to 28 September. On the latter day, she departed Copenhagen for a further series of multi-national exercises in the Baltic Sea. At the end of those maneuvers, Biddle made port visits at Hamburg in Germany, Antwerp in Belgium, and Cherbourg in France before getting underway for home on 29 October. She arrived back in Norfolk on 9 November and, except for a brief underway period on 18 and 19 November, remained in port for the rest of 1976.

=== 1977–1980 ===
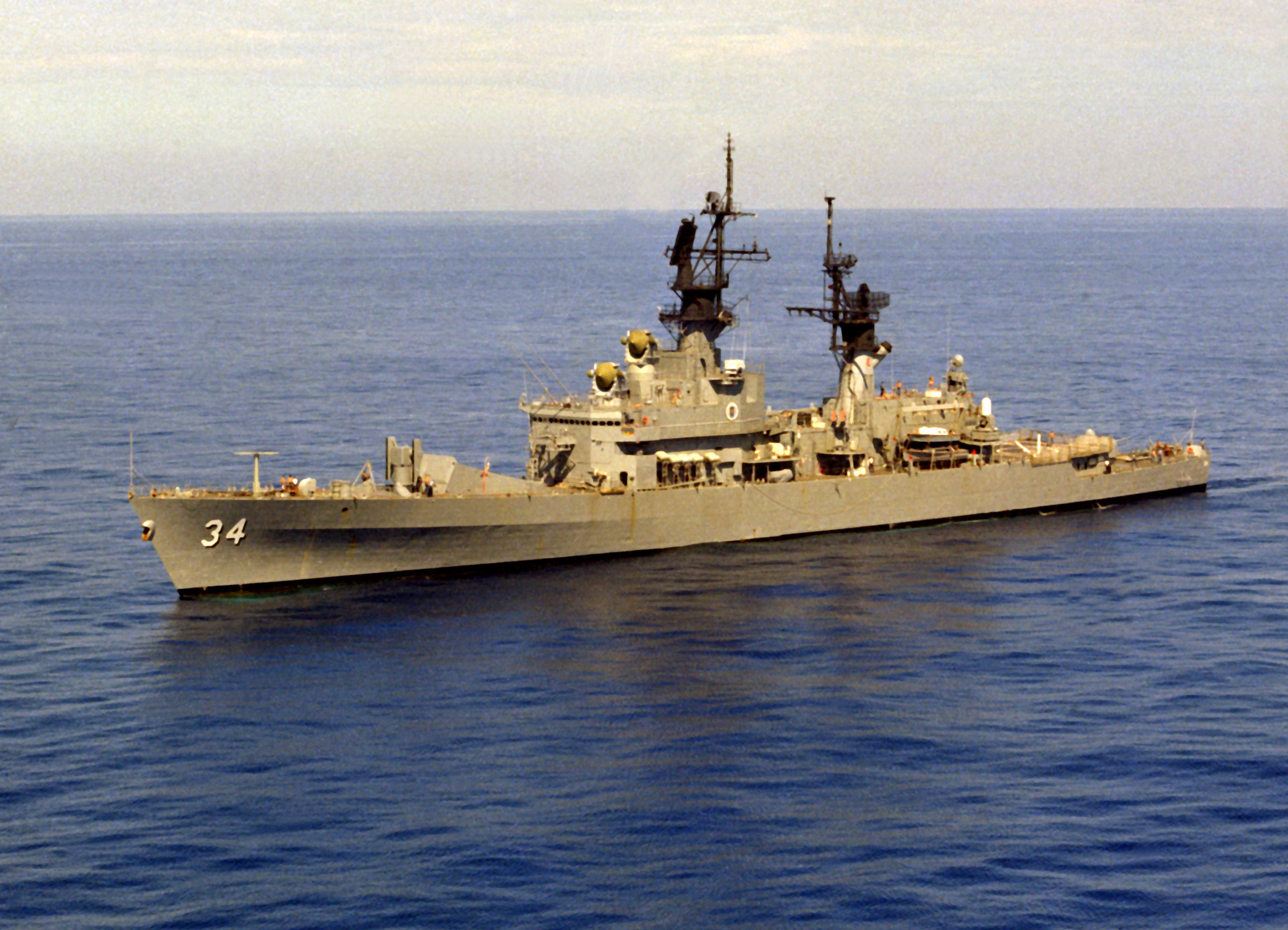
Biddle in the early 1980s.

During the first six months of 1977, Biddle operated out of Norfolk along the eastern seaboard and in the West Indies. Those operations included various drills and exercises as well as evolutions with warships of NATO nations and South American countries. On 11 July, she stood out of Norfolk on her way to join the 6th Fleet in the Mediterranean Sea. That deployment brought visits to ports throughout the Mediterranean basin and a variety of training missions, often conducted in company with units of Allied and friendly navies. She completed the cruise on 22 December when she arrived back in Norfolk.

Over the first nine months of 1978, Biddle operated out of Norfolk. While in port, she underwent a series of inspections and examinations for the purpose of assessing various aspects of the ship's operation. At sea, the warship ranged from the New England coast south to the West Indies participating in multiship exercises, conducting independent ship's drills, and making missile and gun shoots. On 3 October, Biddle exited Chesapeake Bay and embarked upon the third Mediterranean deployment of her career. She arrived in Lisbon Portugal, on 14 October and relieved the cruiser Harry E. Yarnell. On 18 October, the guided-missile cruiser left Lisbon with units of TG 60.2 and entered the Mediterranean.

After about a month of 6th Fleet operations and port visits, Biddle transited the Straits of the Bosporus and the Dardanelles and entered the Black Sea once again. On 22 November, she entered port at Constanta, Romania, to begin what was characterized as a highly successful goodwill visit. The guided-missile cruiser departed Constanta on 27 November and completed her retransit of the Straits on 28 November. She resumed normal 6th Fleet operations, conducting multiship drills and exercises and making goodwill visits to ports in the Mediterranean. That employment carried her into March 1979. She completed turnover procedures between 23 and 25 March and then began the voyage home. The warship arrived in Norfolk on 5 April and spent the rest of the month in post-deployment standdown.

Biddle resumed 2d Fleet operations in May. Over the next three months, she put to sea a number of times to train Naval Academy and NROTC midshipmen. Early in August, she participated in a joint Navy/Air Force electronics warfare exercise. The latter part of the month, she spent at sea taking part in simulated war exercises. Upon her return to Norfolk, Biddle began preparations for her regular overhaul. On 24 September, the guided-missile cruiser departed Norfolk and shaped a course for Philadelphia. She arrived at her destination on 25 September and, three days later, entered the Philadelphia Naval Shipyard to commence her extended repair period. The overhaul lasted more than a year, taking up the remainder of 1979 and apparently all of 1980.

=== 1981–1983 ===
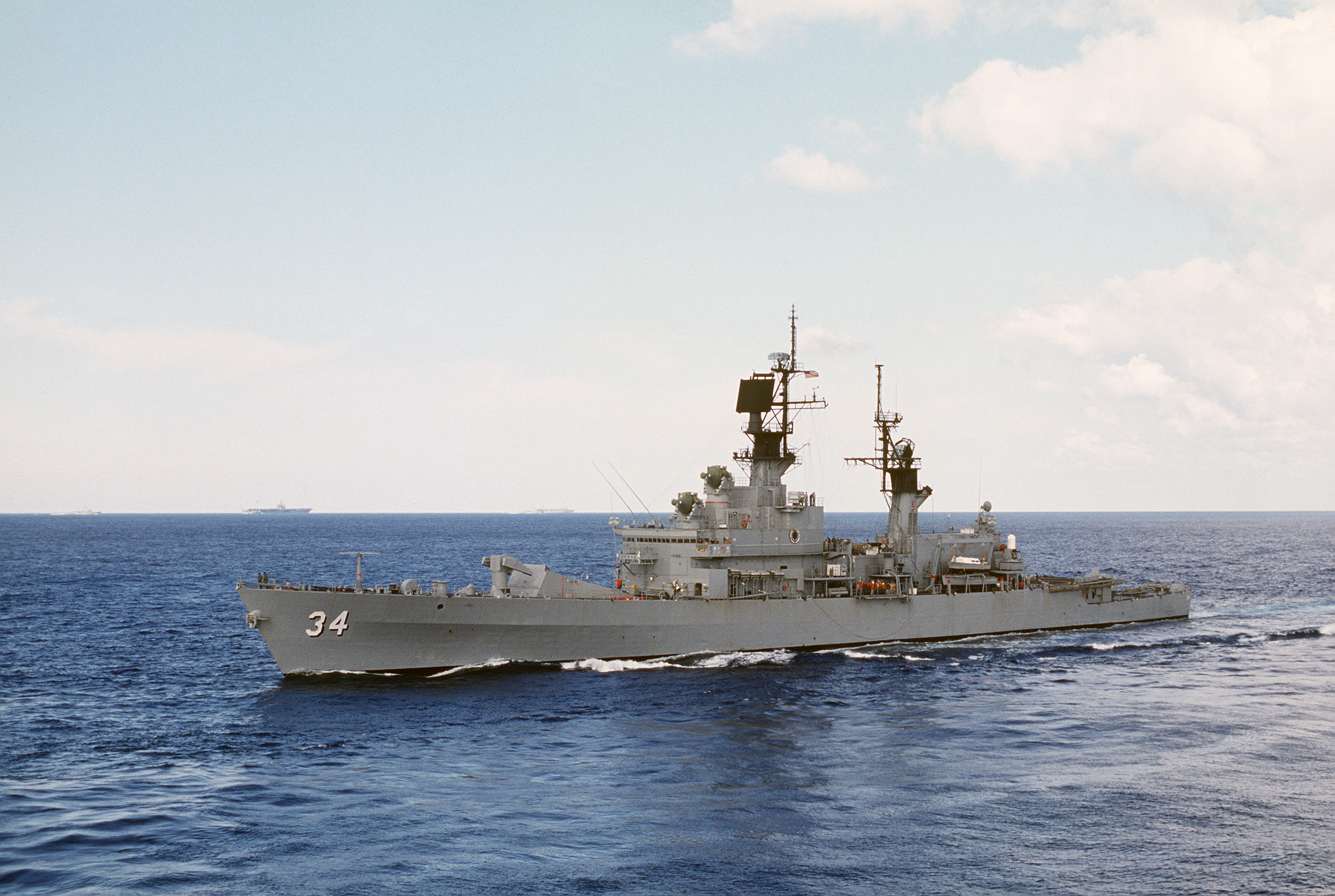
Port bow view of Biddle during the late 1980s.

January 1981 found Biddle conducting post-overhaul shakedown. On 4 February, she stood out of Chesapeake Bay on her way to refresher training in the West Indies. The guided-missile cruiser completed refresher training on 6 April and reentered Hampton Roads on 14 April. During the following three months, Biddle operated out of her home port both in the Virginia Capes operating area and in the West Indies. On 4 August, the warship put to sea for another tour of duty with the 6th Fleet in the Mediterranean. She passed through the Strait of Gibraltar on 11 August. Between 17 and 20 August, she was part of the task group that conducted freedom-of-navigation operations in the Gulf of Sidra off the Libyan coast in defiance of the Libyan leader, Col. Muamar Qaddafi, who claimed sovereignty over the area. During that operation, Soviet-built Libyan Sukhoi Su-7 interceptors fired on American naval aircraft. In response F-14s from the aircraft carrier Nimitz shot down two of the attackers. Later that month, Biddle entered the Black Sea for the third time.

Back in the Mediterranean on 4 September, she resumed normal 6th Fleet operations—multiship exercises and port visits. In mid-October she joined a contingency force off the northern coast of Egypt in the wake of the assassination of President Anwar Sadat. The destroyer Coontz relieved her on 23 October and, after a stop at Rota from 27 to 29 October, Biddle headed home. She arrived back in Norfolk on 8 November and, except for two brief periods at sea early in December, remained in port for the rest of the year.

The first five months of 1982 brought a return to normal operations along the east coast and in the West Indies. On 8 June, the warship embarked upon another deployment to the 6th Fleet. Biddle changed operational control to the 6th Fleet on 18 June. By mid-July, she was on PIRAZ station in the eastern Mediterranean with the contingency force supporting Marine Corps troops ashore in Lebanon. The guided-missile cruiser departed the area in company with the frigate Estocin. After crossing the Aegean Sea and transiting the Straits of the Bosporus and the Dardanelles, the two warships entered the Black Sea on 1 August. They completed their Black Sea operations on 5 August and anchored at Istanbul for a four-day port visit.

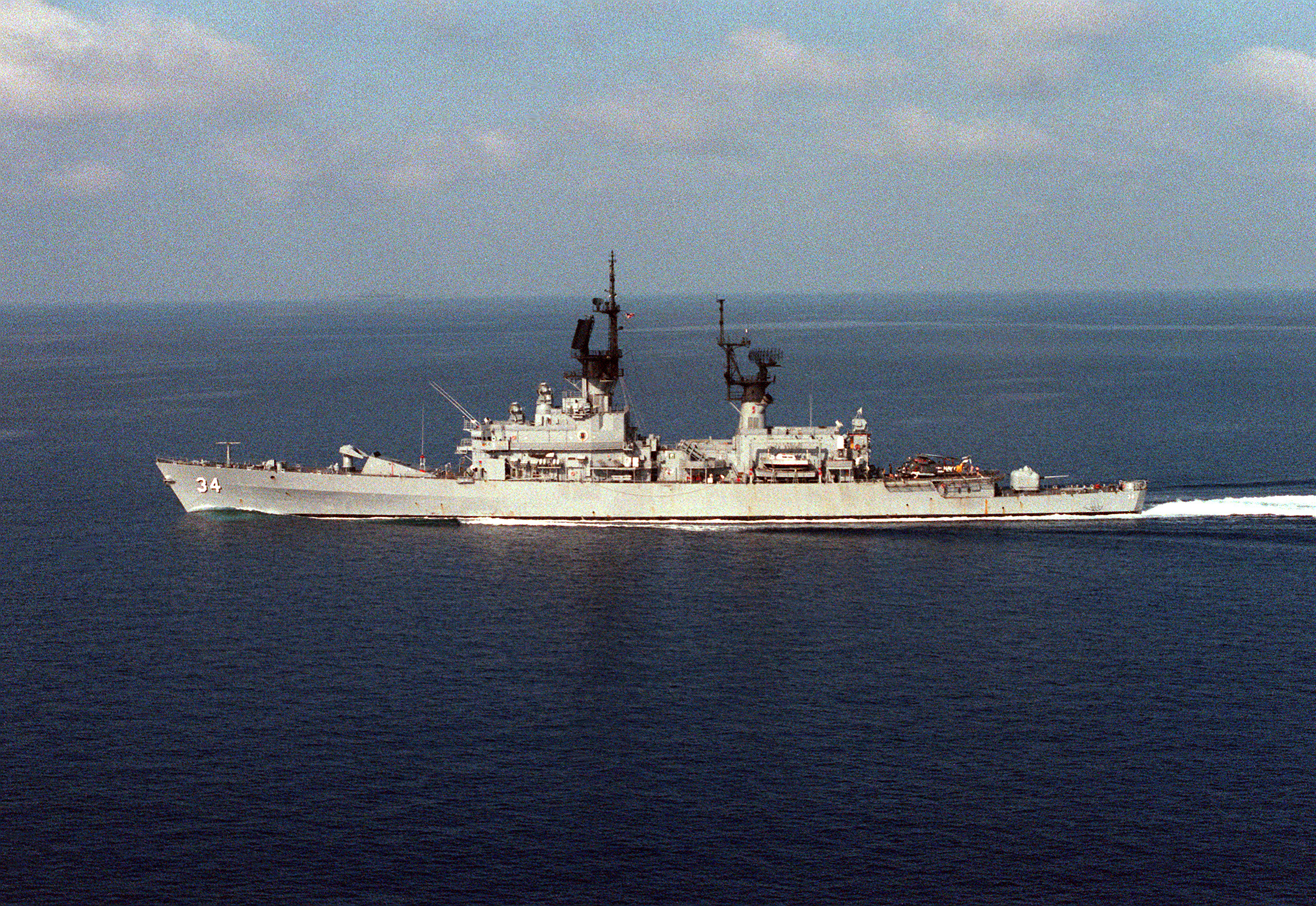
Biddle during Desert Shield.

On 9 August 1982, Biddle and her colleagues headed back to the contingency force off Lebanon. Between 21 and 28 August, she served as escort for Palestinian Liberation Organization refugees leaving Beirut for Tunisia on board the Cypriot merchantman SS Sol Phryne. Port visits and exercises occupied her time until mid-September when the situation in Lebanon began to break down again. Biddle returned to PIRAZ station on 18 September and remained there until 23 November. After a visit to Athens, she moved west to rendezvous with Nimitz for another freedom of navigation operation in the Gulf of Sidra. Biddle then set out for home early in December and reached Norfolk on the 22nd.

The guided-missile cruiser completed post-deployment standdown in mid-January 1983 and resumed operations out of her home port. During the first five months of the year, Biddle operated along the east coast and in the West Indies. On 26 May, the warship put to sea for NATO Exercise "United Effort/ Ocean Safari 83." At the conclusion of that exercise, she commenced a series of port visits alternated with operations in the Baltic Sea. After leaving the Baltic on 7 July, Biddle visited Leith, Scotland, and participated in a joint British-American exercise. Following another four-day visit to Leith, she got underway for home on 26 July. The guided-missile cruiser arrived back in Norfolk on 5 August and resumed normal east coast operations. That employment lasted until 14 October when she began a selected restricted availability at the Norfolk Shipbuilding Co. Those repairs occupied her time for the remainder of 1983.

=== 1985–1986 ===
In October 1985, Biddle deployed for the Mediterranean with the Coral Sea battle group. In November as planned, she detached from the Coral Sea battle group and joined the aircraft carrier Saratoga for a transit through the Suez Canal into the Indian Ocean for the bulk of operations in the North Arabian Sea. The battle group crossed the equator on 10 December 1985 and participating crewmembers became "Shellbacks." During a port visit in early January 1986 at Diego Garcia, British Indian Ocean Territory, the battle group was informed that they needed to get underway on very short notice. Included with replenishment supplies was a videotape of President Reagan's address to the nation blaming Libyan President Muammar al-Gaddafi for connections with Christmas Day airport bombings in Europe. Both Saratoga and Coral Sea were integrated into one carrier battle group.

Three patrols near the "Line of Death" marked in the Gulf of Sidra were largely unremarkable. The fourth patrol resulted in three Libyan patrol boats being attacked and sunk. Just prior, the aircraft carrier America joined the now 3 carrier battle group, with RADM Jeremy "Mike" Boorda commanding the group. Biddle had an opportunity to fire a Harpoon missile, but due to the proximity of other American ships, no attempt was made. For this action against Libya, the battle group was awarded the Navy Unit Commendation. For the most part, Biddle was far from action, instead being primary picket ship for Coral Sea.

Saratoga detached and was replaced by Dwight D. Eisenhower. Coral Sea and her escorts were enjoying what was to be her last port visit prior to leaving the Mediterranean. As the ships left port, it was quickly noticed that the ships were heading in the wrong direction. The 5th patrol off Libya now included Operation El Dorado Canyon, the aerial attacks on Tripoli and terrorist camps near Benghazi. Participating units were awarded the Armed Forces Expeditionary Medal. There was an uneventful 6th patrol. Biddle arrived home to much fanfare at Norfolk, Virginia on Armed Forces Day, May 1986. For the entire period, Biddle and other participating units were awarded the Navy Expeditionary Medal. Since most of the crew earned two different expeditionary medals, they were forced to choose which one to accept.

=== 1986–1988 ===
In July, Biddle made her way to the Philadelphia Naval Shipyard for overhaul. In addition, she would be the first ship to be converted to the New Threat Upgrade, a package to add new weapons technology to older guided missile destroyers and guided missile cruisers. The centerpiece would be the added capability of the Standard Missile 2 – Extended Range system, which added a solid rocket booster to the Medium Range missile and extending maximum range from about 60 miles (97 km) to over 100 miles (160 km). Other radar, sonar and electronics upgrades were installed. Most notably, the forward superstructure was changed to accommodate many of the improvements, also changing the look of the ship. During the second half of 1987 and the first half of 1988, Biddle made numerous trips off Wallops Island, Virginia and the Caribbean to test the new technology, accomplishing many firsts along the way.

== Operations Desert Shield and Desert Storm ==
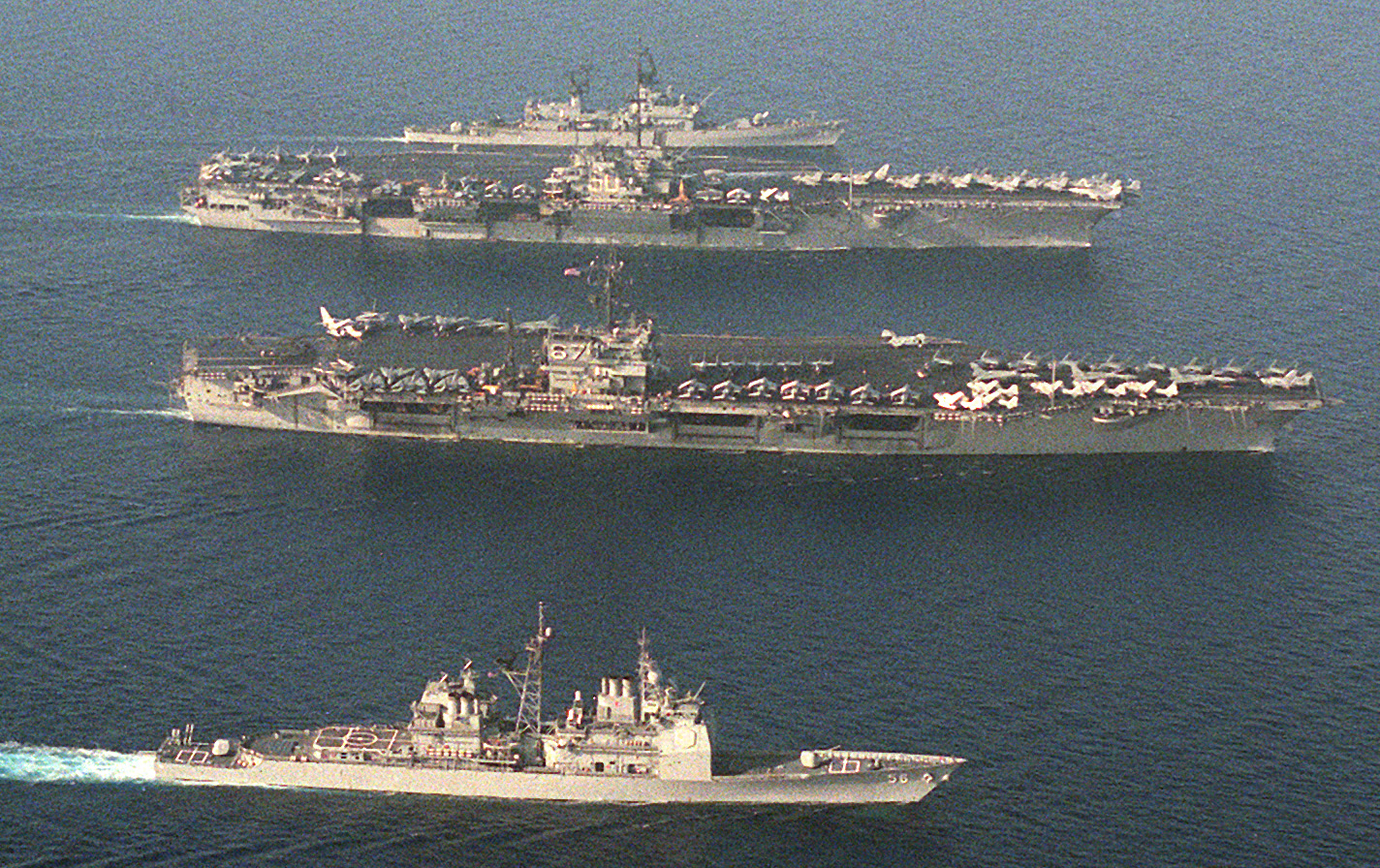
Biddle (top) alongside Saratoga, John F. Kennedy and San Jacinto during Operation Desert Shield.

USS Biddle was deployed to the Middle East in September 1990 as part of Operation Desert Shield, where she joined the Saratoga battle group at the Red Sea. On 12 September she diverted the first merchant ship of the operation. By 4 December, she had made a total of 27 boardings and four diversions, when on that date she suffered a major maneuver casualty when inexplicably her rudder broke off her rudder post and sank to the bottom of the Red Sea. The US Navy flew a replacement rudder, via USAF C-5B aircraft to Toulon, France, where repairs were effected at the French Naval Shipyard. After spending Christmas at Toulon, France, Biddle rejoined the operations, this time to provide antiaircraft support for the two US battle groups on station in the northern Red Sea. By the beginning of Desert Storm the cruiser had boarded 30 freighters. At the end of hostilities, Biddle made another six boardings, and was the only warship to seize a merchant in the war. She left the Red Sea with the highest percentage of diversions of any coalition vessel, with 22.2 percent of her boardings ending with diversions for further inspection.

== Fate ==
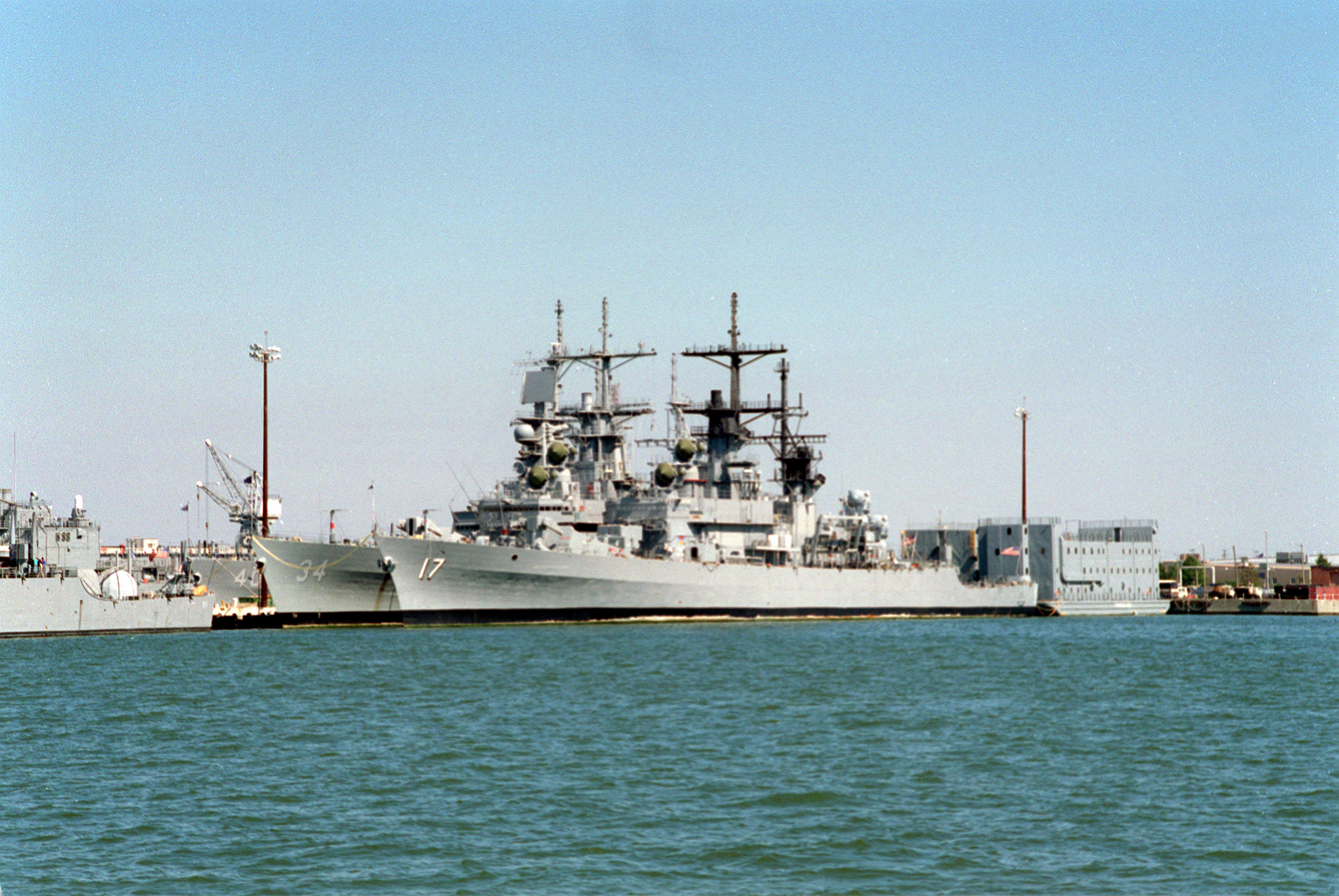
Biddle and Harry E. Yarnell at Norfolk just prior to decommissioning.

The cruiser was decommissioned and stricken from the Naval Vessel Register on 30 November 1993 and sold for scrap to Metro Marine Corporation of Philadelphia on 4 December 2000.
