= USS Chicago (CA-136) =

Heavy cruiser of the United States Navy

Coordinates: 41.8918693°N 87.5986863°W

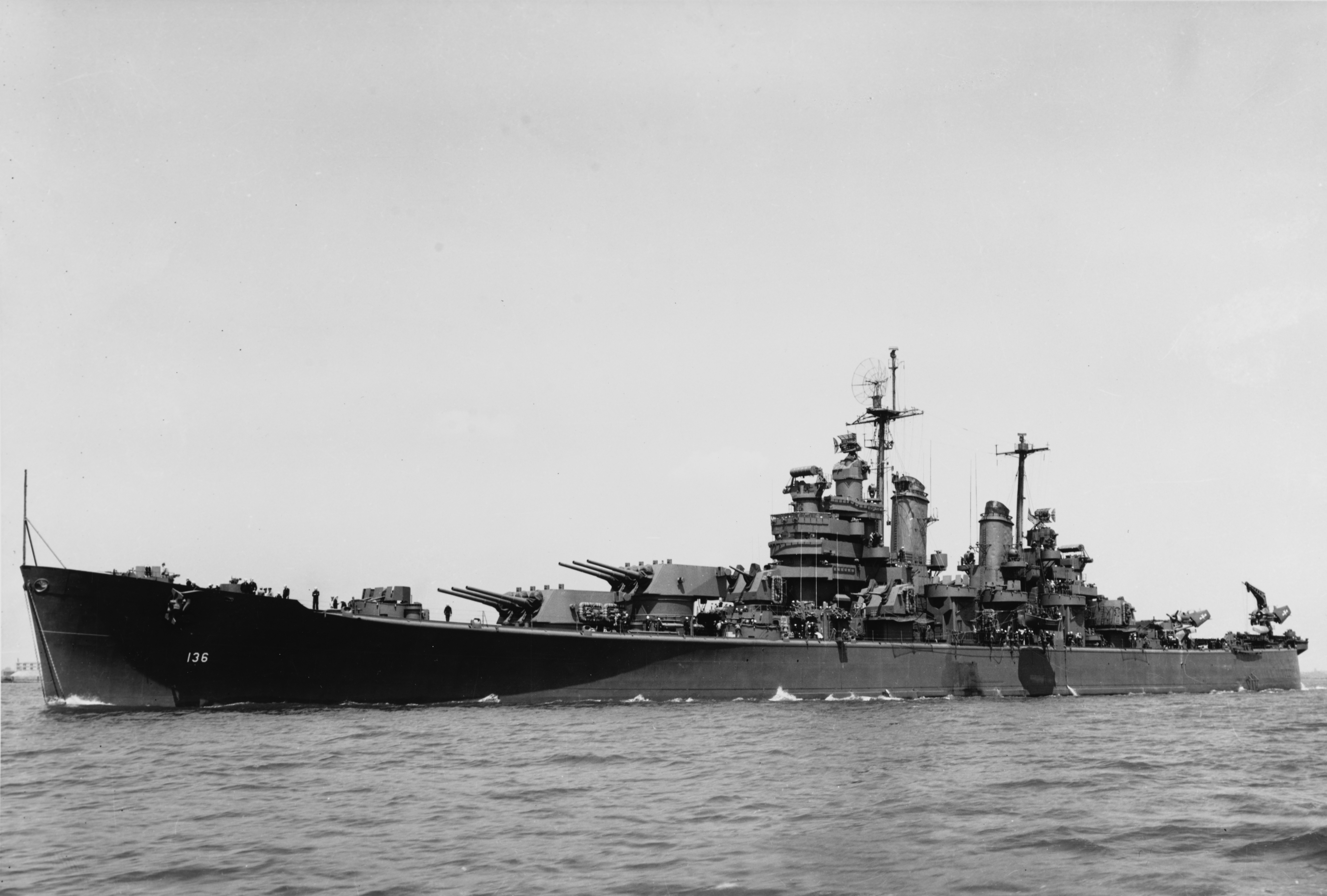
- USS Chicago off the Philadelphia Naval Shipyard on 7 May 1945

History

United States
- Name: Chicago
- Namesake: City of Chicago, Illinois
- Builder: Philadelphia Naval Shipyard
- Laid down: 28 July 1943
- Launched: 20 August 1944
- Commissioned: 10 January 1945
- Decommissioned: 6 June 1947
- Reclassified: CG-11, 01 November 1958
- Recommissioned: 2 May 1964
- Decommissioned: 1 March 1980
- Stricken: 31 January 1984
- Identification: Callsign: NTEF; Hull number: CA-136
- Honours and awards: See Awards
- Fate: Scrapped, 9 December 1991
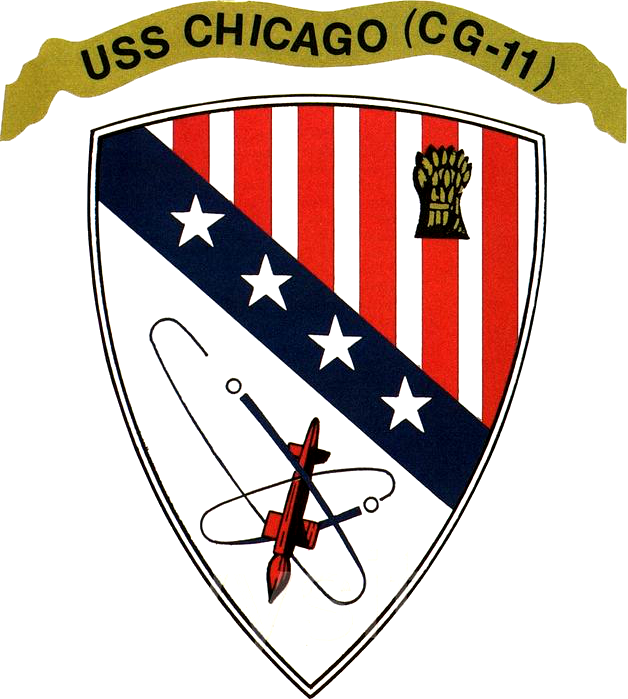
- Badge

General characteristics
- Class & type: Baltimore-class heavy cruiser; Albany-class cruiser
- Displacement: 13,600 tons
- Length: 674 ft 11 in (205.71 m)
- Beam: 70 ft 10 in (21.59 m)
- Draft: 20 ft 6 in (6.25 m)
- Speed: 33 knots (61 km/h; 38 mph)
- Complement: 1,142 officers and enlisted
- Sensors & processing systems: After refit: 1 AN/SPS-10 surface search radar 2 AN/SPS-30 air search radar 1 AN/SPS-43 air search radar 1 AN/SPS-48 air search radar 4 AN/SPG-49 Talos fire control radar 4 AN/SPG-51 Tartar fire control radar 2 Mark 35 gun fire control radar 1 AN/SQS-23 sonar
- Armament: As constructed: 9 × 8"/55 caliber guns 12 × 5"/38 caliber guns 48 × 40 mm guns 22 × 20 mm guns; After refit: 2 × twin RIM-8 Talos SAM launchers (104 missiles) 2 × twin RIM-24 Tartar SAM launchers (84 missiles) 1 × Mk-16 ASROC 8-tube launcher 2 × 5"/38 caliber gun Mk 24 2 × triple Mk-32 torpedo tubes

USS Chicago (CA-136/CG-11) was a Baltimore-class heavy cruiser laid down on 28 July 1943 at Philadelphia, Pennsylvania, US, by the Philadelphia Navy Yard. Launched on 20 August 1944, she was sponsored by Mrs. Edward J. Kelly, wife of the Mayor of Chicago, Illinois, and commissioned at the Philadelphia Navy Yard on 10 January 1945, Captain Richard R. Hartung, USN, in command. She served in some of the last battles around the Japan home islands in WWII, and as part of the post war occupation fleet. Decommissioned after the war, she was refitted as a missile cruiser beginning in the late 1950s and recommissioned in 1964, serving during the Vietnam War. She served until 1980. USS Chicago CG-11 carried the title of "The World's Most Powerful Guided Missile Cruiser".

== World War II ==
Chicago spent her first six weeks preparing for sea duty before departing on 26 February 1945 for Norfolk. After conducting training exercises, and calibrating her compasses in Chesapeake Bay, the cruiser got underway on 12 March for the Gulf of Paria, Trinidad. Arriving on 18 March, the cruiser conducted shakedown training and shore bombardment exercises off Culebra, Puerto Rico, before returning to Norfolk on 11 April. Following inspections and battle problem training, the cruiser sailed to Philadelphia for post-shakedown repair availability on 16 April.

In company with the destroyer Alfred A. Cunningham, the cruiser departed for the Caribbean on 7 May, en route to the Pacific Ocean. Designed to operate offensively with strike and amphibious forces, Chicago spent her transit time conducting various anti-air drills, gunnery exercises, and radar tracking training. After refueling at San Juan, Puerto Rico, on 11 May, the ships spent three days conducting gunnery practice before departing for Colon, Canal Zone, on 15 May. With transit complete the next day, the ships arrived at Pearl Harbor on 31 May.

Following another period of gunnery, day battle, anti-aircraft, and shore bombardment exercises off Kahoolawe Island, the cruiser departed for Eniwetok, Marshall Islands, on 28 June. In company with the battleship North Carolina, Chicago arrived at the atoll on 5 July and immediately refueled from Pan American. Underway that same day, with the destroyer Stockham, added for anti-submarine screen, the ships joined Rear Admiral Radford's Task Group 38.4 north of the Mariana Islands on 8 July.

Added to the anti-aircraft screen, Chicago guarded the Task Group's carriers as they conducted air strikes against the Tokyo Plains area, Honshū, Japan, on 10 July. After refueling on 12 July, the Task Group returned to the Japanese coast and launched air strikes against airfields, shipping, and railways in the northern Honshū and Hokkaidō areas the next day.

On 14 July, in company with the battleships South Dakota, Indiana, Massachusetts, cruiser Quincy, and nine destroyers of Rear Admiral Shafroth's bombardment unit, Chicago closed northern Honshū to bombard the Kamaishi industrial area. At 1212, the cruiser joined the battleships in firing on the iron works and warehouses. Although heavy smoke obscured the target from the cruiser's spotting planes, the combination of pre-plotting the target through photo reconnaissance and radar positioning data allowed Chicago's guns to start fires in numerous buildings, several large warehouses, and among nearby oil tanks. At 1251, the cruiser's secondary battery guns began firing on a Japanese destroyer-escort type vessel. The escort was straddled and hit by 5 in shell fire, began smoking, and retired into the harbor. The Task Force retired at 1426, leaving the port under a pall of black smoke.

The following day, Chicago operated as "a temporary seaplane carrier" when the battleship Iowa transferred her SC Seahawk floatplanes to the cruiser. By hanging one plane over the side with the crane the crew was still able to launch a Seahawk from the catapult for spotting services. After replenishment operations on 16 July, the cruiser resumed screening the carriers as they launched air strikes over the Tokyo Plains, northern Honshū and Hokkaidō, and the Kure-Kobe area over the next two weeks.

On 29 July, in company with King George V and several American battleships, Chicago participated in a night shore bombardment mission against the port of Hamamatsu. Using radar, and assisted by spotting planes dropping flares and rockets, the ships fired at bridges, factories and the rail yard for about an hour. Rejoining the Task Group five hours later Chicago once again screened the carriers as they launched air strikes against the Tokyo-Nagoya area.

Operations with the carriers, including a diversion to the south to avoid a typhoon, continued until 9 August when Rear Admiral Shafroth's bombardment unit returned to Kamaishi. The battleships, joined by Chicago, three more heavy cruisers and a Royal Navy light cruiser detachment, delivered another two-hour bombardment of the town before returning to the carrier task forces.

For the next six days, the cruiser screened the carriers as they launched continuous strikes against the Japanese Home Islands, until 15 August and the Japanese armistice. Chicago remained with the carriers until 23 August, when she departed for Japan. Anchoring in Sagami Wan on 27 August, and then moving to Tokyo Bay on 3 September, the cruiser supported the unloading of supplies and equipment for Third Fleet occupation forces.

== Post-War ==
After transferring 47 men and the Marine Detachment for duty at Yokosuka Naval Base, the cruiser remained in port until 23 October when she got underway for the demilitarization of the Izu Islands. Over the next twelve days, inspection teams helped the Japanese garrison on O Shima and Nii Shima demolish gun emplacements, artillery, ammunition and other military equipment on the islands. Three days later, on 7 November, the cruiser got underway for San Pedro, California.

After arrival on 23 November Chicago received an overhaul at the Long Beach Naval Shipyard, before returning to the Far East. Underway on 24 January 1946, the cruiser arrived in Shanghai on 18 February for occupation duty. She remained there until 28 March as flagship of the Yangtze Patrol, and then sailed to Sasebo, Japan, where she became flagship of Naval Support Force, Japanese Empire Waters. The cruiser visited several other ports in Japan before clearing for the west coast on 14 January 1947. Moved to Puget Sound Naval Shipyard, the heavy cruiser was placed out of commission in reserve on 6 June 1947.

== Rebuilt as missile cruiser ==
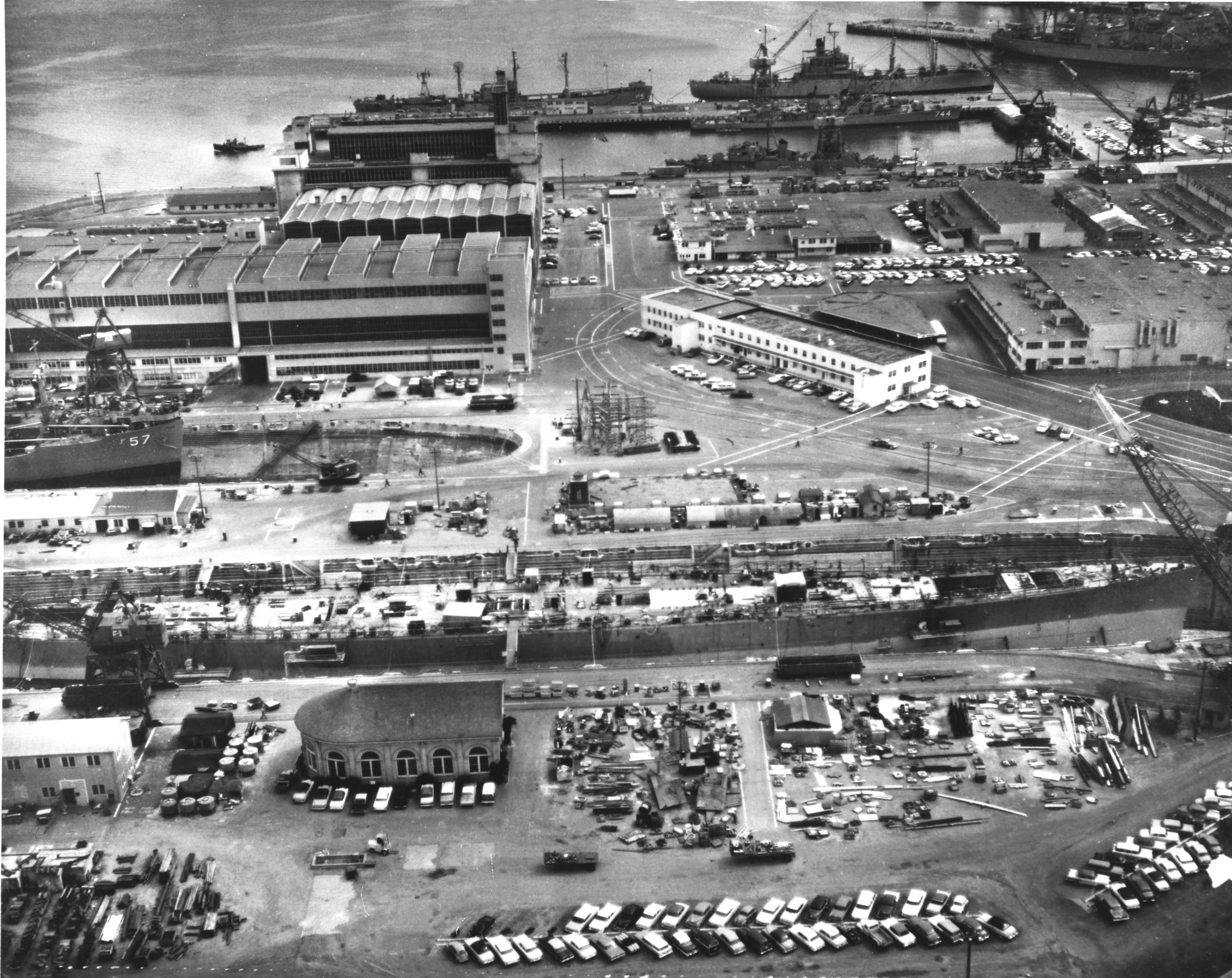
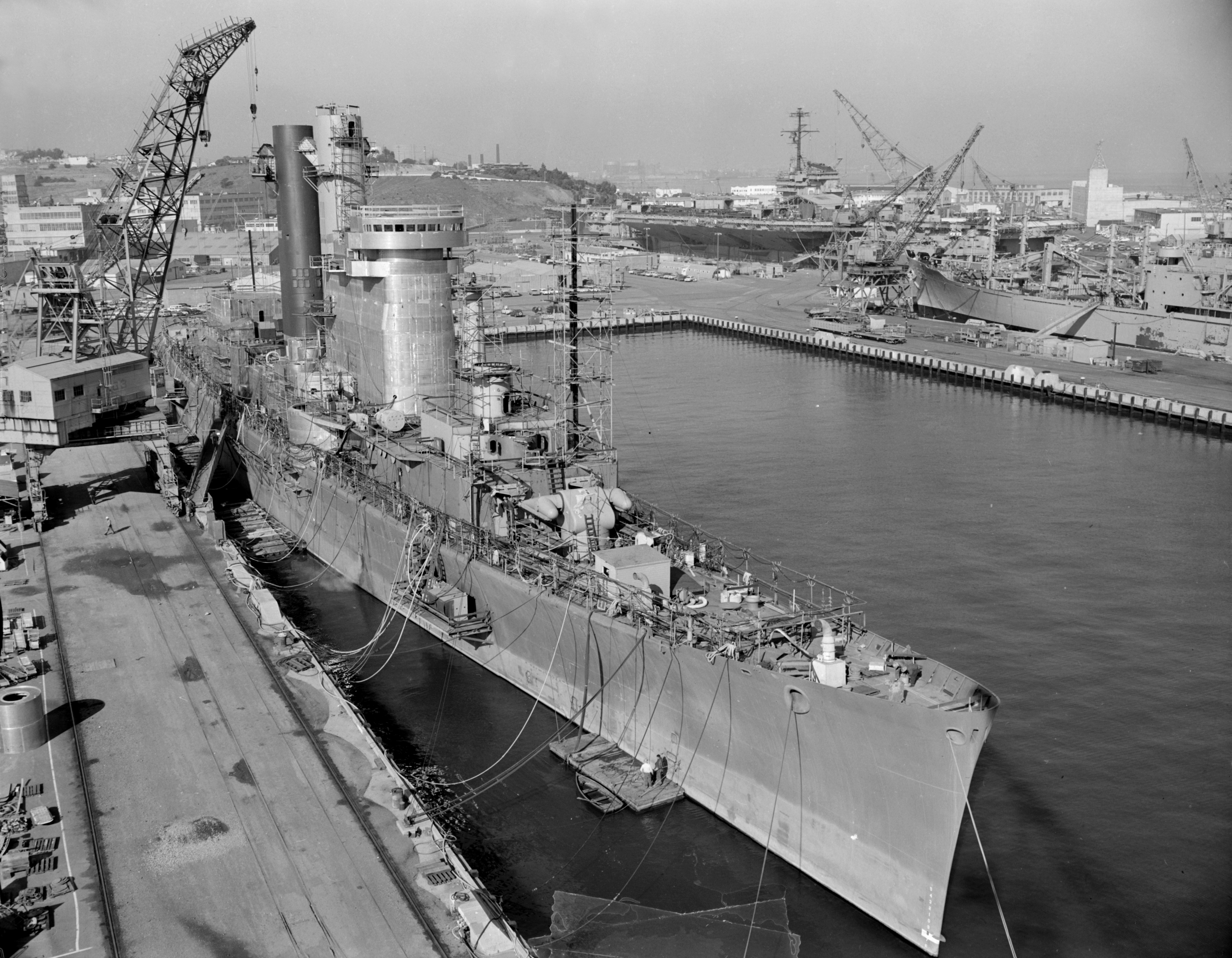
Chicago at two stages during her reconstruction; in 1959 (top), she has been reduced to main deck level, with her superstructure completely removed; in 1960 (bottom) her new superstructure, together with missile emplacements, is being fitted.

On 1 November 1958, Chicago was reclassified CG-11 and towed to San Francisco Naval Shipyard to begin a five-year conversion into a Guided Missile Cruiser. The ship was planned to be one of what became the Albany-class, named for the planned first ship of the class, USS Albany. A total of three ships underwent the major conversion to the new configuration, although Chicago′s conversion took the longest, lasting 13 months longer than Albany and 20 months more than Columbus. Beginning on 1 July 1959, the entire superstructure was removed and replaced with new aluminum compartments, modernized electronic systems, and an improved Naval Tactical Data System (NTDS) equipped combat information center. Representative of the new technological focus on guided missiles, Chicago was refitted with Tartar and Talos SAM stowage, loading, launching, and guidance systems. Two triple torpedo tubes, an ASROC launcher, two 5 in/38 cal guns, and two antisubmarine helicopters rounded out the cruisers' modifications.

Designed to provide long-range air, surface, and sub-surface defense for task forces, Chicago was recommissioned at the San Francisco Naval Shipyard on 2 May 1964, and was assigned to Cruiser-Destroyer Flotilla Nine of the US Pacific Fleet. Preliminary acceptance trials were conducted throughout the summer until 2 September, when Chicago officially joined the 1st Fleet as an active unit. Following sonar calibration and deperming in Puget Sound the cruiser arrived at her home port of San Diego, California, to begin weapons systems qualifications. Examination and evaluation of the new missile systems were completed by 2 December, following successful trials at the Pacific Missile Range off southern California.

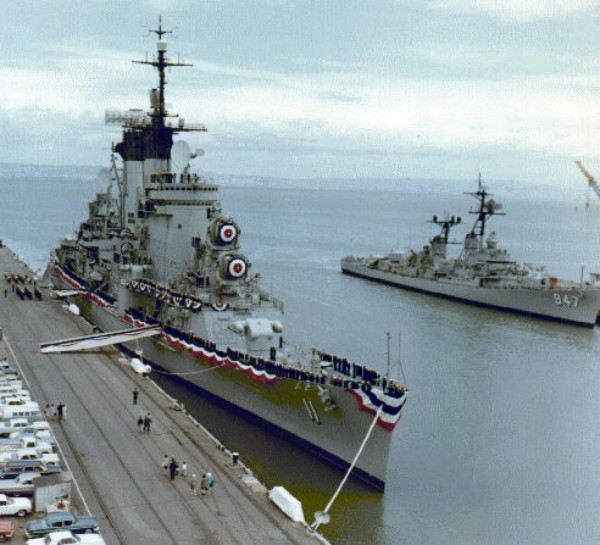
Chicago during her commissioning ceremony in San Francisco in 1964, following her massive, five-year rebuild as a guided missile cruiser

On 4 January 1965, the cruiser shifted to Long Beach, California, to begin a series of shock tests off San Clemente Island. Equipment tests, as well as damage control exercises, were completed by mid-January. Chicago then departed the area for San Francisco for alterations, receiving upgraded Tartar missile systems and improved electronics. The warship returned to San Diego on 17 April.

For the next two months, Chicago continued shakedown training, engineering, navigation, and seamanship drills as well as missile and electronic exercises. In mid-June, the cruiser began Talos fire control developmental testing with the Naval Electronics Laboratory. This, and later tests, examined guidance improvements and experimented with missile replenishment at sea.

During fleet exercise "Hot Stove" in August–September, Chicago practiced anti-air and ASW operations, including firing ASROC and tube-launched torpedoes against submerged "enemy" submarines. Following an ECM exercise Chicago participated in a competitive missile firing exercise and won a gold Missilery "E" for her Tartar battery. During the first week of October the warship participated in another anti-air exercise, this time shooting down two high-speed, high-altitude drones with Talos and Tartar missiles.

After a cruise to Hawaii from 19 October to 3 November, during which the cruiser practiced tactical data sharing training with the aircraft carrier Kitty Hawk and destroyer Mahan, the ship finished out the year conducting tests and exercises in the San Diego area. Local operations continued in the spring, including more missile evaluation tests through February 1966. Returning to San Diego on 4 March the ship underwent operational readiness, technical proficiency, boiler, electronics, and nuclear warfare acceptance inspections. In April, the warship participated in Exercise "Gray Ghost," where the cruiser operated as tactical flagship for the anti-air warfare commander, Rear Admiral Elmo R. Zumwalt, Jr.

== 1st Vietnam deployment ==
On 12 May 1966, Chicago got underway for her first Vietnam deployment. After stopping at Pearl Harbor and Yokosuka, where a new radar antenna was installed, the ship arrived at U.S. Naval Base Subic Bay on 12 June. Picking up her helicopter detachment the cruiser departed the next day for duty with Task Force 77 on Yankee Station in the Tonkin Gulf.

From 15 June to 13 July, Chicago, call-sign Red Crown, began evaluating the concept of radar surveillance of all U.S. Navy air operations over designated areas of the Gulf and North Vietnam. Known as PIRAZ, for "positive identification and radar advisory zone", the initial duties of tracking friendly aircraft was expanded to include Air Force planes, controlling barrier combat air patrols, advising support aircraft, and coordinating strike information with the Air Force reporting center at Da Nang, South Vietnam. On 5 July a Sikorsky SH-3 Sea King search and rescue helicopter operating from Chicago rescued an A-4E Skyhawk pilot from Constellation who had ejected off the coast of North Vietnam on 4 July. After a port visit to Hong Kong, where the ship had to avoid a typhoon on 17 July.

On her second PIRAZ tour, from 29 July to 11 August, Chicago assumed the duties of anti-air warfare commander for short periods of time and demonstrated the ability of a CG to track complex air operations. After a practice Talos missile shot off Okinawa on 27 August, and a short visit to Keelung, Taiwan, the ship returned to PIRAZ station on from 7 September to 29 September. The cruiser, expanding air duties once again, soon became the primary source for MIG warning information, and assumed surveillance responsibility for the North Vietnamese-Chinese border. On her fourth PIRAZ tour, from 25 October to 12 November, the cruiser helped improve these procedures, particularly in the area of joint Air Force-Navy cooperation.

En route to Sasebo, via Subic Bay, the cruiser stopped at the Okinawa Missile Range to fire two more practice missiles on 18 November. Arriving in Japan on 19 November, the ship visited Yokosuka before departing for home on 27 November. Sailing in rough seas, the ship completed the non-stop voyage on 7 December. The cruiser remained at San Diego for the remainder of the year.

Starting in January 1967, the cruiser settled into the busy routine of training, exercises, and inspections. Underway for such widely divergent responsibilities as providing guest cruises for the Secretary of the Navy, serving as First Fleet flagship, and air warfare exercises with USS Constellation, the cruiser spent the first five months of the year off California. In both April and May, Chicago conducted experimental Talos missile tests against surface targets to demonstrate missile versatility.

Following readiness inspections, the cruiser departed 6 June for an Alaskan cruise with Commander First Fleet. Arriving in Juneau, Alaska, on 10 June, the ship paid an official visit to that city before returning to San Diego eleven days later. After another fleet exercise in July, where Chicago's Talos battery scored a direct hit on a drone at a range of 96 miles, the cruiser spent August conducting official visits to Seattle, Washington, Vancouver, and Esquimalt, British Columbia.

== 2nd Vietnam deployment ==
Assigned to tender availability on 1 September, the ship received boiler and other repairs and inspections from Isle Royale before departing for another WestPac deployment on 11 October 1967. After departing Pearl Harbor on 18 October, the warship assisted in vectoring aircraft to the site of a Navy F-8 Crusader crash site, successfully rescuing the pilot. Arriving on station in the Gulf of Tonkin three weeks later, via Yokosuka, Okinawa, and Subic Bay, the ship relieved the cruiser Belknap, beginning PIRAZ duties from 12 November to 14 December. These responsibilities, improved over the past year, included radar surveillance, coordinating barrier CAP and rescue operations, providing MiG and border warnings, and a wide variety of communication and real-time data sharing services.

After a visit to Hong Kong from 16 to 21 December, the cruiser moved to Subic Bay for an import availability period completed on 3 January 1968. Chicago steamed to Singapore, for a short rest period, before returning to the PIRAZ station from 13 January until 28 January, when following the seizure of Pueblo by North Korea, the cruiser steamed to the Sea of Japan to help coordinate air activities for the carriers of Task Group 70.6 as part of Operation Formation Star. On 7 February, as the crisis eased, Chicago departed to resume PIRAZ duties in the Gulf of Tonkin from 12 February to 6 March.

Following a final PIRAZ cruise from 23 March to 17 April, Chicago departed Subic Bay on 1 May and arrived in San Diego on 15 May, via Guam and Pearl Harbor. After a brief diversion to the Pacific Missile Range, to conduct experimental aircraft tracking and missile firings, the cruiser entered Long Beach Naval Shipyard on 1 July for a regular repair period followed by machinery and electronics sea trials and inspections for the remainder of 1968.

== 3rd Vietnam deployment ==
On 31 January 1969, Chicago concluded her missile systems qualifications tests, including a Talos test firing against a missile drone, before departing for her third cruise to the Western Pacific on 13 February. The cruiser underwent ten days of upkeep and type training at Subic Bay before assuming duties as PIRAZ ship on 11 March. Twelve days later, the ship began additional Search and Rescue (SAR) duty in the Gulf. This involved maintaining two helicopters on patrol station to provide rescue coverage for Naval aircraft reconnaissance missions.

On 17 April, Chicago was ordered to proceed to the Sea of Japan, off Korea, for duty with Task Force 71. In response to the shooting down of an EC-121 by North Korean fighters on 14 April, that killed all 31 personnel on board, the Task Force patrolled the Sea of Japan during the crisis that followed. The cruiser provided PIRAZ and screening duties for the carriers, and their constant air patrols, until 27 April when the ship departed for upkeep at Sasebo, Japan.

Following repairs, Talos and Tartar missile tests at the Okinawa missile range, and picking up a group of midshipmen at Da Nang on 23 May, Chicago conducted another long PIRAZ/SAR tour from 23 May to 1 July. After upkeep at Yokosuka, a visit to Hong Kong, and a typhoon evasion, the cruiser returned to the Gulf of Tonkin on 1 August to continue radar surveillance, electronic countermeasures, and missile screen duties. Departing 25 August, the cruiser returned, via Subic Bay, Guam, and Pearl Harbor, to San Diego on 17 September.

After a leave and upkeep period, followed by a tender availability that installed Zuni chaff dispensers, the cruiser finished out the year conducting routine inspections, local training exercises, and operations at the missile test range. Author T. J. Jackson Lears was a communications officer aboard Chicago at this time. Chicago, still serving as United States First Fleet flagship for Vice Admiral Isaac C. Kidd, Jr., began the new year quietly, with team training at the Fleet Anti-Submarine Warfare school in San Diego. Several fleet exercises, two missile firing tests, and inspections filled the months until 12 June 1970, when the cruiser underwent a two-week repair and alteration period. All four Talos fire control systems were upgraded to include anti-ship targeting and an experimental video target tracker was installed. Communications security, nuclear safety, and operational readiness inspections, as well as final engineering checks, were completed by the end of August.

== 4th Vietnam deployment ==
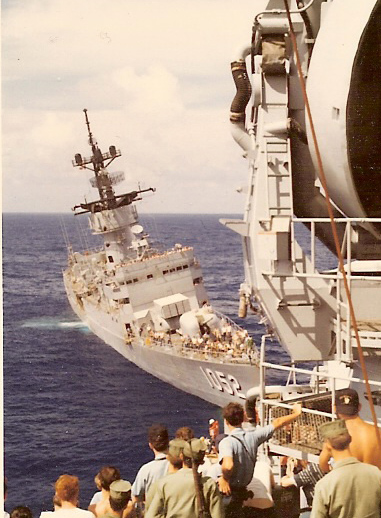
Knox is taken in tow by Chicago after being disabled by a fire en route from Guam to Hawaii.

Despite cutbacks that had substantially lowered her crew component, the cruiser sailed for Vietnam on 9 September 1970. Arriving on station on 3 October, Chicago conducted PIRAZ and search coordination duties with evasive maneuvering to avoid super typhoons Joan and Kate between 14 and 26 October. After a 27 October refueling accident injured several men, Chicago left the Gulf of Tonkin on 1 November and Captain Stanley Thomas Counts assumed command before the ship arrived in Yokosuka on 7 November. Chicago departed Yokosuka on 17 November and resumed PIRAZ station from 20 November to 19 December. Chicago spent Christmas 1970 in Hong Kong and celebrated the new year in Subic Bay. Chicago left Subic Bay on 11 January and resumed PIRAZ station until 18 February. Chicago departed Subic Bay en route to San Diego on 24 February escorted by the frigate Knox. Knox rescued a Chicago sailor who jumped overboard on 26 February; he thought it would get him discharged. After refueling in Guam on 27 February, Knox suffering a loss of power due to a JP-5 fire in engineering on 3 March. Chicago took Knox in tow until a fleet tug arrived at the scene from Pearl Harbor on 5 March.

Upon arrival in San Diego on 11 March, the cruiser began a post-deployment leave and upkeep period. Supply replenishment, inspections, and a midshipmen's cruise in June and July, were followed by exercises, inspections, and a dependent-guest cruise into October.

== 5th Vietnam deployment ==
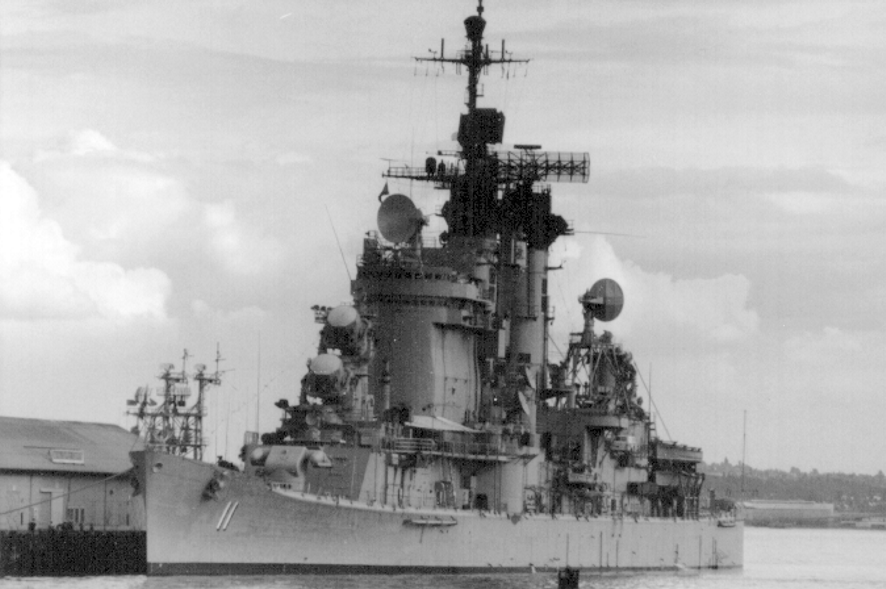
Chicago moored in Seattle during the 1971 midshipman cruise.

After a final readiness test and embarking five guests of the Secretary of the Navy, Chicago departed for another deployment on 6 November 1971 under the command of Captain Thomas William McNamara. After a weekend stop at Pearl Harbor, where the passengers were debarked, the ship stopped at Guam and Subic Bay before arriving in the Gulf of Tonkin PIRAZ station on 6 December. Chicago left PIRAZ station on 28 December to celebrate the new year in Singapore, and briefly crossed the equator on 4 January for a line-crossing ceremony at 105° 30′ east. Chicago then spent a week in Subic Bay before resuming PIRAZ station from 18 January to 10 February. Chicago launched four RIM-8H Talos-ARM anti-radar homing missiles against North Vietnamese shore-based radar stations in February and March, but no hits were registered. After a few days in Subic Bay, radar surveillance and air coordination continued on PIRAZ station from 3 March until leaving on 21 March to visit Hong Kong. The cruiser set course for San Diego before being recalled to PIRAZ station on 3 April 1972 in response to the North Vietnamese Army's invasion of the south.

The scale of U.S. air operations increased dramatically as strike and interdiction missions, designed to restrict the movement of men and supplies, were conducted throughout North Vietnam. The cruiser monitored all aircraft flying over the gulf, directed friendly CAP, and, despite intense electronic jamming, coordinated fighter escorts during the mid-April B-52 Stratofortress raids against the North Vietnamese. By maintaining a complete air picture, Chicago vectored damaged bombers around enemy missile sites, set up tanker rendezvous points for planes low on fuel, and directed helicopters on rescue operations. The cruiser also directed friendly fighters against North Vietnamese aircraft. In April and May, Chicago's air intercept controllers directed Navy and Air Force aircraft on CAP missions that were credited with 14 MiGs shot down. Among these was the second MiG downed by Navy aces Randy Cunningham and William P. Driscoll.

Chicago's forward Talos battery downed a MiG at long-range during the mining of Hai Phong harbor on 9 May. Chicago and the cruiser Long Beach were given the unusual assignment of protecting A-6 Intruder and A-7 Corsair aircraft mining Hai Phong harbor at low altitude during Operation Pocket Money. To avoid exposing F-4 Phantom fighters to North Vietnamese ground-based anti-aircraft defenses, these ships patrolling offshore were given a free-fire zone for Talos missiles to engage defending MiG fighters approaching the coast from Phúc Yên and Kép airfields near Hanoi. Chicago came under fire from North Vietnamese coastal artillery batteries, but was able to maintain missile envelope coverage while moving out of gun range before suffering any damage. After a month of surveillance and directing air strikes against Hai Phong harbor traffic, Chicago finally departed for San Diego on 21 June 1972.

== Post-Vietnam ==
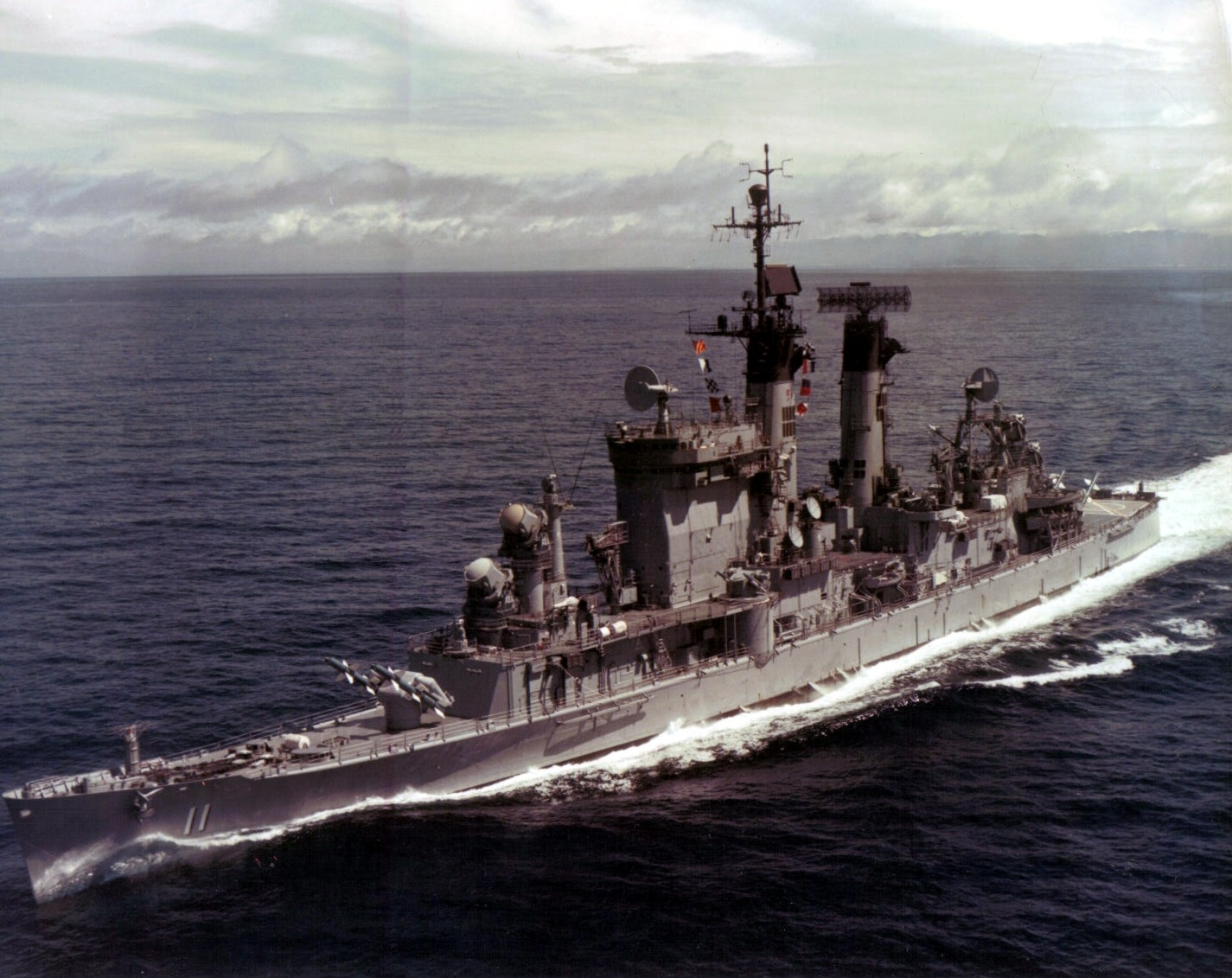
Chicago in early 1970s

Arriving home on 8 July, the ship underwent a local availability before entering Long Beach Naval Shipyard on 25 August for a Complex Overhaul. During this refit, Chicago received new digital fire control systems, replacing the old analog computers, installed new missile launchers, and expanded her electronics equipment.

On 15 May 1973, Chicago began carrying out six months of sea trials, tests, and training evolutions. New equipment and combat coordination procedures were also implemented, extending the cruiser's operational readiness date to 14 December. Finally, after refresher training, fleet exercises, and weapons load-out, the cruiser departed for another WestPac deployment on 21 May 1974. After arrival at Subic Bay on 15 June, the ship prepared for an extended cruise with the frigate Fanning, destroyer George K. MacKenzie, and auxiliary vessel Passumpsic. Designed to counter the Soviet Navy's presence in Somalia and Aden on the Indian Ocean, the low-key port visits were intended to demonstrate that "the Indian Ocean is not a Russian lake".

Departing Subic Bay on 25 June, the squadron passed through the Straits of Malacca on 2 July and arrived at Karachi, Pakistan six days later. Underway on 13 July, Chicago and her escorts began a monthlong at-sea period, "showing the flag" in the Arabian Sea and the Gulf of Aden, before arriving at Mombassa, Kenya on 9 August. A week later, in an effort to influence Russian negotiations for basing rights in the Mauritius Islands, the squadron conducted a diplomatic port visit to Port Louis. Toward this end, Chicago embarked several Mauritian government officials on 21 August for a two-day cruise to Rodrigues Island. Departing on 23 August, the ships returned to Subic Bay, via Singapore, for upkeep on 11 September.

Following a visit to Hong Kong in early October, the cruiser spent the next month conducting training and fleet exercises in the Philippines area until getting underway for Guam on 17 November. After a week at Apra Harbor, the ship departed on 29 November for San Diego. Arriving home on 14 December, the ship remained in port for leave, repairs, and upkeep into March 1975. Technical inspections and equipment modifications, interspersed with a visit by a delegation of French officials, lasted until April when the ship conducted interim refresher training in the southern California operating areas.

Following a series of missile tests in late May, and fleet exercises with Pacific naval units, the cruiser visited Seattle for the Fourth of July celebrations. After a visit to Vancouver the following week, Chicago returned to San Diego to begin overhaul preparations. From 9 September to 24 October, the cruiser underwent a major restricted availability as repairs were conducted to fuel tanks, boiler casings, and the main propulsion plant. Additional upkeep, tender availability, and type training continued through the new year as the cruiser prepared for another deployment. In February 1976, personnel in the Operations department underwent extensive team training in anti-air, anti-submarine, and electronic warfare in preparation for a fleet exercise in March. That operation, exercise "Valiant Heritage", took place from 2–11 March with forces from Canada, the United Kingdom, New Zealand, and the United States.

Following a month in port, and several service inspections, Chicago left San Diego on 13 April to deploy to the Western Pacific. Sailing with an amphibious group the cruiser conducted multi-ship exercises, both before and after Pearl Harbor, and arrived at Yokosuka on 3 May. Task group exercises with the aircraft carrier Midway, "Multiplex 2-76" from 19 to 25 May and "Multiplex 3-76" in the South China Sea from 4–7 June, and port visits to Subic Bay and Keelung, occupied Chicago through June. After a midshipmen cruise from Yokosuka to the Philippines in early July, the cruiser began an import period lasting until 2 August.

On 4 August, the cruiser participated in "Multiplex 1-7T", followed by a successful missile firing exercise off Poro Point, Luzon on 7 August. Returning to Subic Bay for two weeks of upkeep, the cruiser sailed for Hong Kong on 22 August. Arriving three days later, after avoiding a third typhoon, the ship spent six days in that liberty port. Leaving Hong Kong on 31 August, Chicago joined rendezvous with Enterprise for a war-at-sea exercise lasting until 8 September, before returning to Subic for a lengthy upkeep period. Repainting the exterior, and interior improvements lasted until 27 September, when the cruiser got underway for home. Stopping at Guam on 1 October to refuel, and Pearl Harbor on 9 October for a dependents cruise, the ship finally returned to San Diego on 16 October.

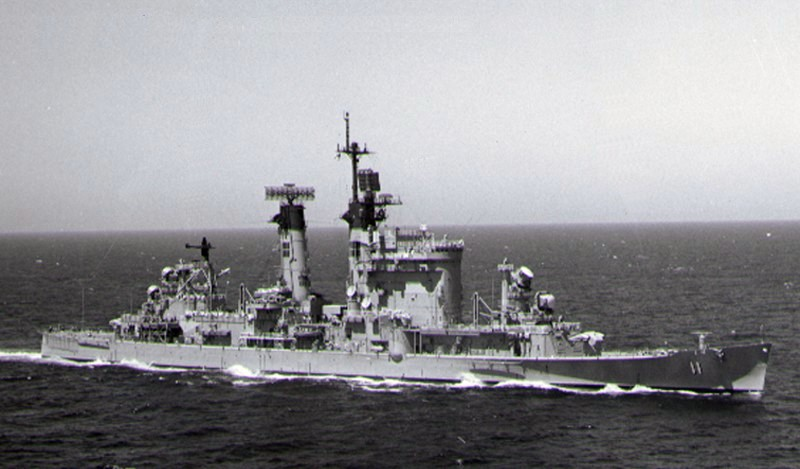
Chicago at sea during her 1977-78 WESTPAC cruise

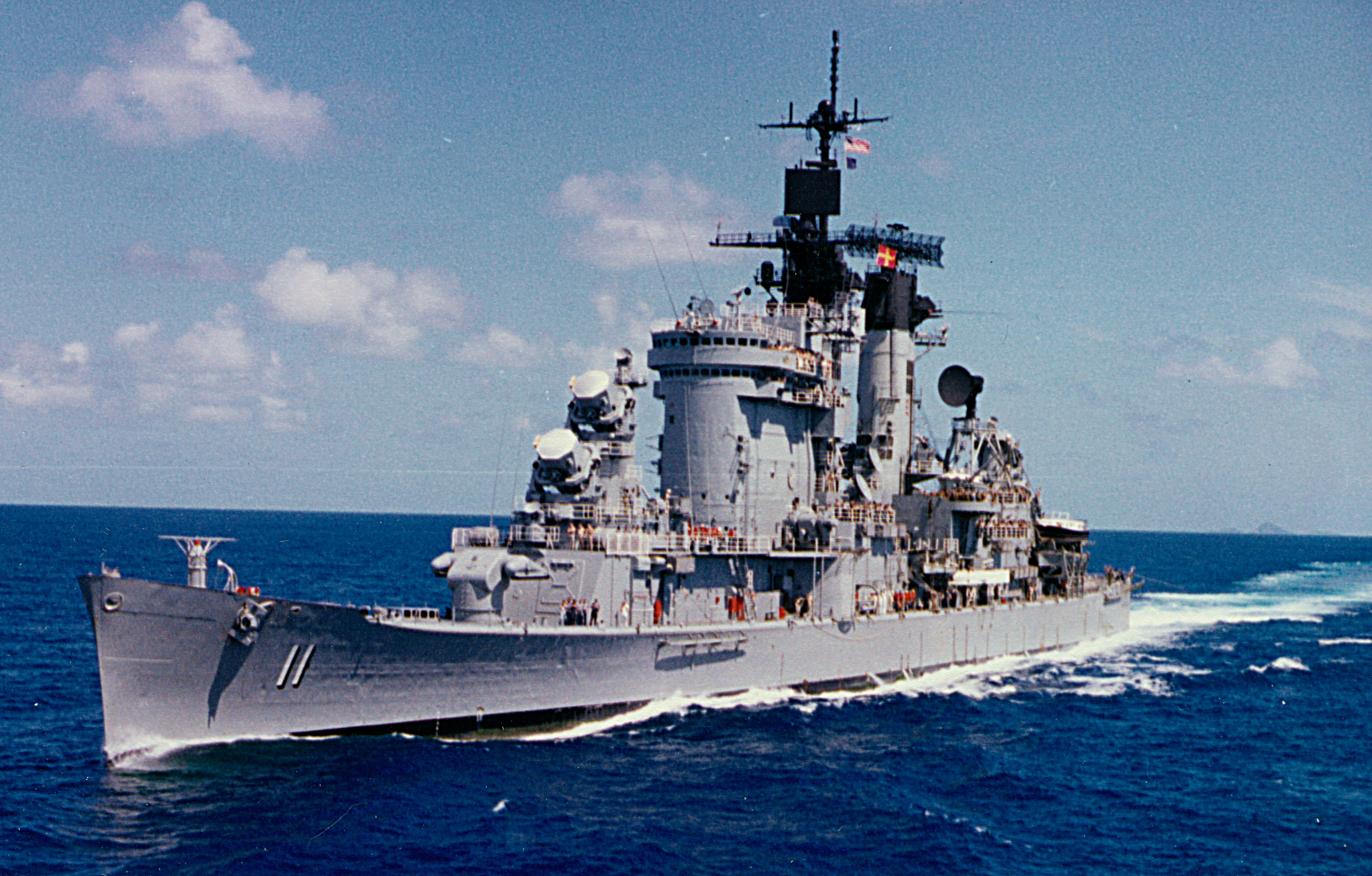
Chicago in the Coral Sea, October 1979

The cruiser remained in port, receiving boiler repairs and equipment upgrades, until 23 February when the ship began post-repair sea trials and crew training. Following inspections, and ordnance loadout at Seal Beach on 3 March, Chicago began a regular schedule of training operations out of San Diego. These exercises, including helicopter pad training, simulated missile and torpedo attacks, and other similar drills, continued until 6 September, when the ship got underway for her eighth WestPac tour.

Chicago arrived in Subic Bay on 30 September, after multi-ship exercises that included four missile shots while underway, to begin a series of operations with the 7th Fleet. Missile shots and convoy exercises off Mindoro, a barrier exercise off Buckner Bay, and visits to Yokosuka, Keelung, and Hong Kong lasted until late November. On 4 December, after a rendezvous with Kitty Hawk, the cruiser began operations in the Sea of Japan. Helicopter and underway replenishments were interrupted two days later, when the formation was circled by two Soviet Tupolev Tu-16 "Badgers", but exercises continued until 8 December. Departing the area, Chicago steamed south to Subic Bay, for sonar exercises with the submarine Queenfish, arriving at Singapore on 23 December. After the holidays, the cruiser moved to Phattaya Bay, Thailand on 30 December.

Departing 4 January 1978, the cruiser visited Subic Bay and Hong Kong before starting a month of exercises in the Philippine Sea. Gunfire exercises, helicopter operations, unreps, and other drills, including a real man overboard rescue on 28 February, lasted until 4 March, when Chicago moored at Manila. After repairs and upkeep, the ship steamed for Guam on 16 March, arriving five days later to refuel, before arriving in Pearl Harbor on 31 March.

After returning to San Diego on 7 April, the ship remained in upkeep status until 24 July 1978, when the cruiser moved to Long Beach to start a regular overhaul. Repairs at the Long Beach Naval Shipyard lasted until 18 October, when the cruiser conducted two days of sea trials. Finishing work continued until 25 October, when Chicago departed the shipyard. After two days of operations with the destroyer England and submarine Darter, the cruiser moved back to San Diego to begin a regular schedule of training exercises. These short cruises, concentrating on gunnery and underway training, lasted through February 1979. A number of propulsion and electronic service inspections were also conducted. On 5 March, during exercises off southern California, the cruiser also earned her eleventh consecutive Missile "E".

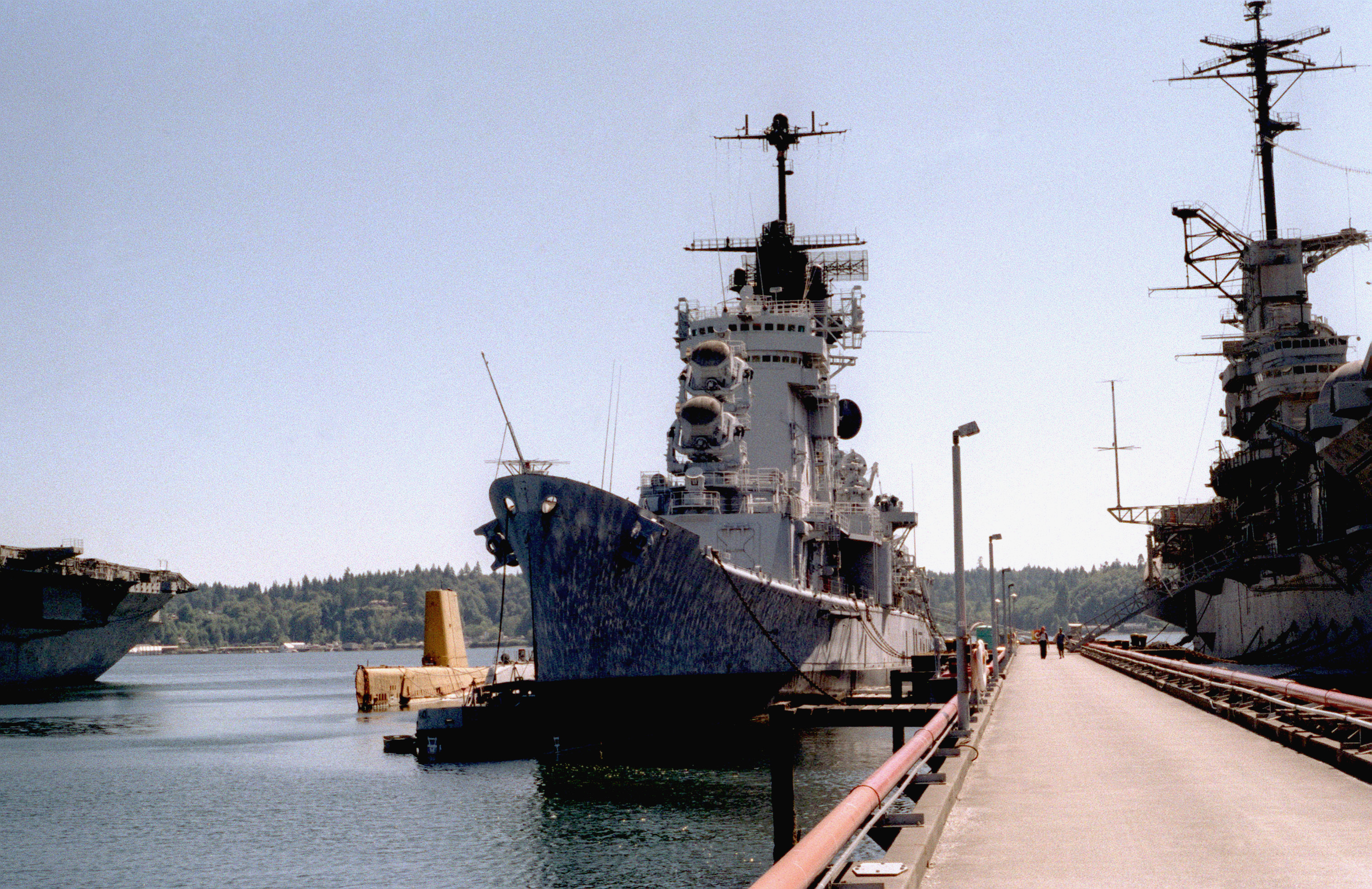
Chicago alongside USS Hornet at the Naval Inactive Ship Maintenance Facility at Puget Sound in 1990

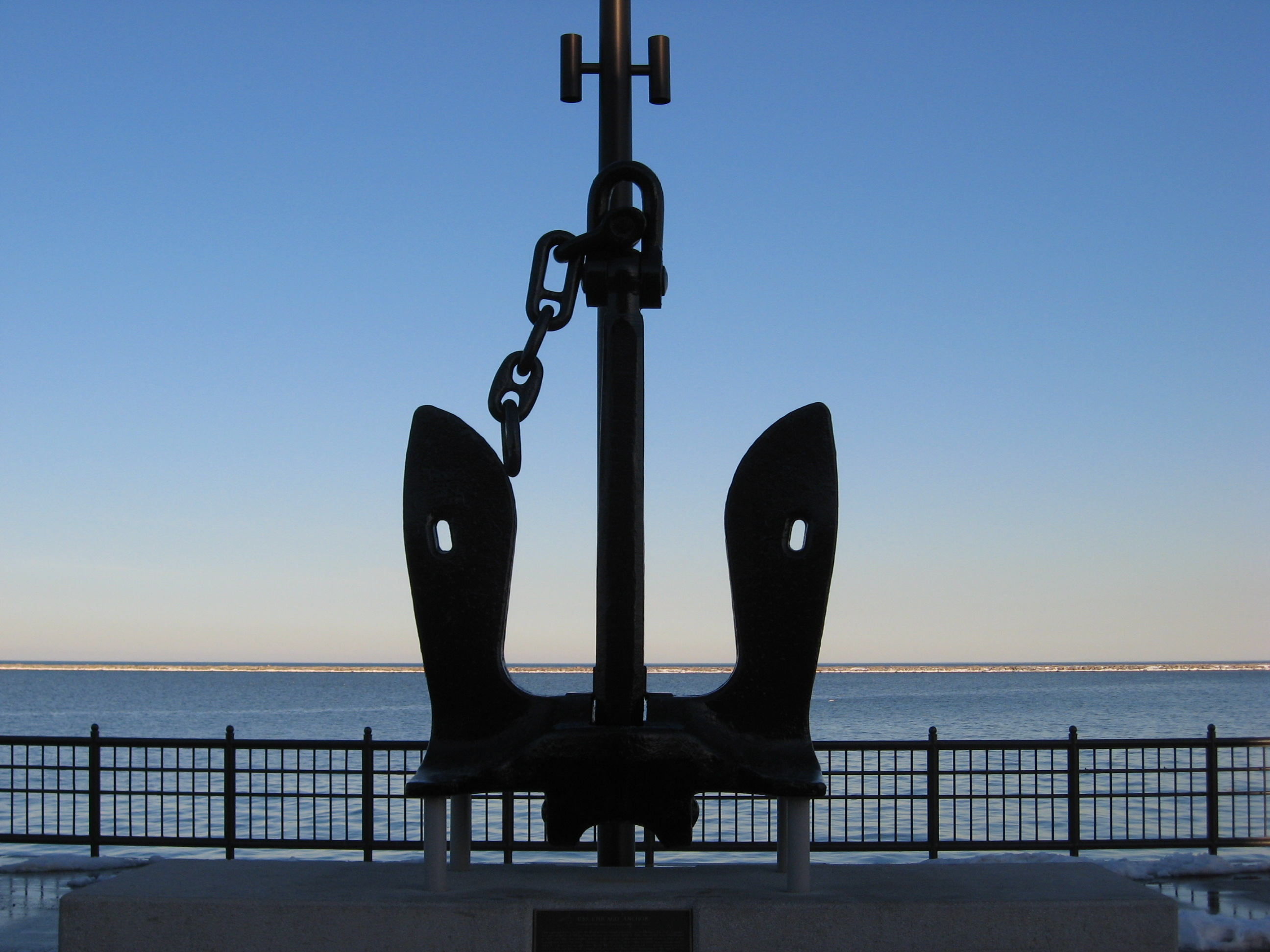
USS Chicago Anchor on display at Navy Pier

After a monthlong pre-deployment period, the ship departed on 30 May for her final cruise to the Western Pacific. Chicago escorted the aircraft carrier Kitty Hawk and her battle group to Pearl Harbor, conducting exercises with the cruiser Jouett, frigate Lang, and auxiliary vessel Wabash along the way, before steaming on to Subic Bay on 13 June. Fleet exercises off Okinawa, and a port visit to Pusan, South Korea, at the end of July, were followed by refugee surveillance in the South China Sea. There, along with other 7th Fleet ships, she helped rescue Vietnamese refugees fleeing the mainland, picking up five herself.

Escort duties for Kitty Hawk continued through September when, on 6 October, she sailed for Australia. On 15 October, after memorial services for two cruisers lost in the Solomon Islands battles during World War II, Canberra and the earlier Chicago, the cruiser began two weeks of exercises in the Coral Sea. After the exercise, involving seven U.S. ships and twenty Australian and New Zealand vessels, the ship visited Sydney, Australia, for a week-long port visit, then departed for the west coast via Subic Bay and Pearl Harbor, and arrived at San Diego on 17 December.

While fiscal year 1980 funding for a thorough overhaul and modernization was approved by Congress, an inspection classified the cruiser as unfit for further economical naval service, and on 1 March 1980, Chicago was decommissioned at San Diego. Towed to the Inactive Ship Facility at Bremerton, Washington, the ship was held in reserve until 8 February 1989. Stripped of equipment by 11 August, the hulk was sold for scrap to Southwest Recycling, Inc., Terminal Island, California, on 9 December 1991. The anchor was saved and placed on display at Chicago's Navy Pier on 11 November 1995.

== Awards ==
- She was awarded the Meritorious Unit Commendation for her efforts in developing the PIRAZ concept on her Western Pacific cruises in 1966 and 1967–68.
- In 1972, the cruiser was awarded the Navy Unit Commendation for Vietnam Service, the Arleigh Burke Fleet Trophy, and her seventh consecutive "E" for excellence in missilery.

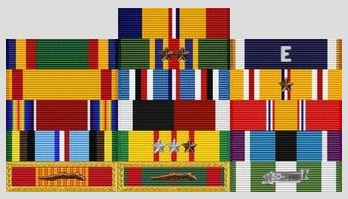
USS Chicago (CA-136/CG-11) citations

Precedence of awards is from top to bottom, left to right

- Top Row - Combat Action Ribbon
- Second Row - Navy Unit Commendation - Navy Meritorious Unit Commendation (3) - Navy Battle "E" Ribbon
- Third Row - China Service Medal - American Campaign Medal - Asiatic-Pacific Campaign Medal
- Fourth Row - WWII Victory Medal - Navy Occupation Medal w/Asia Clasp - National Defense Service Medal
- Fifth Row - Armed Forces Expeditionary Medal - Vietnam Campaign Medal (11) - Humanitarian Service Medal
- Sixth Row - Republic of Vietnam Gallantry Cross Unit Citation - Republic of Vietnam Civil Action 1C Unit Citation - Republic of Vietnam Service Medal

== Bibliography ==
- Wright, Christopher C. (1977). "The Tall Ladies...Columbus, Albany & Chicago". Warship International. XIV (2): 104–134. ISSN 0043-0374.
