= USS Mahan (DDG-42) =

United States Navy guided missile destroyer

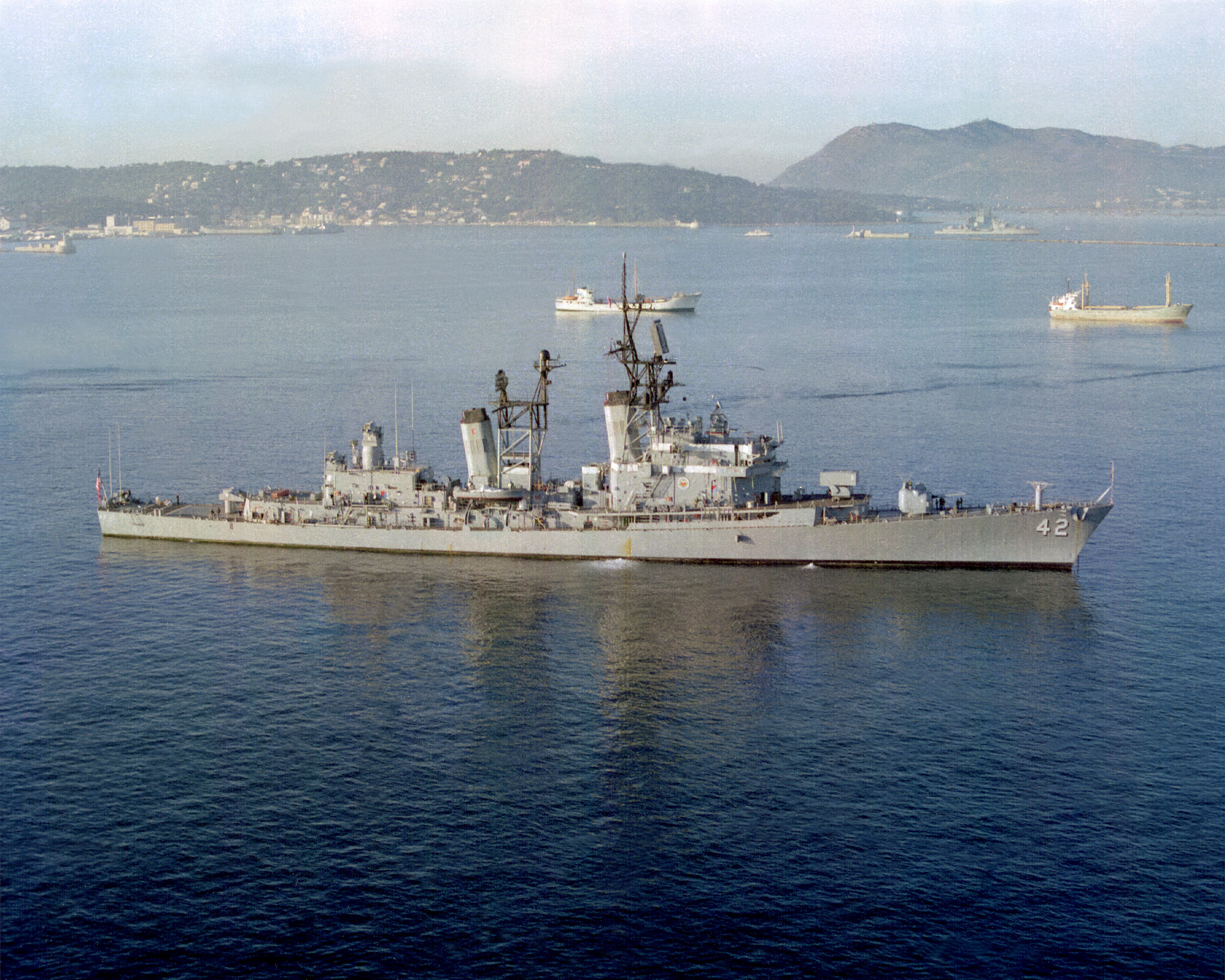
- USS Mahan (DDG-42)

History

United States
- Name: Mahan
- Namesake: Alfred Thayer Mahan
- Ordered: 18 November 1955
- Builder: San Francisco Naval Shipyard
- Laid down: 31 July 1957
- Launched: 7 October 1959
- Acquired: 31 December 1960
- Commissioned: 25 December 1960
- Decommissioned: 15 June 1993
- Stricken: 15 June 1993
- Identification: DDG-42
- Fate: Disposed of by scrapping; 18 May 2004
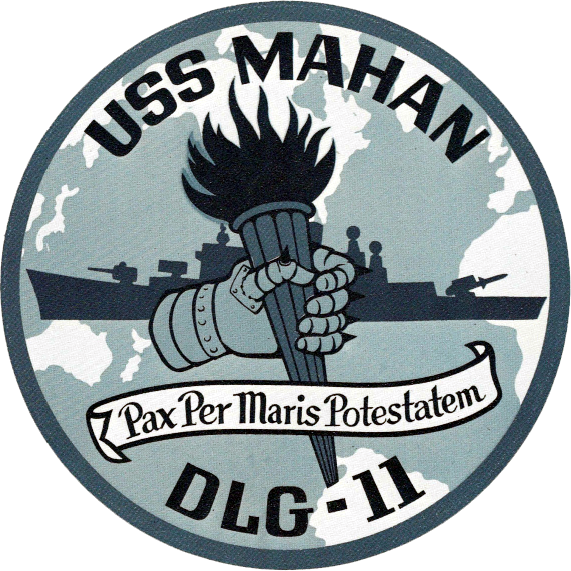
- Badge

General characteristics
- Class & type: Farragut-class guided missile destroyer
- Displacement: 5,800 tons
- Length: 512.5 ft (156.2 m)
- Beam: 52 ft (16 m)
- Draft: 25 ft (7.6 m)
- Propulsion: 4 x 1200psi boilers; 2 geared turbines
- Speed: 36.5 knots (67.6 km/h; 42.0 mph)
- Range: 4,500 nautical miles (8,300 km; 5,200 mi) at 20 knots (37 km/h; 23 mph)
- Complement: 377 (21 officers + 356 enlisted)
- Sensors & processing systems: AN/SPS-48D air-search radar; AN/SPS-49 air-search radar; AN/SPG-55B fire control radar; AN/SPG-53F gun fire control radar
- Electronic warfare & decoys: AN/SLQ-32
- Armament: 1 x Mk 42 5-inch/54 (127 mm/54) caliber gun; Mark 46 torpedoes from two Mk-32 triple mounts; 1 x Mk 16 ASROC missile launcher; 1 x Mk 10 Mod.0 missile launcher for Standard (ER) Missiles; 2 x Mk 141 Harpoon missile launchers

USS Mahan (DLG-11/DDG-42), was a Farragut-class guided missile destroyer in the United States Navy. She was named for Rear Admiral Alfred Thayer Mahan USN (1840–1914). The ship was laid down as DLG-11 by the San Francisco Naval Shipyard on 31 July 1957 and launched on 7 October 1959. Mahan was sponsored by Mrs. H. P. Smith, wife of Vice Adm. Harold Page Smith, and commissioned on 25 December 1960. Mahan was reclassified as a guided missile destroyer on 30 June 1975 and designated DDG-42. USS Mahan was decommissioned on 15 June 1993 and stricken from the Naval Vessel Register on the same day.

== History ==
During the first year and a half of her commissioned service, Mahan's primary assignment was the testing and evaluation of her weapons systems, RUR-5 ASROC and RIM-2 Terriers. A unit of the Pacific Fleet's Cruiser Destroyer Force, she operated out of San Diego, participating in local and fleet exercises off the west coast and in Hawaiian waters. Leaving San Diego on 6 June 1962, she commenced her first western Pacific deployment. For the next 6 months she cruised with other units of the 7th Fleet, taking part in antisubmarine, antiaircraft, and amphibious exercises as well as making good-will calls on ports in the Far East. Included in these latter visits was a stop at Saigon from 24 to 28 October for the Republic of Vietnam's Independence anniversary celebrations.

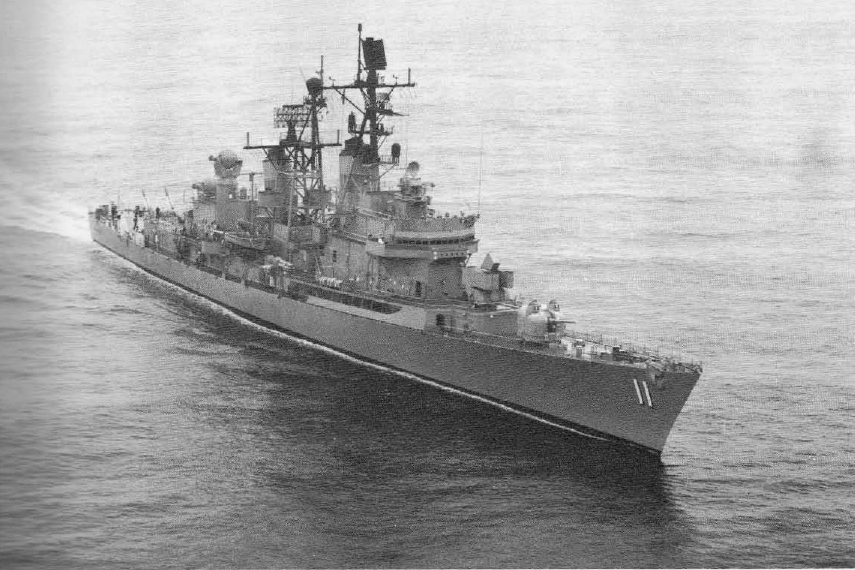
Mahan in 1965–66.

1963 brought Mahan's entrance into the standard schedule of the Pacific Fleet, beginning with a shipyard overhaul at Long Beach Naval Shipyard. Following her yard period, she conducted training exercises off the west coast. She then departed San Diego on 6 August 1963 for deployment in the western Pacific. In addition to assignments in Japanese and Philippine waters, she spent (on this tour) a total of four weeks cruising off South Vietnam before returning to San Diego on 10 March 1964.

Remaining on the west coast until late 1965, she underwent a 5½ month overhaul, from 1 May 1965 to 20 October 1965, followed by test and training exercises and a demonstration of her antisubmarine warfare capabilities before members of the United States-Canadian Military Cooperation Committee on 9 December 1965. During the summer of 1965, she embarked midshipmen from the Naval Academy and various NROTC units for summer training. Departing San Diego on 19 October, she sailed to Pearl Harbor for antisubmarine training operations and then continued on to the western Pacific, arriving at Subic Bay on 22 November 1965. Mahan operated with the 7th Fleet, spending alternate monthly periods on patrol off Vietnam, until returning to San Diego in April 1966.

Upon arrival at San Diego on 28 April, Mahan continued her previous west coast activities, local and fleet training operations, missile firing exercises at the Pacific Missile Range, and, as during the summer of 1965, the training of midshipmen during June and July. August brought the installation of a helicopter flight deck.

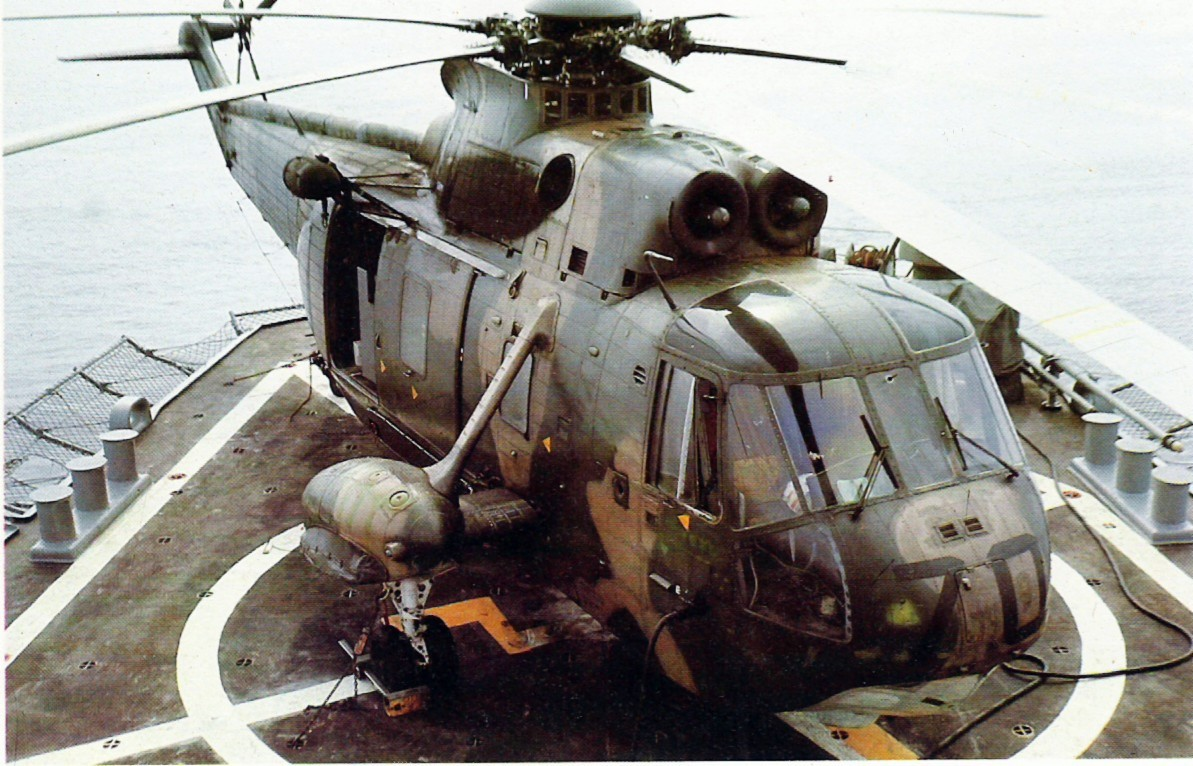
A Sea King of HS-2 on the fantail of Mahan in the Gulf of Tonkin, 1967.

The period 1 December 1966 through 4 June 1967 again saw Mahan in the western Pacific where, as before, she operated off Vietnam, patrolling the Gulf of Tonkin (PIRAZ) station and providing gunfire support. Arriving back at San Diego on 17 June, Mahan sailed on 31 July to represent the Navy at Seattle's annual Sea Fair. Following further coastal operations, she entered Long Beach Naval Shipyard on 1 November for overhaul. This was completed late in April 1968 and Mahan remained off the west coast until departing for the western Pacific in August. She remained as a part of the 7th Fleet into 1969.

In 1973, after 13 years of almost continuous operations in Southeast Asia, she returned to the U.S. for a much needed overhaul at Bath Iron Works, Maine. On 1 April 1975, DLG-11 was recommissioned at Bath. She then joined Destroyer Squadron 4, homeported at Charleston, South Carolina. On 1 July 1975, the ship was redesigned from DLG-11 to DDG-42 as part of a Navy-wide reclassification program.

Mahan served as the test platform for the development of the CG/SM-2 (ER) missile program project; a new missile, designed to greatly increase the operational capability of presently installed RIM-2 Terrier systems.

Following a regular overhaul in Philadelphia from April 1980 to May 1981, Mahan was selected to install and test the Terrier New Threat Upgrade (NTU) Combat System with the improved RIM-67 Standard Missile Two Block II (Extended Range). Testing lasted from October 1981 to March 1985.

This New Threat Upgrade system made Mahan the most capable anti-air warfare ship in the U.S. Navy. The upgrade was considered for the other ships in the class, but was cancelled since modernization would not have been cost-effective given the limited service lives remaining.

From April to November 1983, Mahan was deployed to the Mediterranean Sea, serving most of the deployment as a member of the Multinational Peacekeeping Force off Beirut, Lebanon.

Mahan achieved another first in July 1985, as she successfully conducted the first Remote Track Launch on Search missile firing.

Mahan celebrated her 25th birthday on 28 August 1985 and departed again to the Mediterranean. During the deployment, Mahan participated in Exercise "Ocean Safari 85": a joint U.S.-French missile exercise. She also represented Commander Sixth Fleet, serving as official starter for the inaugural Monaco-New YorkYacht race, (hosting Monaco's Crown Prince and the Deputy Under-Secretary of the Navy). Mahan also served as East Mediterranean Ready Ship off of Israel and Lebanon and was involved in the Gulf of Sidra Freedom of Navigation operations off the coast of Libya.

After returning from deployment in April 1986, Mahan began a 10-month regular overhaul lasting from September 1986 until August 1987.

In January 1988, Mahan successfully completed refresher training in Guantánamo Bay, Cuba. In the spring of 1988, Mahan participated in a joint missile exercise with U.S. and ships of the German Navy.

Mahan deployed with Standing Naval Forces Atlantic, from 17 June to 16 December 1989. While acting as the U.S. representative of this NATO force, Mahan visited eight different countries and worked with fourteen ships from nine NATO nations. The crowning achievement of the cruise occurred in November 1989, when Mahan added another first to her long list of accomplishments by firing the first SM-2 Block II (ER) in Northern Europe.

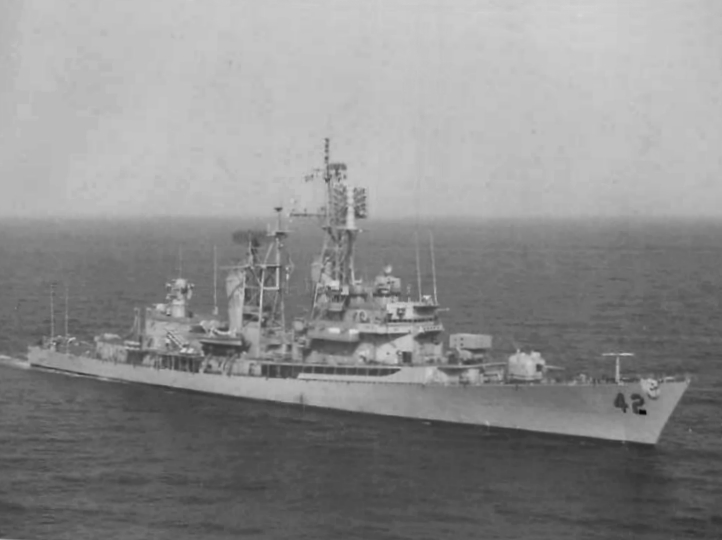
Mahan in the Persian Gulf, 1991.

Mahan's last major deployment was in support of Operation Desert Storm from 26 September 1991 through 2 April 1992. During the deployment Mahan transited through the mouth of the Suez Canal in the early morning of 13 October. After five months in the heat of the Persian Gulf, Mahan headed north, where she even crossed the Arctic Circle. The ship took part in the largest NATO exercise in over a decade, "Teamwork 92" pitted the seamanship and war-fighting skills against a multi-faceted threat.

After 33 years of service she was retired from the active roll on 15 June 1993, Naval Station Charleston, South Carolina.

Decommissioned and stricken from the Naval Vessel Register on 15 June 1993, Mahan was sold for scrap to Sigma Enterprises on 31 August 1995. Mahan was repossessed from the scrap yard and resold on 10 February 1999 to International Shipbreakers of Brownsville, Texas, for $97,275. Mahan was repossessed for a second time on 10 July 2000 after the scrap yard failed to take delivery of the ship in a timely manner. A contract to dismantle Mahan was issued in January 2003 to Bethlehem Steel-Sparrows Point of Baltimore, Maryland, to dismantle Mahan. Mahan was repossessed for a third time after Bethlehem Steel went out of business and a new contract was issued to dismantle Mahan on 30 September 2003 to Metro Machine of Philadelphia, Pennsylvania, for $3,000,000. Mahan ceased to exist on 18 May 2004, with her steel being sold to a metal company to be melted down.
