= PIRAZ =

Positive Identification Radar Advisory Zone

Position in the Tonkin Gulf

PIRAZ is a United States Navy acronym for Positive Identification Radar Advisory Zone. The zone is defined by the air search radar coverage of a ship patrolling a designated PIRAZ station. The concept was similar to radar picket stations established in World War II. The PIRAZ ship requires a Naval Tactical Data System radio-linked computer installation to effectively identify and track all aircraft anticipated to enter the airspace of the zone during combat.

== History ==
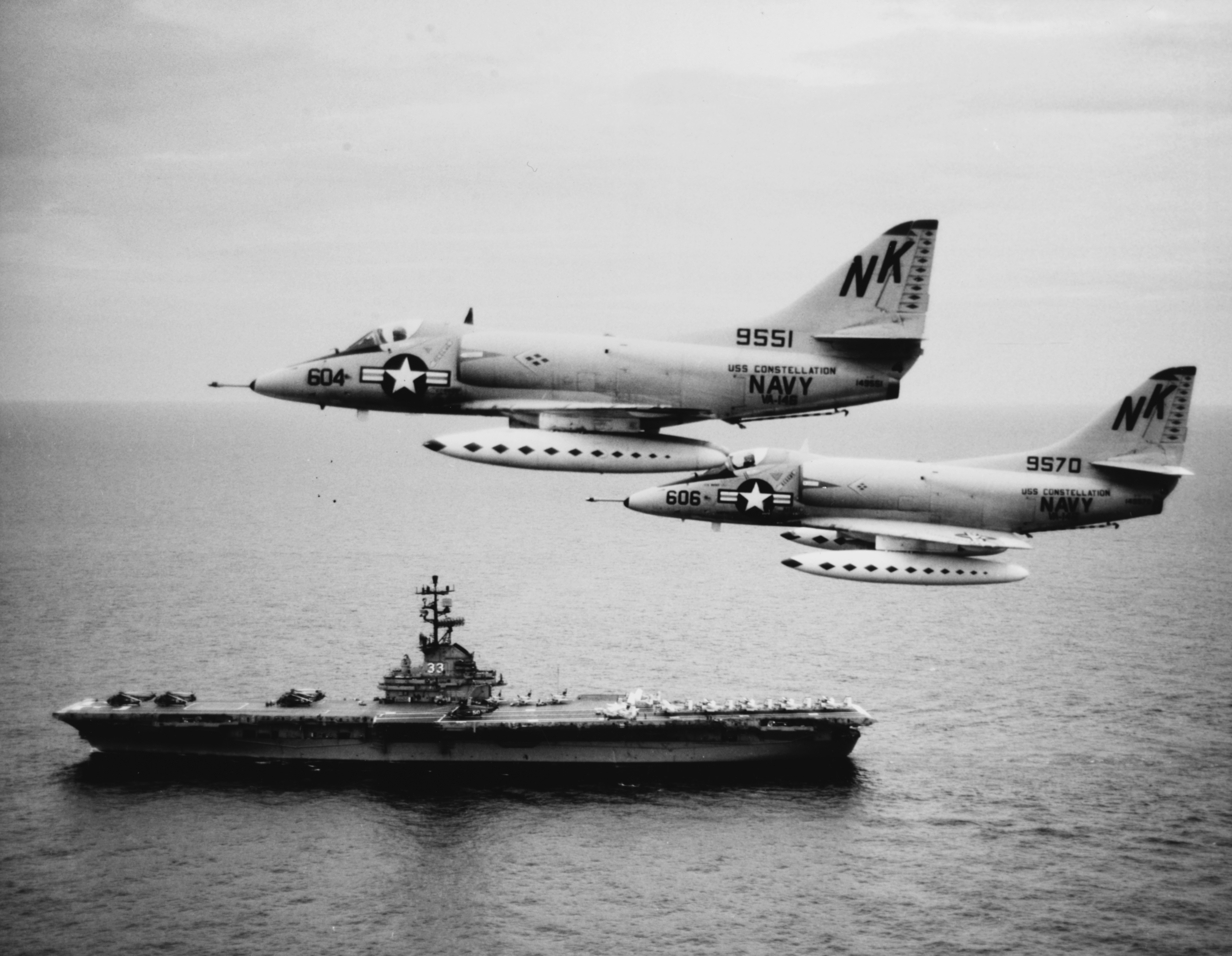
PIRAZ originated to protect Yankee station aircraft carriers during the Vietnam war.

The concept originated in the summer of 1966 as Yankee Station was established for United States Task Force 77 aircraft carriers launching strikes against North Vietnam. A fixed patrol station within range of land-based aircraft made the stationed aircraft carriers vulnerable to attack. A PIRAZ station was established in the westernmost portion of the Gulf of Tonkin where air search radar coverage might extend over North Vietnam and the air-strike routes from Yankee station. This PIRAZ station radio call sign was "Red Crown." The first PIRAZ ships were USS Chicago, King, Mahan, and Long Beach. Belknap class frigates began rotating into PIRAZ station assignments in 1967; and USS Wainwright, assisted in the Son Tay Raid on 21 November 1970.

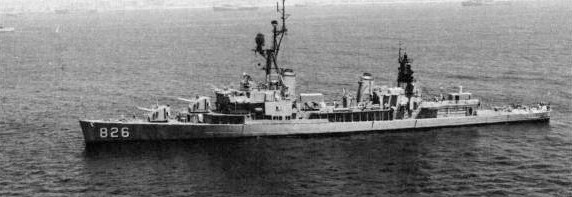
USS Agerholm was typical of the ships providing torpedo boat destroyer "shotgun" escort for the Gulf of Tonkin PIRAZ station.

PIRAZ ships carried long-range RIM-2 Terrier or RIM-8 Talos surface-to-air missiles to defend their stations. Chicago fired RIM-8H Talos-ARM anti-radar homing missiles against North Vietnamese shore-based radar stations. Each PIRAZ ship was accompanied on station by a "shotgun" torpedo boat destroyer with quick-firing guns to defend the PIRAZ ships from torpedo boat attack. PIRAZ ships provided protective radar surveillance of the remotely piloted vehicles performing aerial photo reconnaissance of North Vietnam.

As the Gulf of Tonkin PIRAZ station routine developed, a PIRAZ ship would typically remain on station for approximately 30 days before being relieved by another ship. During the 30-day relief period, the ship would usually travel to a liberty port in Hong Kong or Japan and then to the U.S. Naval Base Subic Bay in the Philippines for minor repairs and missile firing exercises before returning to the PIRAZ station. The ship would typically return to a United States home port for approximately six months after three PIRAZ station assignments with two intervening relief periods.

== Combat Information Center ==
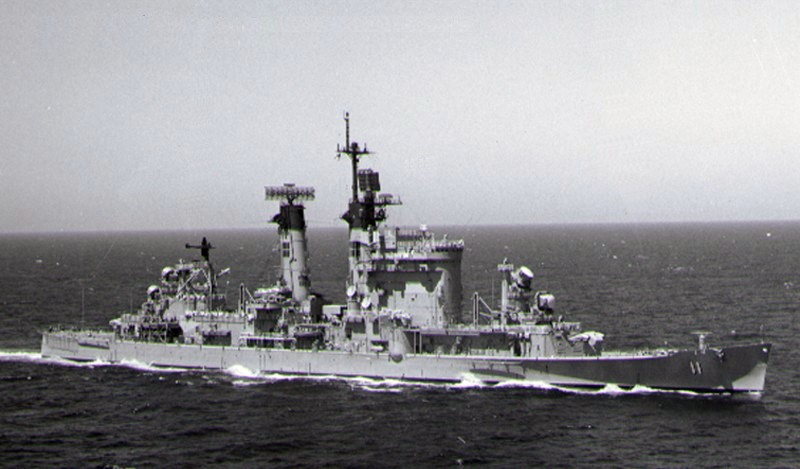
On PIRAZ duty for the May 1972, aerial mining of Hai Phong harbor, USS Chicago's air controllers guided Navy and Air Force fighter pilots to intercepts downing 12 MiG fighters while a RIM-8 Talos missile destroyed a 13th MiG fighter.

The PIRAZ ship Combat Information Center (or CIC) was continuously staffed by 35 to 40 officers and sailors watching radar displays, updating position and identification information for NTDS computers, and maintaining radio communication with aircraft and other ships. Some CIC personnel acted as air traffic controllers providing either advisory control or close control. Close (or positive) control occurred when the controller provided specific altitudes, courses, and speeds to the pilot. Personnel providing positive control are called Air Intercept Controllers (AIC). Advisory control simply offered advice concerning proximity to operating area boundaries, nearby air traffic, or known Surface-to-air missile (SAM) or Anti-Aircraft Artillery (AAA) sites.

Chicago's CIC included a secret signals intelligence (Sigint) team using modern electronics to evaluate very weak electromagnetic radiations from North Vietnamese aircraft or SAM sites. The team could transfer real time Sigint information to PIRAZ air controllers. Chicago AICs monitored up to 50 North Vietnamese MiGs simultaneously. On the Tonkin Gulf PIRAZ station, successful AICs concentrated on providing threat information, collecting and sorting tactical information as it developed, and informing the Combat Air Patrols (or CAP) about the threat location and activities while letting aircrews deal with bearing drift and controlling their headings.

== Combat Air Patrol ==
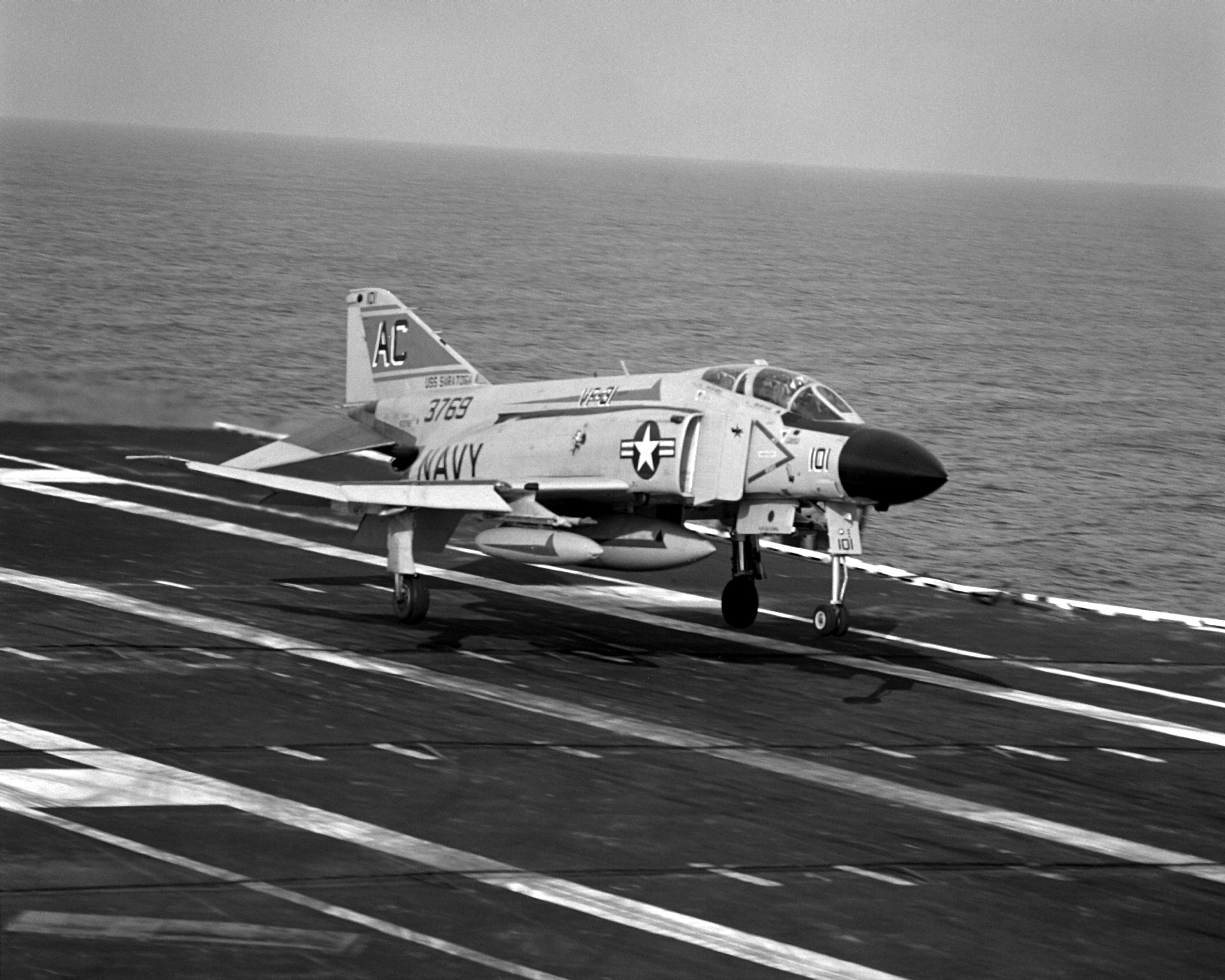
A US Navy F-4J Phantom fighter typical of PIRAZ controlled CAP.

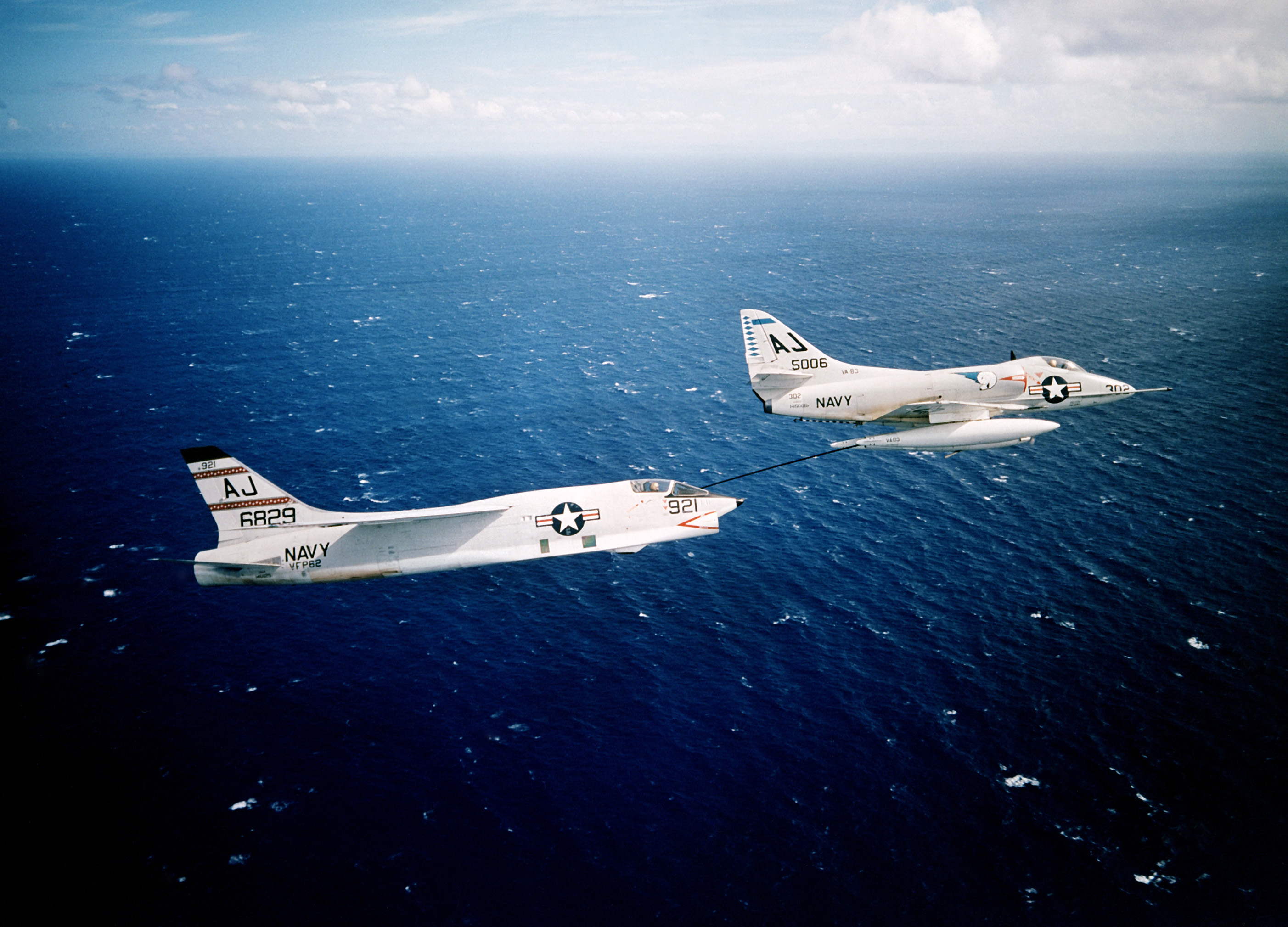
VA-83 A-4 Skyhawk refueling a VFP-62 RF-8 Crusader.

Ships on PIRAZ station mounted the air search radar closest to enemy airfields and were best positioned to offer radar information to Navy, Air Force, and Marine Corps fighters. Combat Air Patrols (CAP) were typically under advisory control, and would come under positive control when being vectored to hostile aircraft detected by the PIRAZ ship. PIRAZ shipboard air controllers would also provide positive control for aircraft requiring in-flight refueling. Gulf of Tonkin barrier CAP (BARCAP) routinely refueled; and CAP involved in an engagement usually returned with a low fuel state requiring emergency refueling. Three Chicago AICs assisted 52 declared emergency refueling situations for Air Force aircraft in a single day. Preferred procedure turns the tanker aircraft in front of the low fuel state aircraft to minimize search and maneuvering fuel consumption while allowing the fighter to continue away from hostile territory. In some cases, damaged aircraft with leaking fuel tanks can be saved by continuous refueling from rendezvous to landing.

Chief Operations Specialist Larry Nowell, controlled more than 1500 intercepts aboard Mahan and Chicago, and became one of the best known PIRAZ air controllers of the Vietnam War. Chief Nowell provided air control information for more than 100 live engagements with enemy aircraft including 25 percent of intercepts leading to destruction of North Vietnamese fighters in 1972. In August 1972, Chief Nowell became the second enlisted man in Navy history to be awarded the Distinguished Service Medal.

== Search and Rescue ==
One PIRAZ shipboard air controller was designated as "flight follower" for each Navy or Air Force formation of strike aircraft to track the strike's progress and offer information required to complete the mission. Flight followers worked with as many as 24 aircraft on a single frequency. PIRAZ ships had the most recent position information for downed aircraft, and were often the closest surface force to a crash site. All PIRAZ ships were equipped with landing platforms for SH-3 Sea King "Big Mother" or SH-2 Seasprite "Clementine" armored helicopters for Search and Rescue (SAR) work. The weapons arrangement of Belknap class frigates was more favorable for helicopter operation, because helicopters on the fantail landing platform would be damaged during missile firing from the stern launcher of Leahy and Coontz class frigates. PIRAZ shipboard air controllers could provide positive control for SAR aircraft; and PIRAZ ships could provide on-deck refueling service for Navy and Air Force helicopters.
