= Jouett =

Jouett is a surname. Notable people with the name include:

- Jack Jouett (1754–1822) American politician
- James Edward Jouett (1826–1902), United States Navy officer
- Matthew Harris Jouett (1788–1827), American painter

== See also ==
- USS Jouett, multiple ships named for the Navy officer
