= List of ship commissionings in 1966 =

The list of ship commissionings in 1966 includes a chronological list of all ships commissioned in 1966.

	Operator	Ship	Flag	Class and type	Pennant	Other notes
8 January	United States Navy	Wainwright		Belknap-class cruiser	CG-28	
25 February	Finnlines	Finndana	Finland	ferry		Previously Hansa Express for the same company
28 March	Finnlines	Finnhansa	Finland	ferry		Delivery delayed by two onboard fires; largest ferry on the Baltic Sea when delivered
27 April	Siljarederiet	Fennia	Finland	ferry		
2 May	Swedish Lloyd	Saga	Sweden	ferry		
8 May	United States Navy	Fox		Belknap-class cruiser	CG-33	
21 June	Royal Navy	Fife		County-class destroyer	D20	
22 June	Finnlines	Finnpartner	Finland	ferry		
9 July	United States Navy	William H. Standley		Belknap-class cruiser	CG-32	
6 August	United States Navy	Tripoli		Iwo Jima-class amphibious assault ship	LPH-10	
27 August	United States Navy	Arlington		Saipan-class aircraft carrier modified into communications relay ship	AGMR-2	Former USS Saipan
25 February	TT-Line	Finndana	Finland	ferry		Chartered from Finnlines
11 October	Royal Navy	Glamorgan		County-class destroyer	D19	
27 October	Rederi AB Svea	Svea	Sweden	ferry		
15 November	Chilean Navy	Virgilio Uribe		Buckley-class destroyer escort	APD-29	Former USS Daniel T. Griffin
27 August	United States Navy	Jouett		Belknap-class cruiser	CG-29	
