= USS Jouett =

Three ships in the United States Navy have been named USS Jouett for James Edward Jouett.

- USS Jouett (DD-41) was a Paulding-class destroyer launched in 1912, served in World War I, served in the United States Coast Guard from 1924 to 1930 and sold in 1934
- USS Jouett (DD-396) was a Somers-class destroyer launched in 1938, served in World War II and decommissioned in 1945
- USS Jouett (DLG-29) was a Belknap-class guided missile cruiser launched in 1964 and decommissioned in 1994
