= USS Josephus Daniels =

U.S. Navy guided missile cruiser

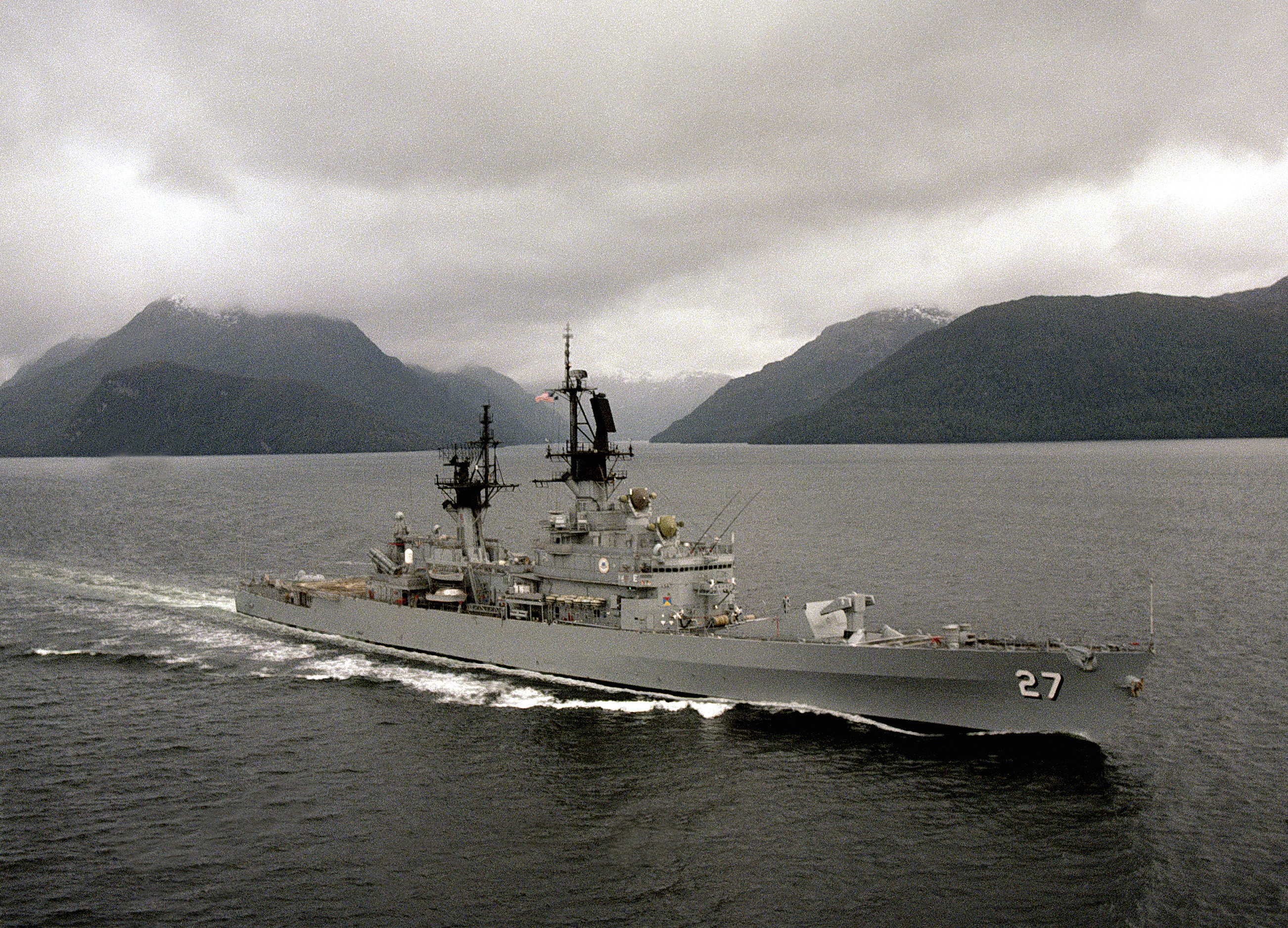
- USS Josephus Daniels (CG-27)

History

United States
- Name: Josephus Daniels
- Namesake: Josephus Daniels
- Ordered: 18 May 1961
- Builder: Bath Iron Works
- Laid down: 23 April 1962
- Launched: 2 December 1963
- Sponsored by: Mrs. Robert M. Woronoff and Mrs. Clyde R. Rich Jr., granddaughters of Josephus Daniels
- Acquired: 4 May 1965
- Commissioned: 8 May 1965
- Decommissioned: 21 January 1994
- Reclassified: CG-27 30 June 1975
- Stricken: 21 January 1994
- Home port: NS Norfolk, Virginia (former)
- Nickname(s): Joey D
- Fate: Sold for scrap to International Shipbreaking LTD, Brownsville, TX. Scrapping completed 8 NOV 1999
- Badge

General characteristics
- Class & type: Belknap-class cruiser
- Displacement: 7930 tons
- Length: 547 ft (167 m)
- Beam: 55 ft (17 m)
- Draft: 28.8 ft (8.8 m)
- Speed: 30 knots (35 mph; 56 km/h)
- Complement: 418 officers and men
- Sensors & processing systems: AN/SPS-48E air-search radar, AN/SPG-55B fire-control radar
- Armament: one 5 in (130 mm)/54 gun; two 3 in (76 mm) guns; one Terrier missile launcher; six 15.5-inch (394 mm) torpedo tubes; Harpoon missiles; Phalanx CIWS

USS Josephus Daniels (DLG/CG-27) was a Belknap-class destroyer leader / cruiser. She was named for Josephus Daniels, Secretary of the Navy during World War I. She was launched as DLG-27, a frigate, and reclassified as a cruiser on 30 June 1975.

The contract to construct Josephus Daniels was awarded on 18 May 1961. Her keel was laid down at Bath Iron Works on 23 April 1962. She was launched on 2 December 1963, sponsored by Mrs. Robert M. Woronoff and Mrs. Clyde R. Rich Jr., granddaughters of Josephus Daniels; delivered to the navy on 4 May 1965 and commissioned on 8 May 1965.

After more than 28 years of service, Josephus Daniels was decommissioned on 21 January 1994. She was struck from the register on 21 January 1994 and laid up at James River reserve fleet, Fort Eustis, Virginia to be scrapped. The 'Joey D' was later dismantled by International Shipbreaking Ltd. of Brownsville, TX, with scrapping completed on 8 November 1999.
