= USS Truxtun (CGN-35) =

US Navy nuclear-powered guided missile cruiser

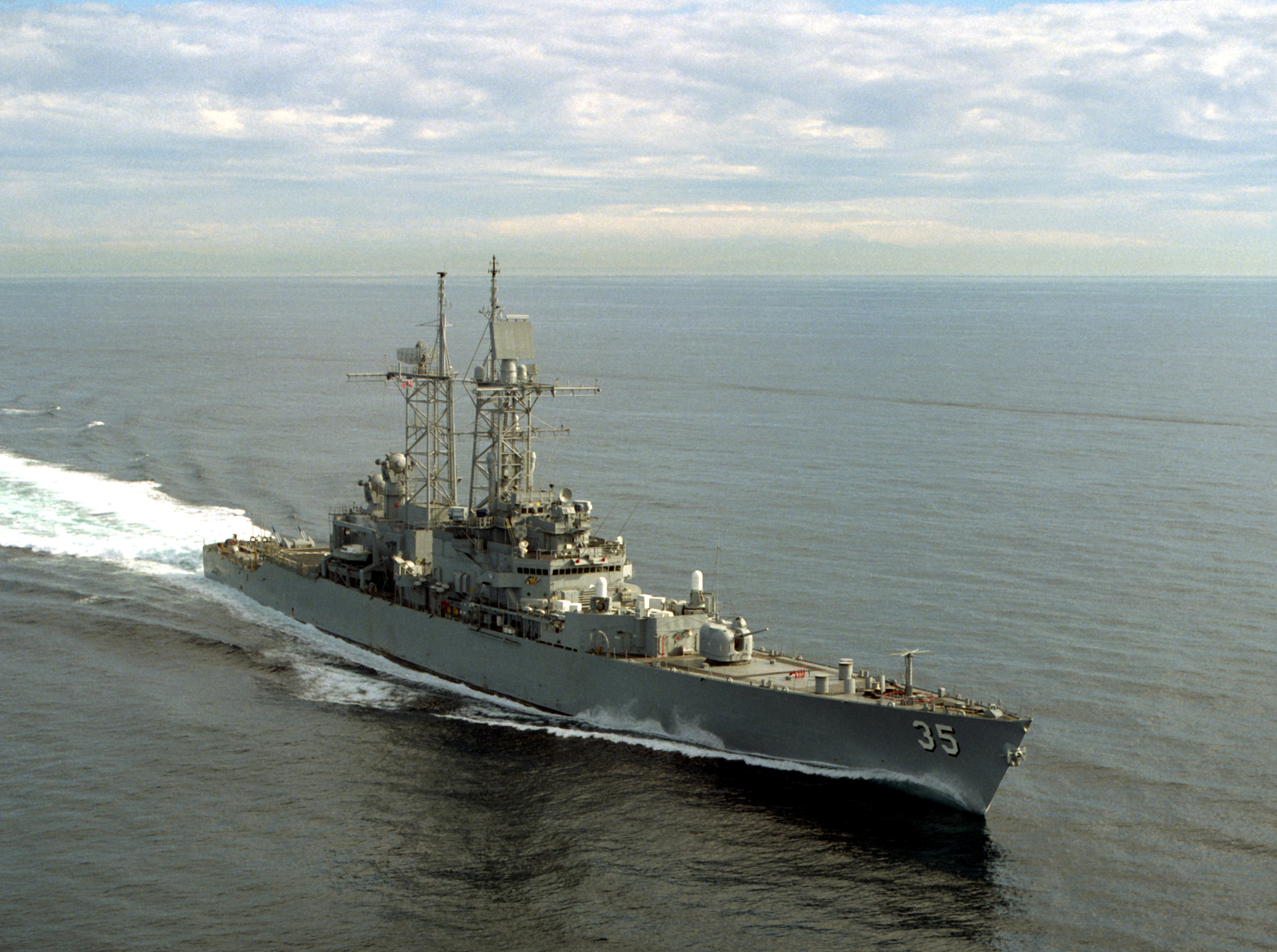
- USS Truxtun underway on 3 January 1989

History

United States
- Name: Truxtun
- Namesake: Thomas Truxtun
- Ordered: 23 June 1962
- Builder: New York Shipbuilding Corporation
- Laid down: 17 June 1963
- Launched: 19 December 1964
- Acquired: 26 May 1967
- Commissioned: 27 May 1967
- Decommissioned: 11 September 1995
- Stricken: 11 September 1995
- Identification: Callsign: NTYL; Hull number: CGN-35
- Motto: Ars navigandi – Fidelitas – Imperium; (Skillful navigation – Faithfulness – Power)
- Fate: Disposed of by Ship recycling, 16 April 1999 at Puget Sound Naval Shipyard
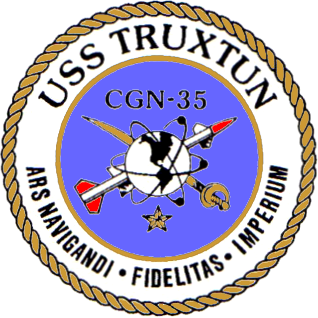
- Badge

General characteristics
- Class & type: Heavily modified nuclear variant of Belknap-class cruiser
- Displacement: 8,659 tons (full)
- Length: 564 ft (172 m)
- Beam: 58 ft (18 m)
- Draft: 30 ft 6 in (9.30 m)
- Propulsion: 2 GE pressurized-water D2G nuclear reactors; 2 shafts; 70,000 shp
- Speed: 31 knots (57 km/h; 36 mph)
- Range: Nuclear
- Complement: 492 officers and enlisted. Flag accommodation for 6 officers and 12 enlisted.
- Sensors & processing systems: AN/SPS-10 surface search RADAR; AN/SPS-40 air search RADAR; AN/SPS-48 3D air search RADAR; 2 AN/SPG-55 Terrier fire control RADAR; AN/SQS-26 SONAR
- Armament: 1 5 in (130 mm)/54 DP Mk 42 gun; 1 twin Mk 10 Mod 8 missile launcher for Standard ER and ASROC missiles; 3 20-missile horizontal drums in magazine; 2 × 2 12.75" Mk 32 fixed ASW torpedo tubes; 2 × 4 Harpoon anti-ship missile tubes; 2 × Phalanx CIWS
- Aircraft carried: facilities for 1 SH-2F LAMPS-II

The fifth USS Truxtun (DLGN-35/CGN-35) was a nuclear-powered cruiser in the U.S. Navy. She was launched as a destroyer leader (called a "frigate" at the time) and later reclassified as a cruiser. She was named after Commodore Thomas Truxtun (1755–1822). She was in service from May 1967 to September 1995.

== Class ==
The USS Truxtun was a nuclear-powered single-ended guided-missile cruiser (her missile armament was installed only aft, unlike "double-ended" cruisers with missile armament installed both forward and aft), based on a heavily modified version of the Belknap class. She was the only ship of her class. Truxtun was the third type of nuclear cruiser (all three were one-ship classes) to operate in the United States Navy, after Long Beach and Bainbridge, and was powered by the same D2G reactors as Bainbridge. Truxtun was originally designated as a nuclear-powered guided-missile destroyer leader (DLGN), but in the 1975 cruiser realignment, she was reclassified as a nuclear-powered guided-missile cruiser (CGN).

Virtually identical to the Belknap class in weapons systems, Truxtun was powered by two D2G reactors rather than her sister class's four 1,200 psi boilers. This resulted in Truxtun being larger overall: 17 feet (5.2 m) longer, 3 feet (0.91 m) greater across the beam, a 2-foot-deeper (0.61 m) draft, and a displacement of almost 1,200 more tons. The lessons learned on the Truxtun class were later adapted to the next nuclear classes, the California and Virginia classes of nuclear-powered cruisers.

Truxtun was commissioned with a 5-inch/54-caliber Mark 42 gun on the foredeck and a twin-rail Mk 10 Missile Launcher on the quarterdeck, for the RIM-2 Terrier missile. The Terrier system was later upgraded to utilizing the RIM-67A Standard missiles in place of the less reliable Terrier missile. The missile depot was located under the helicopter deck and could store 40 RIM-67 Standard and 20 RUR-5 ASROC missiles. Truxtun initially used two single 3-inch/50-caliber guns, however in 1979 these were replaced with two Harpoon missile launchers. The ASW suite of Truxtun originally included the un-manned DASH, but in 1971 the hangar was upgraded to LAMPS Mk. I and the SH-2 Seasprite helicopter. While Truxtun was not upgraded via the NTU program, two Phalanx CIWS systems were installed, and new electronics were installed during overhaul and nuclear refuelling in the mid-1980s.

== Construction ==
Truxtun was laid down by the New York Shipbuilding Corporation at Camden in New Jersey on 17 June 1963, launched on 19 December 1964 by Mrs. Kirby H. Tappan and Mrs. Scott Umsted, and commissioned on 27 May 1967. Originally planned to be a Belknap-class destroyer leader, she was extensively modified in her design to become the fourth nuclear-powered ship in the Navy, and she is considered to be her own class. At just over 8,500 tons full load, Truxtun is the smallest nuclear-powered surface vessel to have served in the US Navy.

== 1960s ==
Truxtun exited Camden on 3 June 1967 and headed for the West Coast. En route, she visited Yorktown, Virginia and Norfolk, Virginia; Guantánamo Bay, Cuba; Rio de Janeiro, Brazil; and Mar del Plata, Argentina. Truxtun rounded Cape Horn on 10 July and entered the Pacific Ocean. After port calls at Valparaíso, Chile, and Mazatlán, Mexico, Truxtun reached Long Beach, California, her home port, on 29 July. After conducting trials there in late summer and early fall, she commenced shakedown training in November. She interrupted shakedown twice: on 10 and 11 November for Operation "Bell Anchor" and again from 27 November to 3 December for Exercise "Blue Lotus."

The nuclear-powered warship completed her shakedown training and, on 2 January 1968, got underway for the Western Pacific. She made an overnight stop at Pearl Harbor on 7/8 January and arrived in Sasebo, Japan, on 19 January. Five days later, Truxtun and the aircraft carrier Enterprise departed Sasebo and headed for the Sea of Japan in response to North Korea's seizure of the American ship Pueblo. She operated in the Sea of Japan until 16 February when she headed south for her first line period off the coast of Vietnam. After an overnight stop at Subic Bay on 19–20 February, Truxtun set a course for "Yankee Station" in the Gulf of Tonkin. Truxtun spent the majority of the remainder of her deployment in the Far East operating off the coast of Vietnam. While in the combat zone, she conducted search and rescue (SAR) missions, stood guard against North Vietnamese air attacks as a positive identification radar zone (PIRAZ) picket ship, and served as plane-guard ship for carriers Enterprise, Bon Homme Richard, and Ticonderoga. Truxtun punctuated her line periods with calls at Singapore, Hong Kong, Danang, and Subic Bay. She departed Subic Bay on 6 July, steamed east toward the United States, and reentered Long Beach on 19 July.

For the next four months, the warship operated along the U.S. West Coast. She acted as plane guard for Ranger, Kitty Hawk, Enterprise and Yorktown while those carriers conducted landing qualifications for pilots. In mid-November, Truxtun became an antisubmarine warfare (ASW) school ship, and she hosted training student sailors in the techniques of hunting submarines. Early in December, Truxtun returned to Long Beach to prepare for overhaul. In January 1969, she shifted to Bremerton, Washington, where she entered the Puget Sound Naval Shipyard for refurbishing which lasted until April. The cruiser then resumed operations along the West Coast which continued until 23 September when she got underway for her second deployment with the 7th Fleet.

After a stop at Pearl Harbor, Truxtun arrived at Subic Bay on 20 October 1969. Again, she spent much of her deployment cruising along the coast of embattled Vietnam, taking time periodically to make port calls at Hong Kong, Singapore, and Subic Bay. However, in addition to acting as plane guard for carriers and standing duty as PIRAZ and a search and rescue ship, she also served as a peacetime aerial reconnaissance protective (PAPRO) picket in the Sea of Japan and participated in the Taiwan Strait patrol. Just before departing from the Far East, she conducted exercises in the vicinity of Okinawa and then made her final port visit at Sasebo, Japan, from 6 to 11 March 1970.

Truxtun was awarded the Navy Unit Commendation for superior performance during her deployment.

== 1970s ==
Truxtun returned to Long Beach on 23 March and launched into a round of inspections and training cruises. In June, the warship embarked 40 NROTC midshipmen for their summer training cruise. During the first part of the cruise, she fired missiles on the Pacific missile range and visited San Francisco and Seattle. On 13 July, she departed Seattle for Pearl Harbor to conduct the second part of the training cruise. On 29 July, Truxtun returned to Long Beach from Hawaii, disembarked the midshipmen, and resumed normal operations. For the remainder of the summer, she conducted exercises and underwent various inspections. From 16 to 25 October, she moored alongside Samuel Gompers for a tender availability. Following one more period of exercises at sea late in October, she entered the Long Beach Naval Shipyard in preparation for a three-month restricted availability which began on 2 November 1970.

Truxtun's yard work was completed in mid-January, she then conducted type training and ASW exercises before preparing to deploy to the western Pacific once more. She returned to Long Beach on 22 January 1971 and remained there until 2 February when she got underway for Pearl Harbor. After a two-day layover in Hawaii, she resumed her voyage to the Far East on 9 February and reached Subic Bay on 20 February. During that deployment, Truxtun returned to her familiar routine along the coast of Vietnam, standing PIRAZ picket duty and conducting exercises and tests. She visited Yokosuka, Japan, several times and made single stops at Hong Kong and Sattahip, Thailand. In late April, she also patrolled the Taiwan Strait for two days.

On 6 July, she completed her final line period of the deployment and left the Gulf of Tonkin. After a visit to Subic Bay, she set a course, on 10 July, for Fremantle, Australia, where she spent a week. Following port calls at Pago Pago, Samoa, and Pearl Harbor, she moored at Long Beach on 17 August and began post-deployment stand-down. Through the end of September, Truxtun received visitors on board and conducted drills to improve and to test her missile and gunnery marksmanship. During the first week in October, a Board of Inspection and Survey inspected Truxtun; and, on 8 October, she began a restricted availability during which she was modified to utilize the Light Airborne Multi-purpose System (LAMPS). From 18 November to 9 December, the ship conducted post-availability dock trials and type training as well as testing the newly installed LAMPS system. On 14 December 1971, a team from Naval Air Systems Command inspected and certified Truxtun's LAMPS installation.

During the first six months of 1972, Truxtun operated out of her home port in North American coastal waters. She conducted exercises, entertained visitors, and underwent several inspections. Following another restricted availability in June, she spent July preparing for her fourth tour of duty with the U.S. Seventh Fleet.

On 13 July, she departed Long Beach with HMNZS Canterbury, bound for the western Pacific and for her most eventful series of line periods off Vietnam. She parted company from Canterbury on 18 July and put into Pearl Harbor the following day. On 23 July, Truxtun resumed her voyage to the Orient and moored at Subic Bay on 4 August. Four days later, she loaded ammunition and got underway for her first line period in the Gulf of Tonkin. Over the next five months, Truxtun stood both SAR and PIRAZ picket duty. During these assignments, she evaded at least three typhoons. Her busiest week came between 8 and 15 October, when she directed fighter intercepts resulting in six MiG kills, three of which occurred on 15 October alone. By the end of her deployment, Truxtun was credited with directing fighter intercepts which resulted in the destruction of eleven North Vietnamese MiGs and rescue of three downed American pilots, earning the ship her second Navy Unit Commendation.

In October, November, and January, Truxtun briefly joined the Taiwan Strait patrol. She also made port calls at Sasebo, Singapore, Hong Kong, and Yokosuka. On 21 January 1973, Reeves relieved her on the north SAR station, and Truxtun headed, via the Taiwan Strait, for Japan. She stopped at Yokosuka from 26 to 30 January before continuing on, via Pearl Harbor, to Long Beach, where she arrived on Lincoln's Birthday.

Post-deployment stand-down took up the ensuing month. On 19 March, she moored alongside Piedmont and commenced a tender availability which lasted until late April. Truxtun then resumed operations in and out of Long Beach. In May, she conducted type training off the California coast and naval gunfire support qualifications at San Clemente Island. On 7 June, the warship began embarking Naval Academy and NROTC midshipmen for their summer cruise. For the next two months, she trained the midshipmen, carrying them to ports along the west coast as well as to Hawaii.

She debarked the midshipmen on 27 July and began preparations for her fifth deployment to the Far East. On 17 August, Truxtun got underway from Long Beach, bound for the western Pacific. En route, she stopped at Pearl Harbor and reached Subic Bay on 5 September. She punctuated relatively uneventful tours of duty on PIRAZ station in the Gulf of Tonkin with port visits to Sattahip, Singapore, and Manila. Truxtun also conducted missile exercises and ASW drills. On 9 December, she stood out of Subic Bay, sifted through the San Bernardino Strait, and headed for home. On Christmas Eve 1973, Truxtun moored at Long Beach and began preparations for her first complex overhaul.

On 25 January 1974, Truxtun cleared Long Beach for Bremerton, Washington. Four days later, she entered the Puget Sound Naval Shipyard. There, the warship began a major 18-month overhaul during which her nuclear reactors were "refueled." On 30 June 1975, near the end of that repair period, Truxtun was reclassified a nuclear-powered guided-missile cruiser and was redesignated CGN-35. On 31 July, she completed the overhaul and all attendant tests and trials and sailed for San Diego. She arrived in her new home port on 4 August and resumed normal operations in the southern California area. That schedule occupied her for the following 12 months.

On 30 July 1976, the guided-missile cruiser headed out of San Diego, bound for the western Pacific. After two weeks of training in the Hawaiian Islands, she continued her voyage west on 16 August; and, after a somewhat circuitous cruise that took her to Wellington in New Zealand and Melbourne in Australia, Truxtun arrived in Subic Bay on 25 September. She conducted operations in the Philippines for about a month and then departed Subic Bay on 28 October, bound for the Indian Ocean and participation in Operation "Midlink 76." She arrived in Karachi, Pakistan, on 9 November for three days of briefings in preparation for the exercise. From 13 to 21 November, the warship joined in the multinational exercise in the waters off the coast of Pakistan. She returned to Karachi at the conclusion of "Midlink" on the 21st and remained there until the 24th at which time she headed back to Subic Bay. Local operations in the Philippines occupied the remainder of the year. From 4 to 13 January 1977, Truxtun made a round-trip voyage to Hong Kong and back. She completed READEX 1–77 between 15 and 21 January and then again headed for the Indian Ocean in company with Enterprise and the cruiser Long Beach. En route, she and her travelling companions conducted exercise "Merlion III" with units of the Singapore Armed Forces on 25 January. Truxtun participated in Operation "Houdini" in mid-February and visited Port Victoria in the Seychelle Islands. She returned to Subic Bay on 13 March and, four days later, got underway for the United States.

After an 11-day non-stop voyage, she reentered San Diego on 28 March. The guided-missile cruiser conducted a four-week restricted availability and then resumed operations along the California coast. For six months, the warship conducted routine independent ship's exercises, gunnery drills, and antisubmarine warfare training. She spent the month of November at the Puget Sound Naval Shipyard undergoing repairs to her nuclear power plant and returned to San Diego on 4 December. For the remaining three weeks of 1977, Truxtun operated out of her home port.

The first three months of 1978 were spent in operations off the west coast in preparation for Truxtun's forthcoming deployment to the western Pacific. The ship departed San Diego on 4 April and spent the next six months in operations with the 7th Fleet which took her as far west as the Arabian Sea and as far south as Perth, Australia. During this cruise she also visited Colombo, Sri Lanka, Singapore, Hong Kong, and Pusan, South Korea. Truxtun returned to San Diego on 27 October. Local operations out of San Diego, following post-deployment stand-down, concluded the year. 1979 'Truxtun' departed San Diego, a brief stop at Seal Beach to unload ammo, then on to Bremerton. This time in Puget Sound Naval Shipyards, the 3" guns amidships were removed and the Harpoon system installed. While being serviced in a floating drydock, extreme diligence was done keeping her screws covered and away from prying eyes.

== 1980s and 1990s ==
On 26 February 1980, Truxtun departed San Diego, CA for her eighth WESTPAC (western Pacific) deployment, this time as part of the USS Constellation Battle Group. In command was CAPTAIN E.M. Baldwin, USN. Truxtun participated in RIMPAC 1980, a large multi-national Naval exercise near the Hawaiian Islands in March 1980. After a brief stopover in Pearl Harbor, Truxtun continued westward, arriving at the US Naval Shipyard in Subic Bay, Philippine Islands for a brief maintenance period. Following this inport period, Truxtun continued into the Western Pacific and Indian Ocean, eventually serving for an extended period of time during the Iranian Hostage Crisis. Toward the end of this deployment, which was extended due to operational requirements, Truxtun also made port calls in Subic Bay, Philippines, Pattaya Beach, Thailand and Wellington, New Zealand. On 15 October 1980, the cruiser returned to its homeport of San Diego. Anti-nuclear protest boats greeted Truxtun at Wellington in 1976, 1980 and 1982.

On 20 October 1981, Truxtun got underway from San Diego, CA for her ninth WESTPAC deployment. Inport periods again included Pearl Harbor and Subic Bay en route to the Western Pacific, Indian Ocean and the South Pacific. Much of the time Truxtun spent on underway operations during this deployment was in the Indian Ocean. Port calls included Mombasa, Kenya, Perth, Western Australia, Diego Garcia (BIOT), Brisbane, Queensland Australia, Hobart, Tasmania Australia, Nuku'Alofa, Kingdom of Tonga, and Wellington, New Zealand. On 12 June 1982, Truxtun returned to her homeport of San Diego to begin preparations for her upcoming Complex Overhaul (COH) in Washington State.

From September 1982 to July 1984 Truxtun underwent her final complex overhaul at Puget Sound Naval Shipyard which included upgrading the combat system suite to its final configuration.

On 15 January 1986 Truxtun left on her tenth WESTPAC, this time serving as the Anti-Air Warfare Commander for Battle Group FOXTROT. In April, because of increased tension in Libya and the Gulf of Sidra, Truxtun was diverted to the Mediterranean along with Enterprise and the cruiser Arkansas. After almost two months of operations in the Mediterranean, the three nuclear-powered ships were directed home by way of Gibraltar, the Cape of Good Hope, Western Australia, the Philippines and Hawaii. By the end of the seven-month deployment the all nuclear group had steamed over 65,000 miles and operated in all four numbered U.S. Fleets.

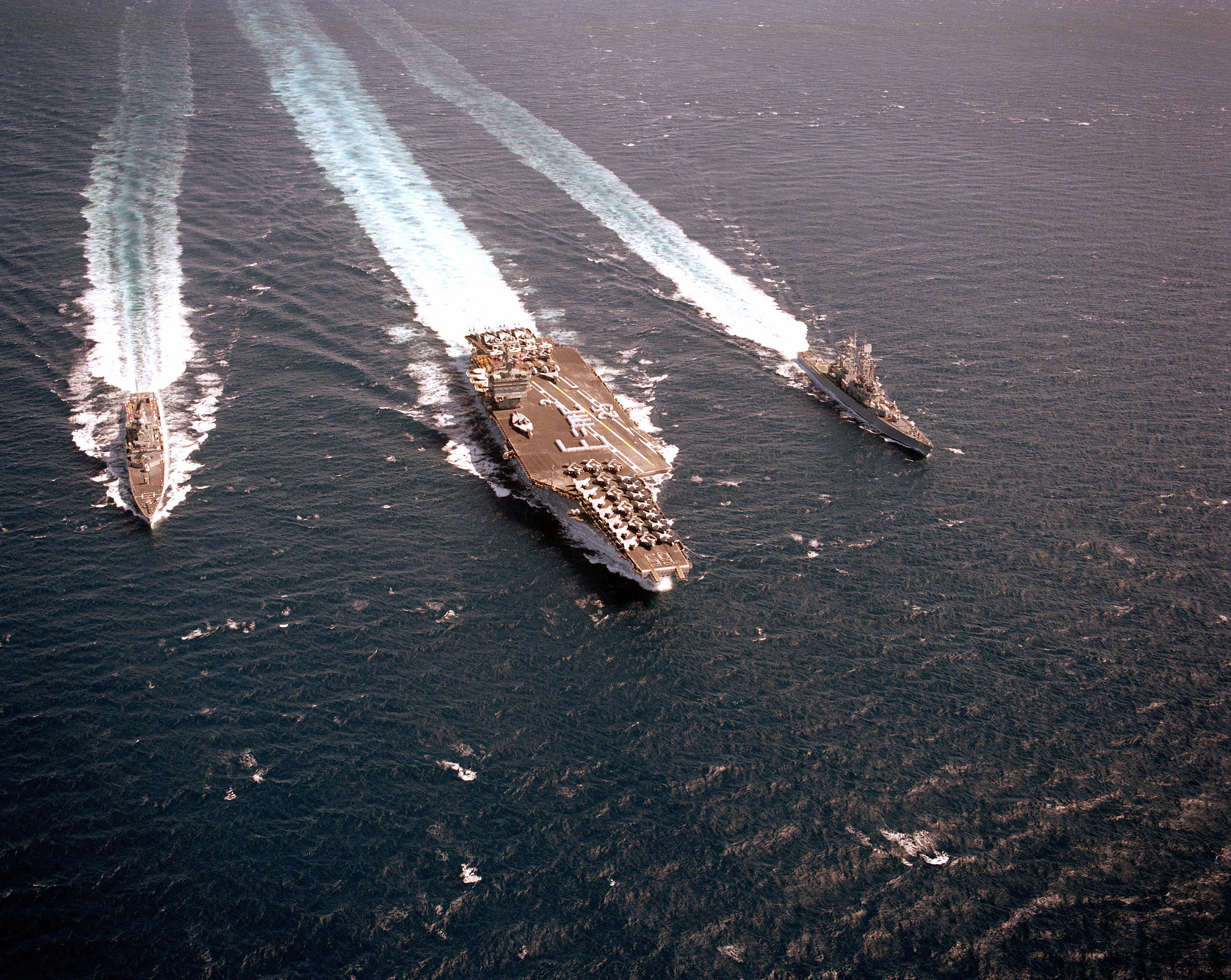
Truxtun (right) alongside Enterprise (center) and Arkansas (left) on a cruise commemorating the 25th anniversary of Operation Sea Orbit

On 26 October 1987, Truxtun deployed with Battle Group FOXTROT on her first Northern Pacific deployment and participated in one of the largest Surface Action Group exercises ever massed. Truxtun again deployed with Battle Group FOXTROT on 5 January 1988 for her 11th Western Pacific-Middle East deployment. Truxtun also participated in Operation Praying Mantis. This cruise earned Truxtun the Armed Forces Expeditionary Medal and her second Meritorious Unit Commendation. Upon return from deployment, Truxtun spent 9 months in Puget Sound Naval Shipyard undergoing a Drydocking Selective Restricted Availability. On 1 October 1989 Truxtun's homeport was shifted to Bremerton, Washington.

On 1 February 1990, Truxtun deployed with the aircraft carrier Carl Vinson in Battle Group Charlie. The Battle Group participated in TEAM SPIRIT 1990 with U.S. Marines and forces from the Republic of Korea. Truxtun, along with Battle Group Charlie, then proceeded to the Indian Ocean and North Arabian Sea, where Truxtun was tasked with escort duty in support of Operation Earnest Will, where she escorted several re-flagged Kuwaiti oil tankers through the Straits of Hormuz and the waters of the Persian Gulf. These duties earned Truxtun her second Armed Forces Expeditionary Medal. During much of this deployment, Truxtun served as Anti Air Warfare Commander, Electronic Warfare Commander and as the AAW Picket for Battle Group Charlie. Truxtun also spent a considerable amount of time steaming independently of the battle group conducting various operations and tasks, including a freedom of movement exercise through the Maldives. Port calls included Pearl Harbor Hawaii; Pusan, Korea; Subic Bay, Philippines; Singapore; Diego Garcia, British Indian Ocean Territory; Perth, Australia and Hong Kong. Truxtun returned from her 12th WESTPAC to her new home port of Bremerton Washington. Although Truxtun's home port was changed in October of the previous year, Truxtun kept port in San Diego, California while continuing work-ups for this deployment.

Truxtun departed Bremerton for her 13th WESTPAC and a Middle East deployment on 16 August 1991. Truxtun performed duties as the Persian Gulf Anti-Air Warfare Commander, Force Track Coordinator, Electronic Warfare Commander and alternate Anti-Surface Warfare Commander during Operation Desert Storm. Truxtun also served as the Commander, United States Mine Counter-Measure Group One flagship during minesweeping operations off the coastal waters of Kuwait. During her time in the Gulf, she spent most of her time guarding the 'sweeps,' wooden mine sweepers deployed to search for water-borne mines in the Gulf. Later during the same cruise while in the Gulf of Oman, Truxtun was tasked with escorting re-flagged Kuwaiti oil tankers in Operation Earnest Will.

After a short upkeep period in Bremerton, Truxtun began a two-month Counter-Narcotic mini-deployment off the coasts of Mexico and Central America, which ended in June 1992. The ship went 42 days completely unsupported by any other ship. It found no vessels moving narcotics.

From 12 February 1993 to 1 August 1993, Truxtun was underway for her 14th and final WESTPAC. On 19 February she began a high speed independent transit from Pearl Harbor, Hawaii to Melbourne, Australia covering 7,180 miles in 11 days at an average speed of 25 knots. On 21 March Truxtun rendezvoused with the Nimitz Battle Group in the Indian Ocean and transited the Strait of Hormuz. While operating in the Gulf Truxtun conducted several multi-national force exercises including operations with the Kuwaiti Air Force. On 22 April Truxtun was detached from Battle Group operations and proceeded to the Red Sea to enforce United Nations Security Council sanctions against Iraq by boarding vessels bound for the Jordanian port of Aqaba. Utilizing two teams, Truxtun queried 126 merchant vessels, boarded 73 and diverted seven ships.

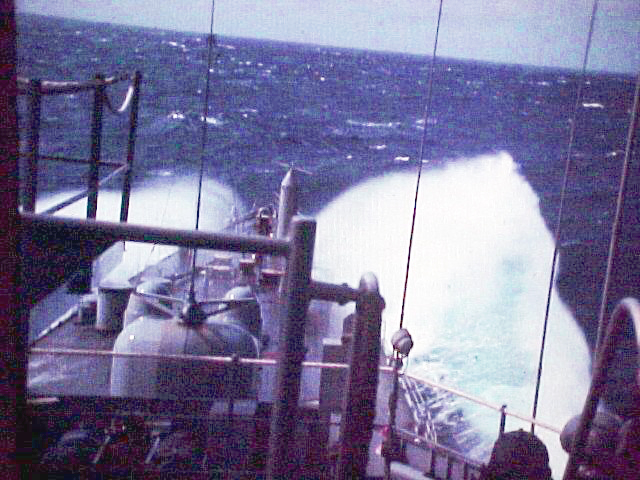
View from the O4 level as Truxtun drives through heavy weather on Westpac 1993

In 1994 Truxtun was the platform of choice for a variety of missions which included participation as opposition forces for fleet exercises, providing naval gunfire support spotter services and being Deck Landing Qualification platform for LAMPS helicopters. Truxtun also served as the escort ship for Reclaimer who towed a defueled nuclear submarine. She participated in two Chief of Naval Operations projects off the coast of San Francisco and conducted shipboard training at every opportunity. From 23 May to 17 June, Truxtun served as Coalition Forces flagship for CTF 331 during the highly successful RIMPAC 94 multi-national exercise.

On 18 August 1994 Truxtun departed Bremerton on her final operational commitment. Originally assigned to escort the tow ships for two defueled nuclear submarines from Rodman, Panama to Puget Sound Naval Shipyard, the orders were changed on short notice and Truxtun chopped (change of operational control) to Commander, Joint Task Force Four to conduct Counter-Narcotic operations for a second tour in the war on drugs. On 3 September Truxtun transited the Panama Canal for the first time in her history and began patrolling the Caribbean Sea.

On 14 October 1994 and purely by a twist of historical coincidence, Truxtun sailed the same waters in the southern Caribbean Sea where USS Constellation, under the command of Commodore Truxtun, had dueled with La Vengeance almost 200 years earlier.

== Fate ==
Truxtun was decommissioned on 11 September 1995 and was stricken from the Naval Vessel Register the same day. She has been disposed of by Ship recycling, 16 April 1999.

Truxtun was awarded seven battle stars and the Navy Unit Commendation for service in the Vietnam War.

== See also ==
- List of cruisers of the United States Navy
- Nuclear-powered cruisers of the United States Navy
