= USS Jouett (DD-396) =

Somers-class destroyer

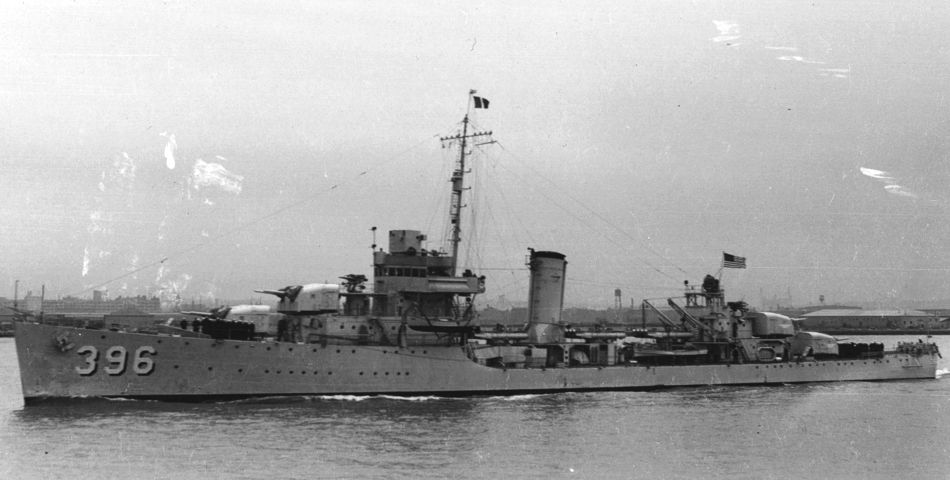
- USS Jouett during a naval review, New York, 1939

History

United States
- Name: USS Jouett (DD-396)
- Namesake: James Edward Jouett
- Builder: Bath Iron Works, Bath, Maine
- Laid down: 26 March 1936
- Launched: 24 September 1938
- Commissioned: 25 January 1939
- Decommissioned: 1 November 1945
- Honors and awards: 3 battle stars
- Fate: Scrapped, 1946

General characteristics
- Class & type: Somers-class destroyer
- Displacement: 1,850 long tons (1,880 t)
- Length: 390 ft 11 in (119.15 m)
- Beam: 36 ft 11 in (11.25 m)
- Draft: 11 ft 4 in (3.45 m)
- Propulsion: 2 × General Electric turbines, 52,000 hp (38,776 kW)
- Speed: 38 knots (70 km/h; 44 mph)
- Complement: 235
- Armament: 4 × twin 5"/38 caliber guns; 2 × quadruple 1.1"/75 caliber guns; 4 × single M2 Browning .50 caliber AA machine guns; 3 × triple 21 inch (533 mm) torpedo tubes

USS Jouett (DD-396) was a Somers-class destroyer in the United States Navy. She was named for Rear Admiral James Edward Jouett.

Jouett was laid down on 26 March 1936 by Bath Iron Works, Bath, Maine; launched on 24 September 1938, sponsored by Mrs. J. R. Todd; and commissioned at Boston, Massachusetts on 25 January 1939.

== Service history ==
Following shakedown training which took Jouett to England and Ireland, the ship returned to Norfolk, Virginia on 29 April 1939 and began operating on the Neutrality Patrol along the East and Gulf Coasts. She stood out of Pensacola Bay on 15 February 1940 as one of the escorts for Tuscaloosa, carrying President Franklin D. Roosevelt on a cruise through the Gulf of Panama, returning to Pensacola, Florida on 1 March 1940. Jouett then set course for the Panama Canal and the Pacific, arriving Pearl Harbor for duty on 10 April 1940.

The destroyer remained in Hawaiian waters during the next year exercising with aircraft carriers and perfecting tactics. Sailing on 18 April 1941, Jouett accompanied Yorktown through the canal to Cuba, proceeding from there to Port of Spain, Trinidad, on 19 May. The ship then joined a cruiser and destroyer force under Rear Admiral Jonas H. Ingram charged with guarding against German surface or submarine attacks on American shipping. Jouett was at Port of Spain on 7 December 1941 when the Japanese attack on Pearl Harbor brought America into the war. The ship then began offensive antisubmarine patrols between Brazil and Africa, helping to keep the ocean supply lines open. She accompanied Army engineers to Ascension Island on 30 March 1942, where an airfield was built. Jouett convoyed the oil tankers from Trinidad south during the months that followed, often attacking submarines with depth charges. In December 1942, the ship returned to Charleston, South Carolina for repairs, but by 21 January 1943 she was back in Natal harbor, Brazil.

Jouett received President Getúlio Vargas of Brazil on 27 January 1943, providing quarters for him and his party during conferences on board Humboldt with President Roosevelt. Following the talks, which cemented relations between the countries and provided for closer naval cooperation, President Vargas departed Jouett on 29 January.

The veteran destroyer resumed her escort duties in February, and 14 May joined in the search for U-128 off Bahia, Brazil. Aircraft dropped depth charges on the U-boat and brought her to the surface where gunfire from Jouett and Moffett sent her to the bottom. The destroyer continued to serve with Admiral Ingram's antisubmarine force, now 4th Fleet, through the rest of 1943. On New Year's Day 1944 she joined Omaha for ocean patrol; and the ships intercepted German blockade runner SS Rio Grande, with a cargo of crude rubber. After the crew abandoned ship, Omaha and Jouett sank the German ship. This effective closing of the South Atlantic to German blockade runners was demonstrated even more forcefully on 5 January when patrol planes reported a strange ship identifying herself as Floridian. Intelligence identified her, however, as blockade runner Burgenlund. Before aerial attacks could begin Omaha and Jouett picked her up on radar and closed in. Scuttling charges and the cruiser's gunfire sank her just after 17:30.

Jouett returned to Charleston once more in March 1944 and engaged in training operations in Casco Bay, Maine, before sailing for England in convoy on 16 May 1944. There she joined a Reserve Fire Support Group for the invasion of France. Jouett arrived off Omaha Beach on 8 June, escorting coastal steamers with support troops embarked. She repelled an air attack that day, and until 21 June screened British heavy cruisers during shore bombardment and provided antisubmarine screen for the Omaha Beach transport area. The second front established, Jouett escorted convoys to and from the Firth of Clyde until 12 July 1944 when she sailed with a convoy for Algeria.

The destroyer arrived at Oran on 21 July to prepare for the next major European operation, the invasion of southern France. Departing Naples on 14 August, Jouett arrived off the Delta assault area next day and, as troops landed, acted as command ship of the Convoy Control Group charged with the smooth routing and unloading of support troops. This duty continued until 3 September, after which the ship operated on patrol out of Toulon. In early October Jouett steamed off Cap Ferrat, giving gunfire support to American troops in the fighting ashore. She also destroyed mines off San Remo on 9 October, destroyed bridges, and covered Allied minesweeping operations in the area.

Jouett sailed from Oran on 31 December 1944 for repairs at Charleston. After refresher training in Casco Bay in April, the battle-tested ship made convoy voyages to England and Cuba before the end of the war on 15 August 1945.

== Fate ==
She was decommissioned at Philadelphia Naval Shipyard on 1 November 1945, and was scrapped there in 1946.

== Honors ==
Jouett received three battle stars for World War II service.
