= USS Jouett (CG-29) =

1962 Belknap-class cruiser

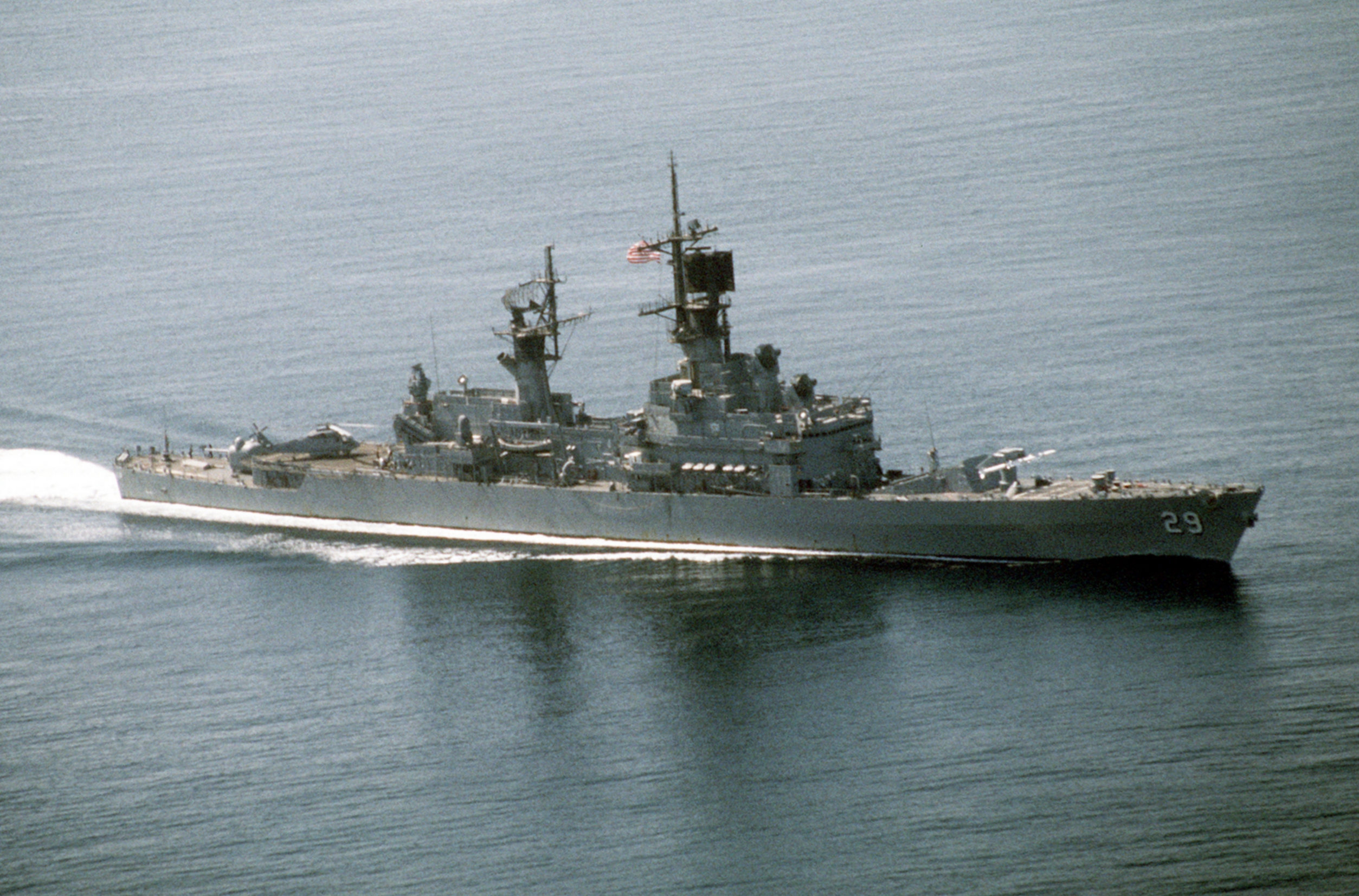
- USS Jouett (CG-29) in 1992

History

United States
- Name: Jouett
- Namesake: James Edward Jouett
- Ordered: 20 September 1961
- Builder: Puget Sound Naval Shipyard
- Laid down: 25 September 1962
- Launched: 30 June 1964
- Sponsored by: Mrs. S. J. Ervin, Jr
- Acquired: 23 February 1967
- Commissioned: 3 December 1966
- Decommissioned: 28 January 1994
- Reclassified: CG-29 on 30 June 1975
- Stricken: 28 January 1994
- Motto: Eternal Vigilance
- Fate: Sunk as target, 10 August 2007
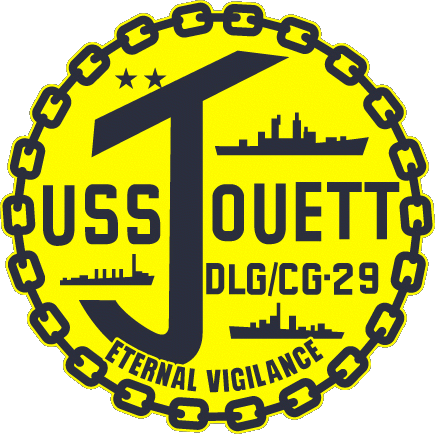
- Badge

General characteristics
- Class & type: Belknap-class cruiser
- Displacement: 7,900 tons
- Length: 547 ft (167 m)
- Beam: 54 ft 9 in (16.69 m)
- Draught: 14 ft 9 in (4.50 m)
- Draft: 28 ft
- Propulsion: Two sets GE or De laval steam turbines. total 85,000 shp
- Speed: maximum speed 30+ knots
- Complement: 418
- Sensors & processing systems: AN/SPS-48E air-search radar; AN/SPS-49(V)5 air-search radar; AN/SPG-55B fire-control radar; AN/SPG-53F gun fire-control radar; AN/SQS-26 sonar
- Electronic warfare & decoys: AN/SLQ-32
- Armament: one Mark 42 5 in (130 mm)/54 gun, two 3 in (76 mm)/50 guns, one Terrier missile / SM-2ER launcher, six 15.5-inch torpedo tubes, Harpoon missiles, Phalanx CIWS
- Aircraft carried: DASH drone helicopter

USS Jouett (DLG-29) was a Belknap-class cruiser laid down 25 September 1962 by Puget Sound Naval Shipyard, Bremerton, Washington; launched 30 June 1964; sponsored by Mrs. S. J. Ervin, Jr., wife of the Senator from North Carolina; and commissioned 3 December 1966. She was named after RADM James Edward Jouett

== Service ==
Upon completion of fitting out in February 1967, Jouett was assigned to Cruiser-Destroyer Force, U.S. Pacific Fleet, and operated out of her homeport, San Diego.

Reclassified as a guided-missile cruiser, CG-29, on 30 June 1975, Jouett was decommissioned and stricken from the Navy Register on 28 January 1994 at San Diego. She was transferred 30 March the same year to the Maritime Administration, she was laid up at the Suisun Bay, CA reserve.

On 10 August 2007, she was towed to the Pacific to perform her last service; she was sunk as a target ship as part of Exercise Valiant Shield 2007. She sank at 11°16′00″N 143°53′00″E, at a depth of 7,500 metres.

== After-Effects ==
The ship's bell is currently outside the entrance to the Navy Entomology Center of Excellence Naval Air Station in Jacksonville, Florida. The bell is on loan from the Navy History and Heritage Command.
