= USS Daniel T. Griffin =

Buckley-class destroyer escort

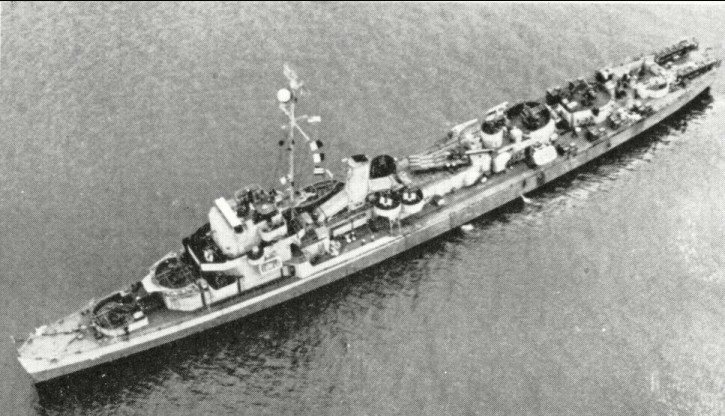
- USS Daniel T. Griffin (DE-54)

History

United States
- Name: USS Daniel T. Griffin
- Namesake: Daniel T. Griffin
- Ordered: 1942
- Builder: Bethlehem Hingham Shipyard
- Laid down: 7 September 1942
- Launched: 25 February 1943
- Reclassified: APD-38, 23 October 1944
- Commissioned: 9 June 1943
- Decommissioned: 30 May 1946
- Stricken: 1 December 1966
- Honors and awards: 1 battle star (World War II)
- Fate: Transferred to Chile, 15 November 1966

History

Chile
- Name: Virgilio Uribe (APD-29)
- Acquired: 15 November 1966
- Decommissioned: 30 May 1995
- Fate: Scrapped, 1995

General characteristics
- Class & type: Buckley-class destroyer escort
- Displacement: 1,400 long tons (1,422 t) light; 1,740 long tons (1,768 t) standard
- Length: 306 ft (93 m)
- Beam: 37 ft (11 m)
- Draft: 9 ft 6 in (2.90 m) standard; 11 ft 3 in (3.43 m) full load
- Propulsion: 2 × boilers; General Electric turbo-electric drive; 12,000 shp (8.9 MW); 2 × solid manganese-bronze 3,600 lb (1,600 kg) 3-bladed propellers, 8 ft 6 in (2.59 m) diameter, 7 ft 7 in (2.31 m) pitch; 2 × rudders; 359 tons fuel oil
- Speed: 23 knots (43 km/h; 26 mph)
- Range: 3,700 nmi (6,900 km) at 15 kn (28 km/h; 17 mph); 6,000 nmi (11,000 km) at 12 kn (22 km/h; 14 mph)
- Complement: 15 officers, 198 men
- Armament: 3 × 3"/50 caliber guns; 1 × quad 1.1"/75 caliber gun; 8 × single 20 mm guns; 1 × triple 21 inch (533 mm) torpedo tubes; 1 × Hedgehog anti-submarine mortar; 8 × K-gun depth charge projectors; 2 × depth charge tracks

USS Daniel T. Griffin (DE-54/APD-38), a Buckley-class destroyer escort of the United States Navy, was named in honor of Ordnanceman Daniel T. Griffin (1911–1941), who was killed in action during the Japanese attack on the Hawaiian Islands.

== Namesake ==
Daniel Thornburg Griffin was born on 25 March 1911 in Allendale, Illinois. He enlisted in the Navy on 6 October 1930 and served continuously until his death in his PBY Catalina during the Japanese Attack on Pearl Harbor on 7 December 1941. Aviation Machinist's Mate First Class Griffin was cited by Commander-in-Chief, Pacific Fleet, for his prompt and efficient action and his utter disregard of personal danger in the defense of Naval Air Station Kaneohe Bay. He was first buried in Hawaii in December 1941 and was reinterred in Colorado Springs in October 1947.

== Construction and commissioning ==
Daniel T. Griffin was launched on 25 February 1943 by the Bethlehem-Hingham Shipyard, Hingham, Massachusetts, sponsored by Mrs. D. T. Griffin, and commissioned on 9 June.

== Service history ==
After a voyage escorting a convoy to Casablanca, French Morocco, between 15 August and 24 September 1943 Daniel T. Griffin took up convoy duty between New York and Northern Ireland, making eight transatlantic voyages between 13 October 1943 and 23 September 1944. She arrived at Staten Island, New York on 22 October for conversion to a Charles Lawrence-class high speed transport. She was reclassified APD-38 on 23 October 1944.

Sailing from Norfolk on 13 January 1945 Daniel T. Griffin arrived at Pearl Harbor on 6 February to serve with Underwater Demolition Teams. She cleared on 14 February on convoy duty to Ulithi and Kossol Passage, then arrived at San Pedro Bay, Leyte, on 5 March for invasion rehearsals off Hononhan Island. On 19 March she got underway for Kerama Retto, arriving on the 26th. During the assault on Okinawa, she screened ships at Kerama Retto and swept mines, delivered explosives to the Okinawa beaches, and then acted as rescue ship until 18 May. On 6 April she fought off several suicide attacks destroying at least two enemy planes. When the destroyer Morris (DD-417) was hit Daniel T. Griffin protected her against further attack assisted in putting out her fires, and escorted her into Kerama Retto.

Daniel T. Griffin served on local escort duty at Saipan between 20 May and 19 June 1945, then escorted a convoy back to Okinawa, and another from Okinawa to Ulithi. On 11 July she arrived in San Pedro Bay, Leyte, for varied duty in the Philippines until 22 September when she sailed with occupation troops to Kure, Japan, landing her passengers from 6 to 11 October. Returning to Manila on 16 October she redeployed troops in the Philippines until 2 December when she sailed for the United States. She called briefly at San Diego, arrived at Norfolk on 11 January 1946 and Green Cove Springs, Florida, on 4 March. She was placed out of commission in reserve there on 30 May 1946.

== Virgilio Uribe (APD-29) ==
Daniel T. Griffin was transferred to Chile on 15 November 1966, and renamed Luis Virgilio Uribe (APD-29). She was decommissioned and broken up for scrap in 1995.

== Awards ==
Daniel T. Griffin received one battle star for World War II service.
