= Matthew Harris Jouett =

American painter (1788–1827)

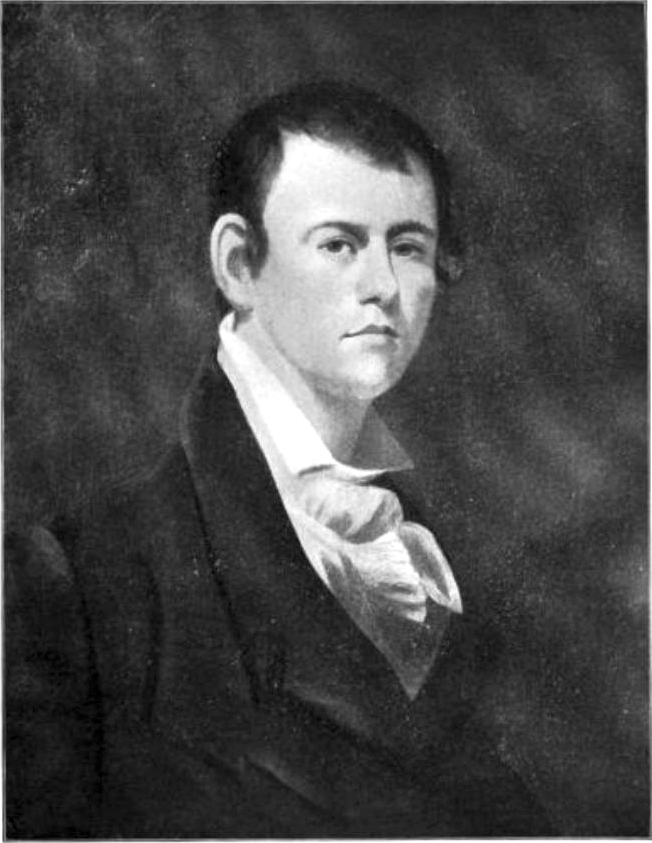
- Copy of a self-portrait
- Born: April 22, 1788; Mercer County, Kentucky, U.S.
- Died: August 10, 1827 (aged 39); Lexington, Kentucky, U.S.
- Resting place: Cave Hill Cemetery; Louisville, Kentucky, U.S.
- Occupation: Painter
- Spouse: Margaret "Peggy" Henderson Allen (m. 1812)
- Children: 9, including James Edward
- Father: Jack Jouett
- Military career
- Allegiance: United States
- Branch: Kentucky Militia; United States Army
- Service years: 1812–1815
- Rank: Captain
- Units: 3rd Mounted Regiment of Kentucky Volunteers; 28th Infantry Regiment
- Conflicts: War of 1812; Battle of Frenchtown

Matthew Harris Jouett (April 22, 1788 – August 10, 1827) was an American painter who specialized in portrait painting and painted portraits of prominent Americans such as Thomas Jefferson, George Rogers Clark, and the Marquis de Lafayette.

== Personal life and career ==
Jouett was the son of Sallie Robards and Jack Jouett, a hero of the American Revolution. The younger Jouett graduated from Transylvania University. He studied law in Frankfort, Kentucky, for one year with the chief justice of Kentucky's Appellate Court, Judge George M. Bibb. The father supposedly commented about the son's career "I sent Matthew to college to make a gentleman of him, and he has turned out to be nothing but a damned sign painter."

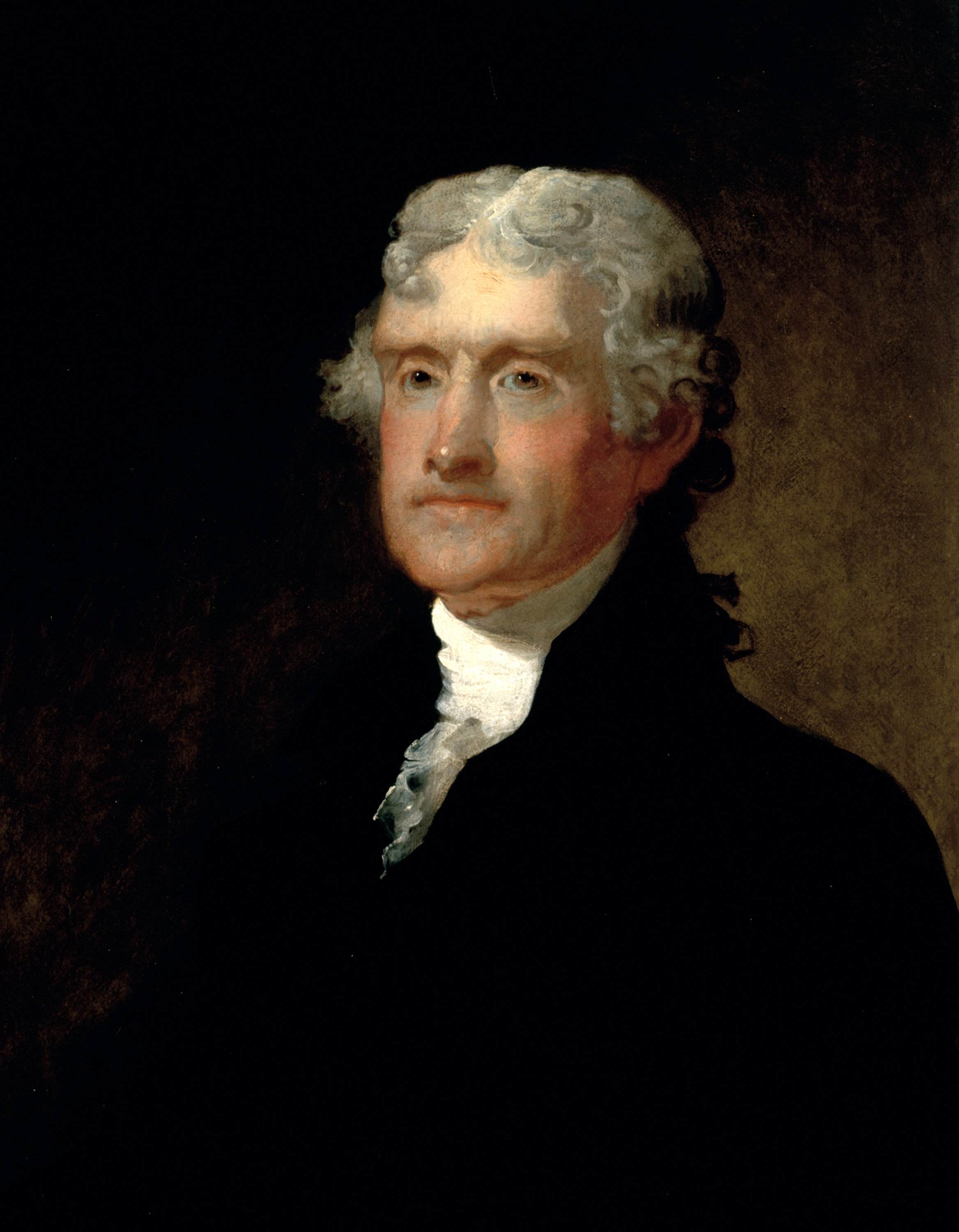
Portrait of Thomas Jefferson

Jouett served as a junior officer of the 28th Infantry Regiment during the War of 1812 and was among the survivors of the Battle of Frenchtown. The company payroll of $6000 disappeared during the slaughter. Jouett restored the missing funds to the militia, based on his earnings as a painter. He also painted portraits of his fellow soldiers from memory, including Hart and Colonel Allen.

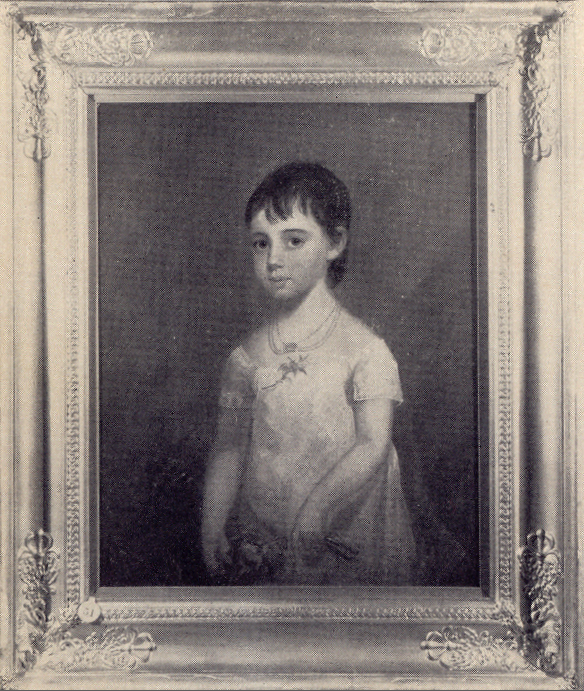
Portrait of Catherine Cornelia Prather

Matthew Harris Jouett married Margaret "Peggy" Henderson Allen of Lexington, Kentucky on May 25, 1812. They had nine children. Jouett was promoted to captain during the War of 1812. Afterwards, he studied portraiture and went to Boston to study with Gilbert Stuart in 1816.

He painted in New Orleans from 1817 to 1827 during the winter season and was listed in the 1824 New Orleans Directory as a portrait painter working at 49 Canal Street. He was commissioned by the Kentucky legislature to paint a portrait of the Marquis de Lafayette. Jouett also painted Thomas Jefferson and the child Catherine Cornelia Prather.

It wasn't until the 1893 Chicago World Fair, that his fame as a painter began. His paintings were greatly appreciated by the curators and the general public. His work is more collectible today than it was during his lifetime, and as such catches higher prices. Jouett became one of the most highly esteemed portrait painters in the United States, honored with a major centenary exhibition at the Speed Museum in his home state.

Matthew Jouett died in Lexington, Kentucky in 1827 is buried in Cave Hill Cemetery.

== Works ==
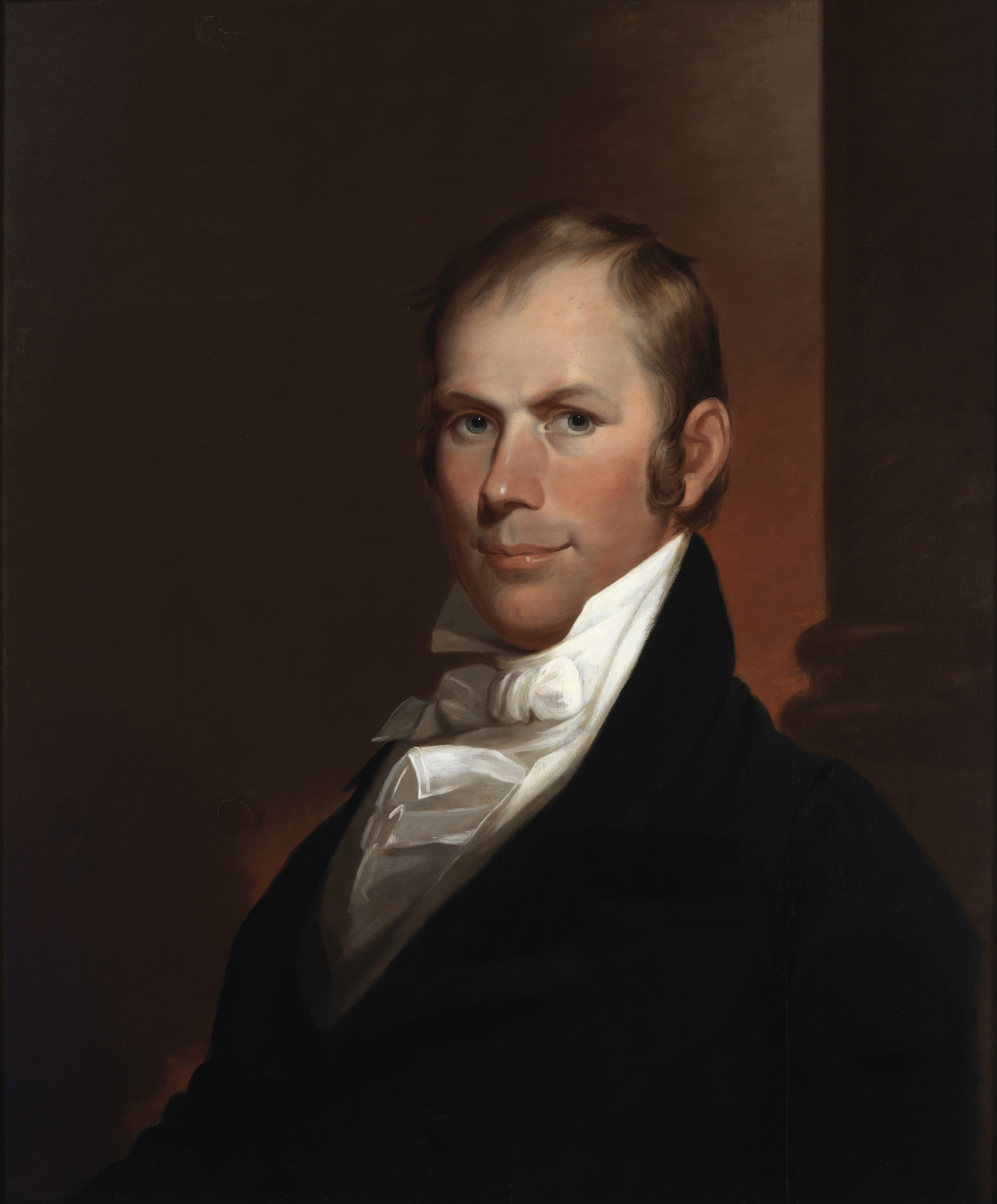
Henry Clay, 1818, Transylvania University

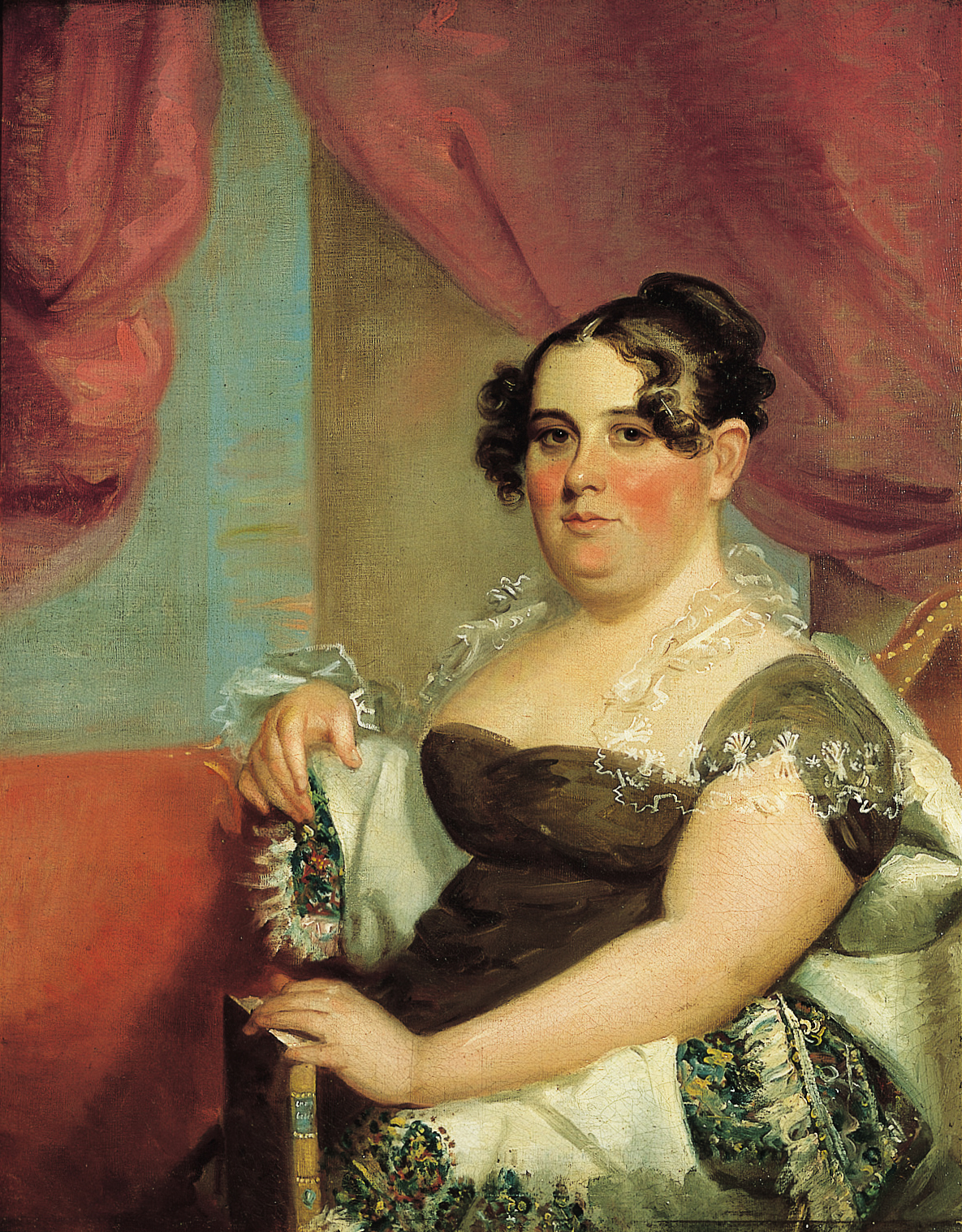
Portrait of Sarah Low Norton, c. 1820–1825, Speed Art Museum

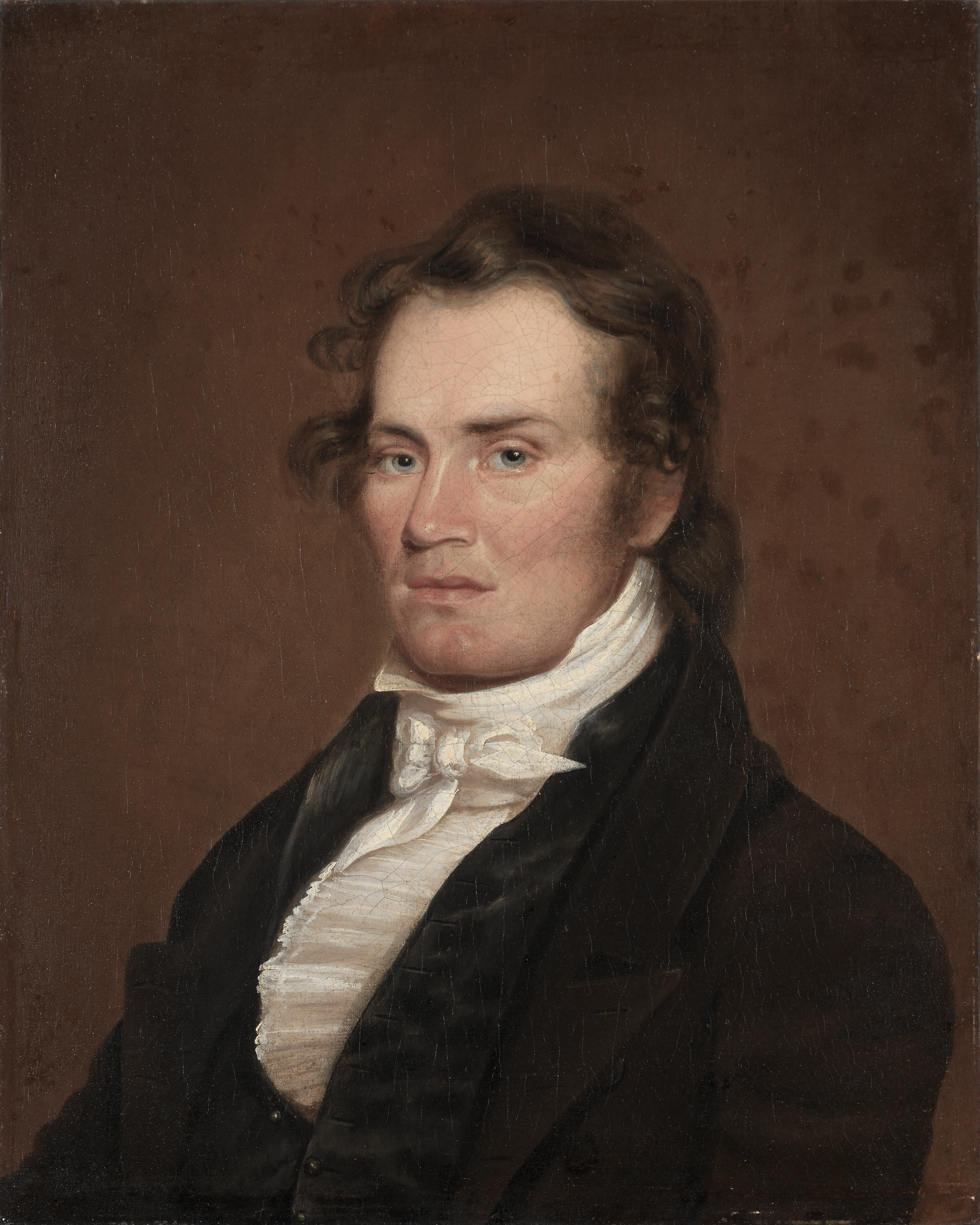
James G. McKinney, Cleveland Museum of Art

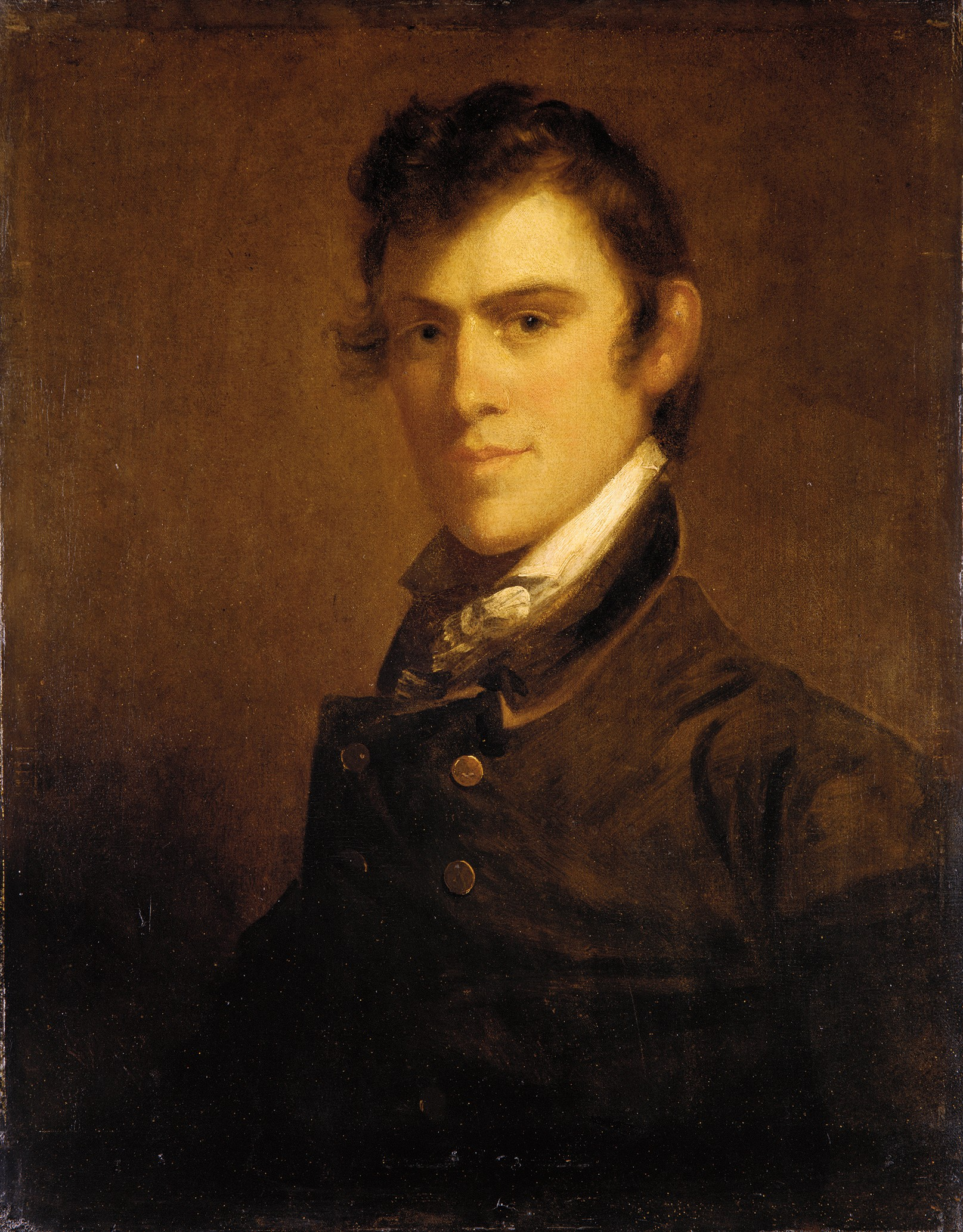
John Grimes, c. 1824, Metropolitan Museum of Art

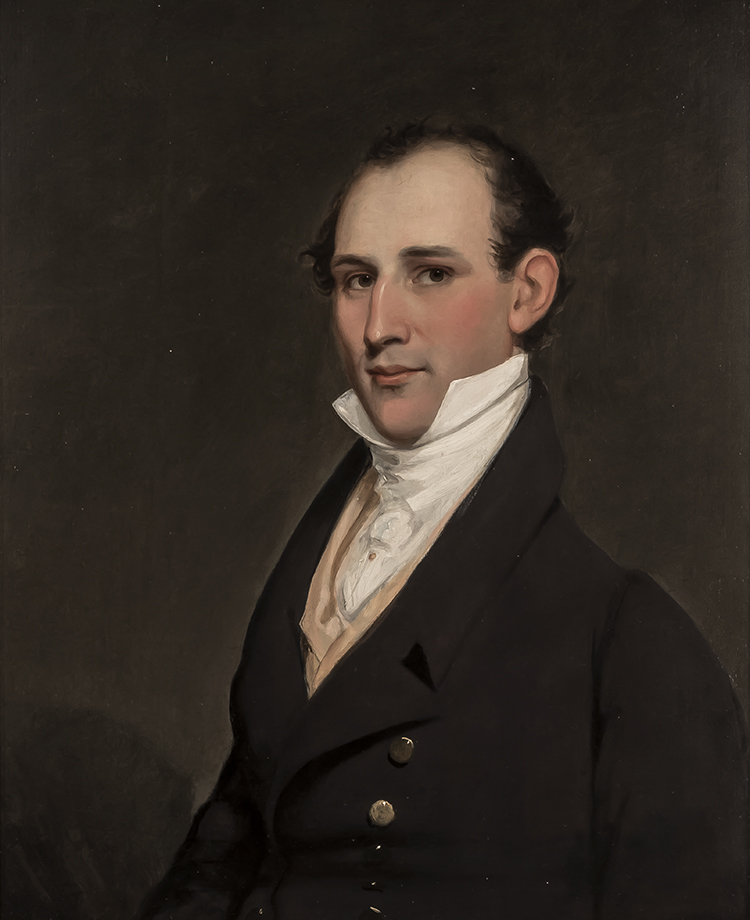
Tobias Gibson, c. 1825–1827, Museum of Early Southern Decorative Arts

== See also ==
James Edward Jouett - one of Matthew Harris Jouett's sons, is immortalized in Admiral David Farragut's quote from the American Civil War Battle of Mobile Bay - "Damn the torpedoes! Four bells! Captain Drayton go ahead! Jouett full speed!"

== Sources ==
- Encyclopedia of Kentucky. New York, New York: Somerset Publishers. 1987. pp. 151–152. ISBN 0-403-09981-1.
- Floyd, William Barrow. Matthew Harris Jouett: Portraitist of the Ante-Bellum South. 1980. Transylvania Printing Company, Lexington, KY.
- Mills, Sally. "Jouett, Matthew Harris." In Grove Art Online. Oxford Art Online, (accessed January 4, 2012; subscription required).
- Pennington, Estill Curtis (2011). Lessons in Likeness: Portrait Painters in Kentucky and the Ohio River Valley, 1802-1920. Lexington: University Press of Kentucky. pp. 172–173. ISBN 978-0-8131-2612-8.
- "Large Crowd Attends Opening Of Eighteenth Art Exhibit: Handsome Canvases To Be Catalogued To-day For Ten-day Reviewal". Louisville, Kentucky: Courier-Journal. April 17, 1915. p. 7. "Attendance at the eighteenth exhibit of the Louisville Art Association . . . . Two portraits by Jouett, the famous Kentucky artist, are shown. One is of former Secretary of Commerce Nagel. The other is of a little girl, Katherine Prather, who afterwards became the wife of the Rev. Dr. Edward Humphrey. The portrait . . . is referred to by members of the Humphrey family as "Little Grandmother.""
- "Jouett Centenary: Portraits Shown at the Speed Museum". The Courier-Journal. February 26, 1928. p. 28. "The 100th anniversary of Matthew Harris Jouett is being celebrated by an exhibition of his portraits loaned by the owners to the J.B.Speed Memorial Museum. . . . Among the portraits shown which are properties of Louisvillians are the following: . . . Self portrait of Matthew H. Jouett owned by Mr. E. S. Jouett. . . .Judge John McKinley owned by Judge A. P. Humphrey . . . .General George Rogers Clark, owned by the Filson Club. . . . Catherine Cornelia Prather, owned by Mrs. Lewis C. Humphrey . . . . Mrs. Matthew Harris Jouett owned by Mr. Richard F. Menefee . . . . The Jouett Home owned by Mr. Richard H. Menefee . . . . There are three portraits of George Washington by Gilbert Stuart owned by the Filson Club."
- "SIRIS - Smithsonian Institution Research Information System". siris-artinventories.si.edu.
