= Jack Jouett =

American farmer, politician, and militiaman (1754–1822)

John Jouett
- The only known depiction of Jack Jouett made while he was living, a silhouette by his son, Matthew

Member of the Virginia House of Delegates from the Lincoln County district
- In office October 16, 1786 – July 15, 1787 Serving with Benjamin Logan
- Preceded by: John Edwards
- Succeeded by: Baker Ewing

Member of the Virginia House of Delegates from the Mercer County district
- In office October 15, 1787 – June 22, 1788 Serving with William McDowell
- Preceded by: N/A
- Succeeded by: Samuel Taylor
- In office October 18, 1790 – October 16, 1791 Serving with Anthony Crockett
- Preceded by: Samuel Taylor
- Succeeded by: Samuel Taylor

Member of the Kentucky House of Representatives from the Mercer County district
- In office 1792–1792

Member of the Kentucky House of Representatives from the Woodford County district
- In office 1795–1797

Personal details
- Born: December 7, 1754 Albemarle County, Virginia, British America
- Died: March 1, 1822 (aged 67) Bath County, Kentucky, U.S.
- Resting place: Bath County, Kentucky, U.S.
- Occupation: farmer, officer, politician

Military service
- Allegiance: United Colonies (prior to 1776); United States of America (after 1776)
- Years of service: 1775–1780
- Rank: Major
- Unit: 16th Virginia militia
- Battles/wars: American Revolutionary War

Jack Jouett Jr. (December 7, 1754 – March 1, 1822) was an American farmer and politician in Virginia and Kentucky best known for his 40-mile (60 km) ride during the American Revolution in 1781. Sometimes called the "Paul Revere of the South", Jouett rode to warn Thomas Jefferson, then the outgoing governor of Virginia (and the Virginia legislature who had fled the new state's capitol before electing his successor) that British cavalry had been sent to capture them.

After the war, Jouett moved across the Appalachian Mountains to what was then called Kentucky County. He thrice served in the Virginia House of Delegates, first representing Lincoln County and later Mercer County before Kentucky's statehood (which occurred in 1792). Jouett also represented Mercer County at the Danville Separation Convention in 1788. He later served three terms in the Kentucky House of Representatives, first representing Mercer County, then adjoining Woodford County.

== Jouett family ==
Coat of Arms of John (Jack) Jouett

Jack Jouett was born to tavernkeeper John Jouett Sr. and his wife, Mourning Harris. The elder Jouett held a license to operate the Swan "ordinary" (tavern) in Albemarle County, Virginia. He owned 13 black slaves in 1790, which number declined to 11 slaves in 1799.

His paternal grandfather, Jean Jouett, was a French Huguenot who had settled in Virginia in the early 1700s. His paternal ancestors were an old Norman aristocratic family from Touraine, directly descended from Matthieu de Jouhet, Master of the Horse to King Louis XIII, Lord of Leveignac, and a lieutenant in the Marshalsea of Limousin. Matthieu de Jouhet's grandson, Daniel de Jouet, emigrated to the Narragansett country (Britain's Rhode Island colony) in 1686. Daniel's youngest son, Jean (this Jack's grandfather) settled in Virginia.

Jack Jouett's mother, Mourning Harris, was a daughter of Revolutionary War veteran Harrison Harris (1725–1795), and a descendant of Sir William Harris, who signed the third Virginia charter and was knighted in 1611. Another maternal relation was Col. William Claiborne, first secretary of the Virginia colony.

== American Revolutionary War ==
Jack Jouett became a captain in the 16th Regiment of the Virginia militia during the American Revolutionary War, during which all three of his brothers also served. A physically imposing, as well as muscular and handsome man, Jack stood 6 ft 4 in (1.93 m) tall and weighed 220 lb (100 kg). His father, John Jouett Sr., was also very active in the revolutionary cause in Albemarle County, Virginia, and supplied the militia with meat for its rations, as well as supporting his sons' service. Both Jouett and his father, John Sr., were among the 202 Albemarle citizens who had signed the Albemarle Declaration, a document renouncing King George III. One brother was killed at the Battle of Brandywine.

== Jack Jouett's ride ==
=== Background: the British plan ===
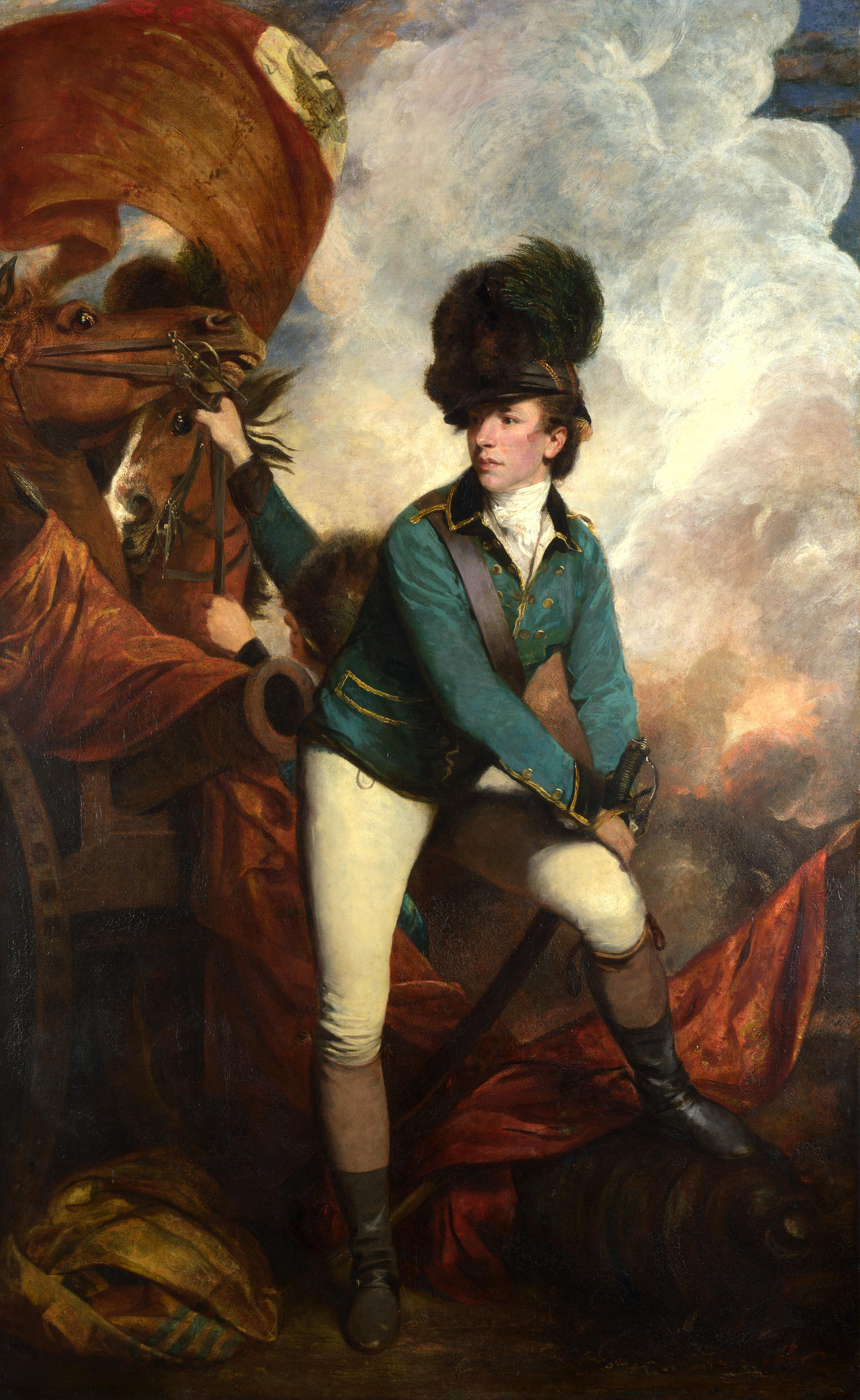
Portrait of Banastre Tarleton by Sir Joshua Reynolds, 1782.

On June 1, 1781, British General Cornwallis, while moving his troops from Petersburg to Goochland County, learned from a captured dispatch that Governor Thomas Jefferson and Virginia's legislature had fled from Richmond to Charlottesville, Virginia, to the location of Jefferson's home, Monticello. Members of Virginia's government had escaped to Charlottesville after Benedict Arnold, who had defected to the British, attacked Virginia's capital, Richmond. Cornwallis also learned the rebel colonists had stockpiled military supplies at the Old Albemarle Courthouse in Scott's Landing, then a settlement featuring a ferry across the James River (although superseded as the Albemarle County seat in favor of Charlottesville about a decade earlier). Cornwallis ordered Lieutenant Colonel Banastre Tarleton to ride to Charlottesville and capture Governor Jefferson and the members of the legislature, and Colonel John Graves Simcoe to destroy the colonists' military supplies at Point of Fork and Scotts Landing. Legislators targeted for capture included Patrick Henry, Richard Henry Lee, Thomas Nelson Jr., and Benjamin Harrison V.

On June 3, Tarleton left Cornwallis's camp on the North Anna River with 180 cavalrymen and 70 mounted infantry of the Royal Welsh Fusiliers. Tarleton marched his force covertly and planned to cover the last 70 miles to Charlottesville in 24 hours, a fast maneuver intended to catch the politicians completely unaware. His orders from Cornwallis, however, were to first destroy the military supplies at Scott's Landing before General Lafayette and his men, marching from Baltimore, Maryland, could interfere.

=== Ride begins ===
Jouett, who was then 27 years old, lay asleep on the lawn of the Cuckoo Tavern (although an account by Thomas Jefferson says Jouett was at his father's house) in Louisa County, Virginia, on the night of June 3, 1781. During the night, he heard the sound of approaching cavalry and spotted Col. Tarleton's British cavalry.

Jouett suspected that the cavalry was marching to Charlottesville to capture the members of Virginia's government. Jouett knew that the legislature was completely undefended. Very little fighting had taken place on Virginia soil from 1776 to 1780, so most of Virginia's forces were deployed elsewhere. The British had only recently begun significant campaigns in Virginia, so few forces were in the state except local militia. Jefferson and the legislators needed advance warning to escape. Jouett quickly mounted his horse and, at about 10 pm, began the 40-mile ride from Louisa to Charlottesville. With the British cavalry on the main highway, Jouett had to take the rough backwoods trails to the overgrown Old Mountain Road, likely traveling only with the light of the full moon. He needed to ride fast enough to outrun the British.

=== Col. Tarleton's travels ===
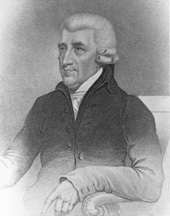
John Walker

At 11:30 pm, Tarleton paused for a three-hour rest at Louisa Courthouse. He began his march again at about 2 am. He soon encountered a train of 13 supply wagons at Boswell's Tavern bound for South Carolina where General Nathanael Greene led the main branch of the Continental Army in the South. Tarleton burned the wagons and continued onward.

Around dawn, Tarleton reached the plantations of Castle Hill, Doctor Thomas Walker's home, and a splinter group of British arrived at Belvoir, the home of his son, Continental Congress member John Walker. Tarleton captured or paroled various important figures at the two plantations. Dr. Walker supposedly prepared an elaborate breakfast (including alcohol), for Tarleton in order to allow more time for Jefferson and the legislature to get warning of the cavalry, but that might be apocryphal. Tarleton's account says he did pause at Castle Hill for a half-hour rest. (Note: Anthony M. Hance recorded the story of the delay at Castle Hill in his book Tarleton's Fox Hunt but he quotes Bradley S. Johnson saying instead that "his daughter rode at speed to warn Jefferson and the other rebels." The word "his" in Hance's/Johnson's case seems to refer to a Colonel Rives' daughter - "When Tarleton got to ‘Castle Hill,’ about twenty miles from Charlottesville, its owner, Colonel Rives, ... while his daughter ..." but at the time Castle Hill was not owned by a Colonel Rives but was instead owned by its builder Thomas Walker. The house did later pass on by inheritance into the Rives family.)

=== Warning at Monticello ===
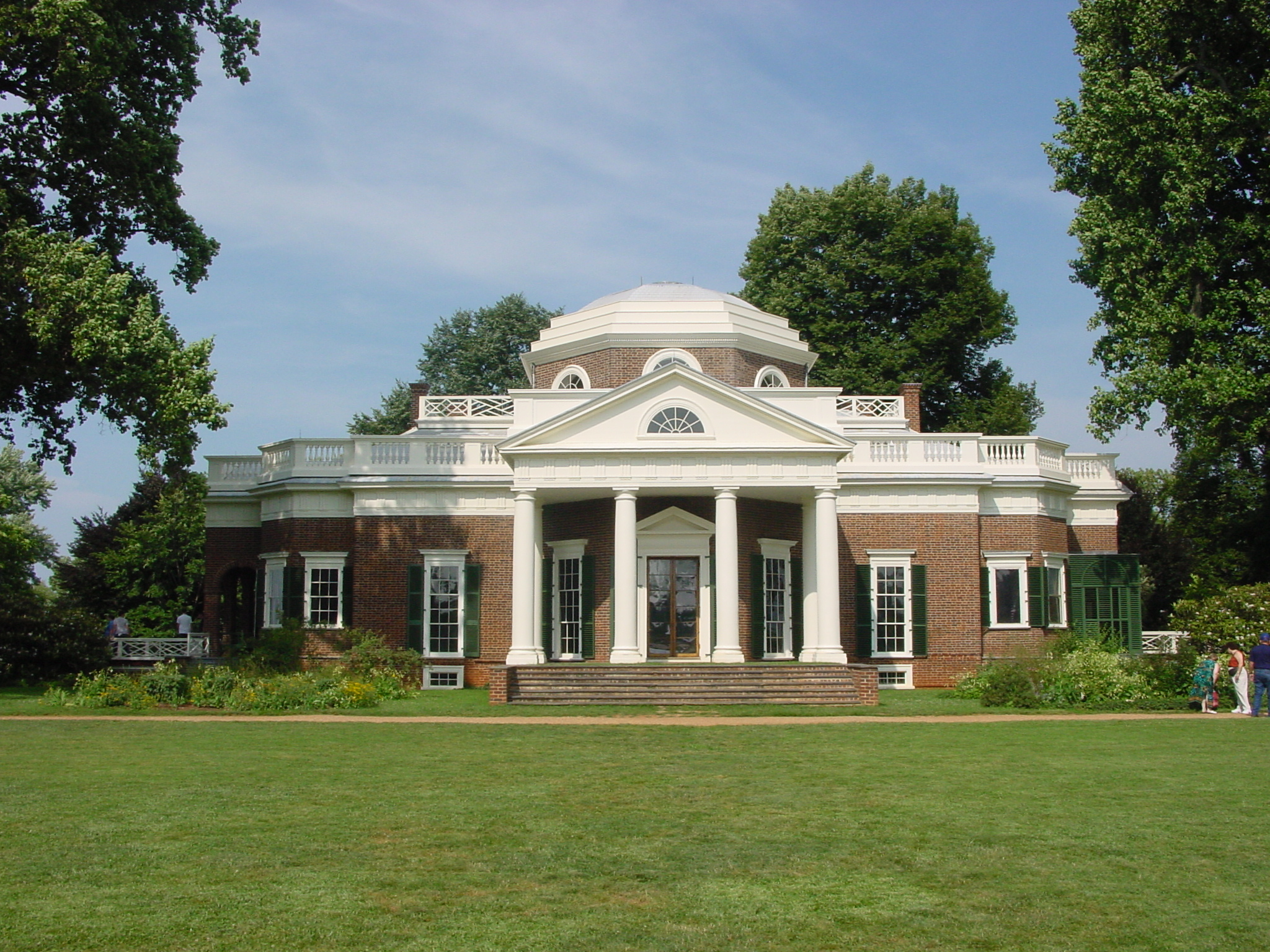
Thomas Jefferson's Monticello

Jouett's backwoods route took him through a ford of the Rivanna River at the town of Milton. At about 4:30 am, he crossed the ford and ascended the mountain on which Jefferson's Monticello sits. At Monticello, Jouett woke Jefferson and his guests, several Virginia legislators. Descendants of Jefferson's gardener, Anthony Giannini, noted early riser Jefferson was in the gardens at Monticello with their ancestor when Jouett arrived. Jefferson rewarded Jouett with some fine Madeira. Jouett then remounted to ride 2 miles (3 km) further to warn the town of Charlottesville.

Jefferson did not rush, although he sent his wife and daughters to Enniscorthy, his friend John Coles' plantation about 14 miles (23 km) away. He had breakfast with the legislators before making arrangements to leave, including spending two hours gathering his papers together. When Captain Christopher Hudson rode to Monticello to warn of the imminent British arrival, Jefferson continued his preparations, but sent a horse outside his estate for a quick escape. He continually checked the Charlottesville path up the mountain with his telescope for signs of the British. By the time he finally saw them, the British cavalry had reached Monticello's lawn. Mounting his horse quickly, Jefferson successfully eluded the British in the woods. One enslaved Monticello family's oral history claims Jefferson "hid in the hollow of an old tree" on nearby Carter's Mountain. Other traditions claim Jefferson spent two weeks at the home of Thomas Farrar, and some time in a cliff-cave near Scotts's Landing about a mile downstream from his brother Randolph's plantation, "Snowden", while Tarleton commandeered Jefferson's "Elk Hill" plantation in Goochland County.

Captain Kenneth McLeod led the British detachment sent to Monticello. They arrived to find Jefferson's slaves hurriedly hiding his valuables.

=== Ride to Charlottesville ===
After leaving Monticello, Jouett rode to the Swan Tavern (owned by Jouett's father) where most of the legislators were staying. The legislators decided to flee and reconvene in Staunton, 35 miles (56 km) west, in three days, on June 7. Jouett's warning allowed most legislators to escape; however, seven were captured.

Jouett also helped General Edward Stevens escape. The general was recovering at the Swan Tavern from wounds he received at the Battle of Guilford Courthouse. Jouett rode with General Stevens as he made his escape, but the wounded Stevens could not ride quickly enough to keep the British from catching up. Jouett was wearing an ornate military costume with a scarlet coat and a plumed hat, and Stevens was dressed in shoddy clothing. British cavalry assumed that Jouett must be a high military officer, so they ignored the shabby general, and pursued Jouett, who successfully eluded them.

=== Aftermath and honors ===
In Staunton, the legislature elected Thomas Nelson as the next governor. Jefferson's term had expired on June 2.

Recognizing its debt to Jouett, the legislature passed a resolution on June 15 to honor him. The legislature resolved to give Jouett a pair of pistols and a sword in gratitude. Jouett received the pistols in 1783, but the sword was re-ordered in 1804, and no documentation indicates Jouett actually received it.

== Kentucky career ==
In 1782, Jouett moved across the Appalachian Mountains to Kentucky County, where veterans received land claims for their service. A family story claims that, on his journey to Kentucky, Jouett heard a woman's screams coming from a house. He burst into the house and found a wife being abused by her husband. He attempted to help by knocking down the husband, only to have the wife hit him over the head with a pot. The pot's bottom gave out, and the pot became stuck around Jouett's neck. Jouett fled the scene and traveled 35 miles (56 km) before he found a blacksmith to remove the pot.

Jouett was among the ten men who founded the town of New Market at the confluence of the Dick's and Kentucky Rivers. Shortly after Jouett moved to Kentucky, the large county was divided into Lincoln, Jefferson and Mercer Counties. Lincoln County voters elected Jouett as their representative in the Virginia House of Delegates (alongside Benjamin Logan). Jouett served one term from Lincoln County (October 16, 1786 – January 11, 1787) before Mercer County's creation, then one term from Mercer County (alongside William MacDowell from October 15, 1787 – January 8, 1788) before local voters replaced both by Samuel Taylor and Alexander Robinson. Jouett again won election to the Virginia House of Delegates from Mercer County in 1790, this time serving alongside Anthony Crockett from October 18 – December 29, before voters replaced both delegates with Samuel Taylor and Jacob Fromm.

Jouett favored Kentucky's statehood at the Separation Convention held in Danville, Kentucky in 1788, in which he and Thomas Allin were Mercer County's two delegates. After statehood, Jouett served in the Kentucky House of Representatives, first representing Mercer County, then Woodford County. His friends reportedly included both Democrat Andrew Jackson and his Whig rival Henry Clay.

Politics being a part-time occupation, Jouett also farmed using enslaved labor. In 1820, he owned 23 slaves. In addition to grain, Jouett raised and bred livestock, including importing some from England. As discussed below, he married into a locally prominent family in 1784. A few years later, Jouett moved his family to Woodford County. He built a house there in 1797 (which still exists), but would later return to Mercer County in the same general region. This house was built in the style of the traditional hall and parlor plan, and was erected during the mid-Federal period, five years after Kentucky statehood, and features five rooms—three downstairs and two half-story bedrooms upstairs. When they left Woodford County is not recorded; Jouett later moved to Bath County to live with his daughter and her family.

== Personal life ==
Jouett married Sallie Robards in Mercer County, Kentucky in 1784. Together they had 12 children, including Matthew Harris Jouett, who trained as a lawyer at his father's insistence, but became possibly Kentucky's best-known portrait painter of the era, although that career choice caused his father dismay. Reportedly Jouett said, "I sent Matthew to college to make a gentleman of him, and he has turned out to be nothing but a damned sign painter." Matthew Jouett had attended Transylvania University and read law with George M. Bibb, and his father approved his enlisting in the 3rd Mountain Regiment of the Kentucky Volunteers during the War of 1812. The regiment's payroll was lost during the Battle of the River Raisin and it is said Matthew became a portrait painter to earn the money back. He settled in Lexington to paint portraits and miniatures. Matthew Jouett also studied with Gilbert Stuart in Boston, but he spent winters in New Orleans, Natchez and other cities, and was buried in the family burying ground of his father-in-law, William Allen. Jouett had another notable martial descendant through Matthew, his grandson James Edward "Fighting Jim" Jouett, who began his naval career as a midshipman in 1841. He served under Admiral Farragut, including in the Union Navy during the American Civil War, rose to the rank of Rear Admiral, ultimately retired to Sandy Spring, Maryland and is buried at Arlington National Cemetery. He was immortalized in Farragut's famous quote "Damn the torpedoes! Four bells! Captain Drayton go ahead! Jouett full speed!" Other sons were Thomas Jefferson Jouett (1801–1867) who married Mary Daniel in 1822, who bore Edward S. Jouett Sr. (1851–1890), and John Jouett III (1793–1876) who married Amy Elisabeth Beverly Brown and whose daughter Mary (1829–1912) married Benjamin Daniel Lacy in 1861.

In total, Jack and Sally had 12 children who were known as:

- George Payne: born June 1785, died Sep 1811.
- Catherine: born January 8, 1787, died December 23, 1790.
- Matthew Harris: (1788–1827) married May 25, 1812, in Fayette Co KY to Margaret Henderson (Allen) Jouett.
- Elizabeth Lewis: (1790 – April 23, 1848) married August 14, 1817/Bath Co KY to William Dabney Haden: born March 9, 1790/VA, died May 12, 1834/KY, s/o Anthony Haden & Ann Harris.
- Polly Allin: (1792–1879) married July 19, 1815, to Edward Stockton.
- John "Jack" III: (1793–1876) married to Amy Eliza Beverly Brown (1803–1851).
- William Robards: (1795–1852) married 1. Sarah A. Chesley, m2. Sarah Strother Taylor: (1814–1888).
- Landon Carter: born April 1797, died August 5, 1828.
- Robert: born January 6, 1799, died October 20, 1816.
- Thomas Jefferson: born January 14, 1801, died 1867, married November 19, 1829, to Mary 'Polly' Daniel.
- Virginia: born June 21, 1803, died June 16, 1822/Mt Sterling KY
- Lynch: (1805–1856).

== Death and legacy ==
Jack Jouett died March 1, 1822, at his daughter's house near Owingsville in Bath County, Kentucky. He is buried in Bath County at the "Peeled Oak" farm in an unmarked grave. The site of the grave was lost until the twentieth century. Jack Jouett's farm he called "Woodford Farm" and was located on the Peeled Oak Pike. It was located on a knoll above the confluence of the Big & Little Slate Creeks, just off the Pike. Local Bath County historians such as John A. Richards have concluded that Jack did die while at his daughter's home (Elizabeth Haden or Polly Stockton) but he was buried at the Tanyard Graveyard, a place where many Revolutionary War Veterans of the area were known to have been laid to rest, two miles northeast of Jack's Woodford Farm.

In an attempt to promote Jouett's memory, the Charlottesville Daily Press published the following poem on October 26, 1909:

Hearken good people: awhile abide
And hear of stout Jack Jouetts ride;
How he rushed his steed, nor stopped nor stayed
Till he warned the people of Tarleton's raid.

The moment his warning note was rehearsed
The State Assembly was quickly dispersed.
In their haste to escape, they did not stop
Until they had crossed the mountain top.
And upon the other side come down.
To resume their sessions in Staunton Town.

His parting steed he spurred,
In haste to carry the warning
To that greatest statesman of any age,
The Immortal Monticello Sage.

Here goes to thee, Jack Jouett!
Lord keep thy memory green;
You made the greatest ride, sir,
That ever yet was seen.

Virginia has named two schools for Jack Jouett: Jouett Elementary School in Louisa County, Virginia and Jack Jouett Middle School in Albemarle County (the latter of which has since been renamed Journey Middle School). Some contend that his ride was far more important than that of Paul Revere, however, Revere's ride had the benefit of Henry Wadsworth Longfellow's poem Paul Revere's Ride to enshrine it in the American consciousness. The Three Notch'd Brewing Company in Charlottesville named their flagship India Pale Ale "40-mile" to honor Jouett's ride. Southern Revere Cellars (a Farm Brewery & Winery located along Jack Jouett Road in Louisa County, VA) based their namesake on Jack Jouett (AKA The Paul Revere of the South) and it is thought his path crossed by the property.
