= Belknap-class cruiser =

US guided missile cruiser class

Coordinates: 38.0812°N 122.0885°W

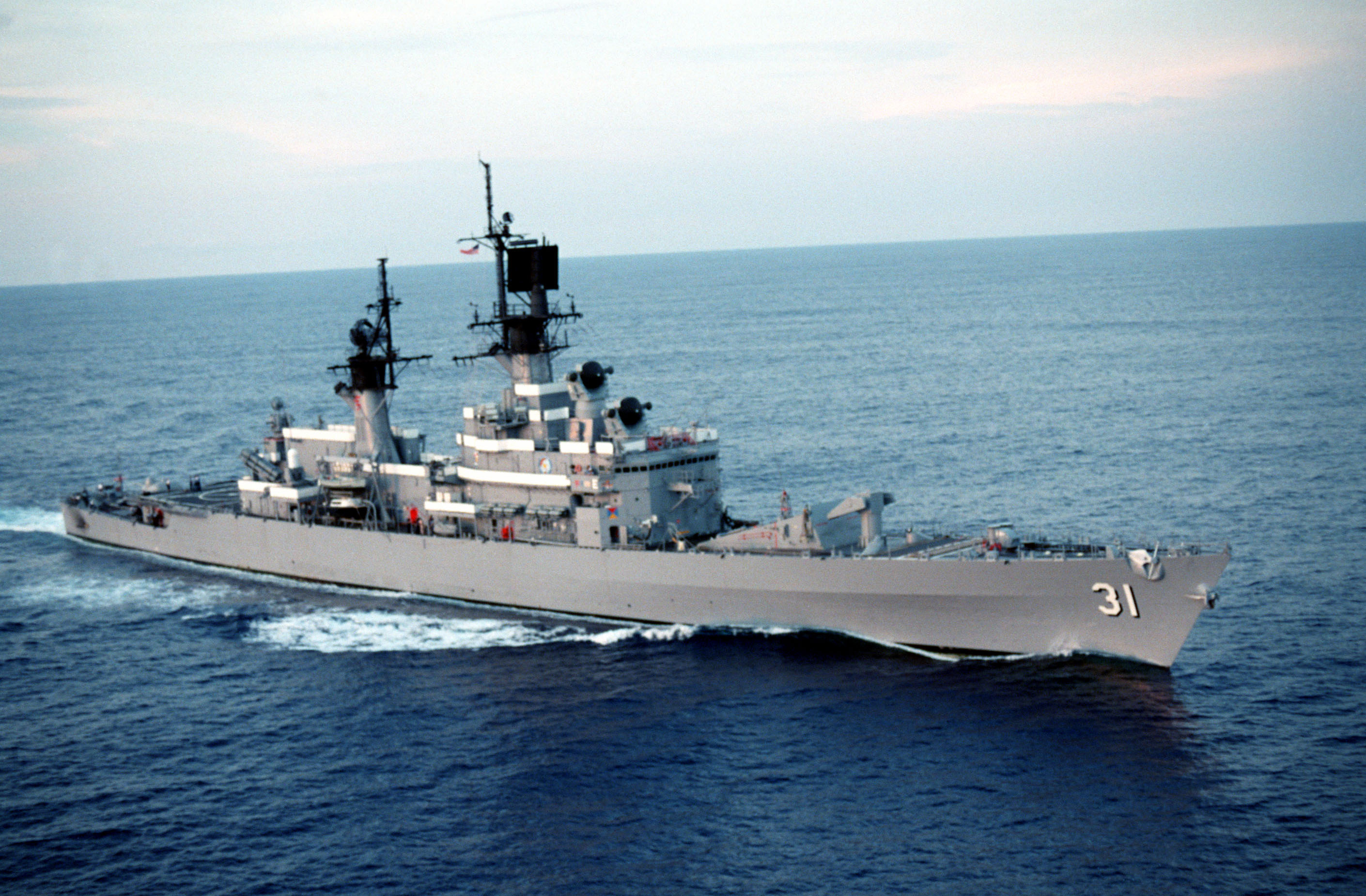
- USS Sterett on 7 September 1990

Class overview
- Name: Belknap class
- Builders: Bath Iron Works, ME (5); Puget Sound Naval Shipyard, WA (2); Todd Shipyards, San Pedro, CA (1); New York Shipbuilding, NJ (1)
- Operators: United States Navy
- Preceded by: Leahy class
- Succeeded by: California class
- Subclasses: Truxtun class
- Built: 1962–1967
- In commission: 1964–1995
- Completed: 9
- Active: 0
- Retired: 9

General characteristics
- Type: Guided missile cruiser
- Displacement: 7,930 tons (8,057 metric tons)
- Length: 547 ft (167 m)
- Beam: 55 ft (17 m)
- Draft: 29 ft (8.8 m)
- Propulsion: four 1200 psi (8300 kPa) boilers, two geared steam turbines, two shafts. 85,000 shp (63,384 kW)
- Speed: 32 knots (59 km/h)
- Complement: 27 officers, 450 enlisted
- Sensors & processing systems: AN/SPS-10 surface search RADAR; AN/SPS-48 3D air search radar; AN/SPS-49 2D air search radar; 2 AN/SPG-55 Terrier missile fire control radar; AN/SQS-26 SONAR
- Armament: (final configuration); 1 × Mk 10 Mod 7 Guided Missile Launching System with 40 SM-2ER Standard missiles; 20 × RUR-5 ASROC Antisubmarine Missiles (Fired from the Mk 10 launcher); 2 × 4 Harpoon missile launchers; 2 × 3 Mark 46 torpedo launchers; 1 × 5 Inch/54-caliber Mk. 42 gun; 2 × Phalanx CIWS
- Armor: none
- Aircraft carried: (final configuration) 1 × SH-2H Seasprite

The Belknap-class cruiser was a class of guided-missile cruisers built for the United States Navy during the 1960s. They were single-ended, meaning their missile armament was installed only forward, unlike "double-ended" missile cruisers with missile armament installed both forward and aft. The Belknaps were originally designated as DLG frigates (destroyer leaders; the USN use of the term frigate from 1950 to 1975 was intended to evoke the power of the sailing frigates of old), but in the 1975 fleet realignment, they were reclassified as guided missile cruisers (CG).

== Description ==
When commissioned, the main armament of the Belknap class was a 5-inch/54-caliber Mk. 42 gun on the quarterdeck and a twin-rail RIM-2 Terrier Mk 10 Mod 7 Guided Missile Launching System on the foredeck. The Mk 10 Mod 7 launchers in this class were modified compared to the others of the same type, with additional 20 missiles and the capability to launch RUR-5 ASROC to eliminate need for a separate Mk 112 ASROC launcher. These were unofficially spoken of as Ter/AS (tear-ass) launchers. The class was also equipped with two single 3"/50 caliber guns for defence against sub-sonic aircraft. In the early 1980s, the Terrier missiles were replaced with RIM-67 Standard missiles; and during the NTU program in the late 1980s and early 1990s the class had its Standard SM-1 system upgraded to utilize SM-2ER Block II, the 3-inch guns were replaced with two 4 cell Harpoon surface-to-surface missile launchers, and two Phalanx CIWS systems were installed.

The derivative USS Truxtun shared the weapons systems outfit of the Belknap class, but was nuclear-powered, larger and substantially unrelated in design (for example, many weapons systems in different locations, such as the aft-facing Mark 10 Mod 8 GMLS). Most information related to nuclear cruisers is still classified, but Truxtun appears to be more a Belknap-like derivative of the nuclear cruiser Bainbridge than the other way around.

== Ships in class ==
Name	Pennant	Builder	Laid Down	Launched	Commissioned	Decommissioned	Fate
Belknap-class conventional cruiser
Belknap	CG-26	Bath Iron Works, Bath	5 February 1962	20 July 1963	7 November 1964	15 February 1995	Sunk as target, 24 September 1998
Josephus Daniels	CG-27	Bath Iron Works, Bath	23 April 1962	2 December 1963	8 May 1965	21 January 1994	Broken up at Brownsville, 1999
Wainwright	CG-28	Bath Iron Works, Bath	2 July 1962	25 April 1965	8 January 1966	15 November 1993	Sunk as target, 12 June 2002
Jouett	CG-29	Puget Sound Naval Shipyard, Bremerton	25 September 1962	30 June 1964	3 December 1966	28 January 1994	Sunk as target, 10 August 2007
Horne	CG-30	San Francisco Naval Shipyard, San Francisco	12 December 1962	30 October 1964	15 April 1967	4 February 1994	Sunk as target, 29 June 2008
Sterett	CG-31	Puget Sound Naval Shipyard, Bremerton	25 September 1962	30 June 1964	8 April 1967	24 March 1994	Broken up at Brownsville, 2005
William H. Standley	CG-32	Bath Iron Works, Bath	29 July 1963	19 December 1964	9 July 1966	11 February 1994	Sunk as target, 25 June 2005
Fox	CG-33	Todd Shipyard, San Pedro	15 January 1963	21 November 1964	8 May 1966	15 April 1994	Broken up at Brownsville, 2008
Biddle	CG-34	Bath Iron Works, Bath	9 December 1963	2 July 1965	21 January 1967	30 November 1993	Broken up at Philadelphia, 2001
Truxtun-class nuclear-powered cruiser
Truxtun	CGN-35	New York Shipbuilding Corporation, Camden	17 June 1963	19 December 1964	27 May 1967	11 September 1995	Disposed of through Ship-Submarine Recycling Program at Bremerton, 1999

== See also ==
- List of cruisers of the United States Navy
- List of United States Navy destroyer leaders
- Nuclear powered cruisers of the United States Navy

== Bibliography ==
- Bellars, Robert A. (2007). "Question 41/88?: U.S. Naval Relics". Warship International. XLIV (2): 157–158. ISSN 0043-0374.
