= AN/SPS-48 =

US Navy 3D anti-aircraft radar

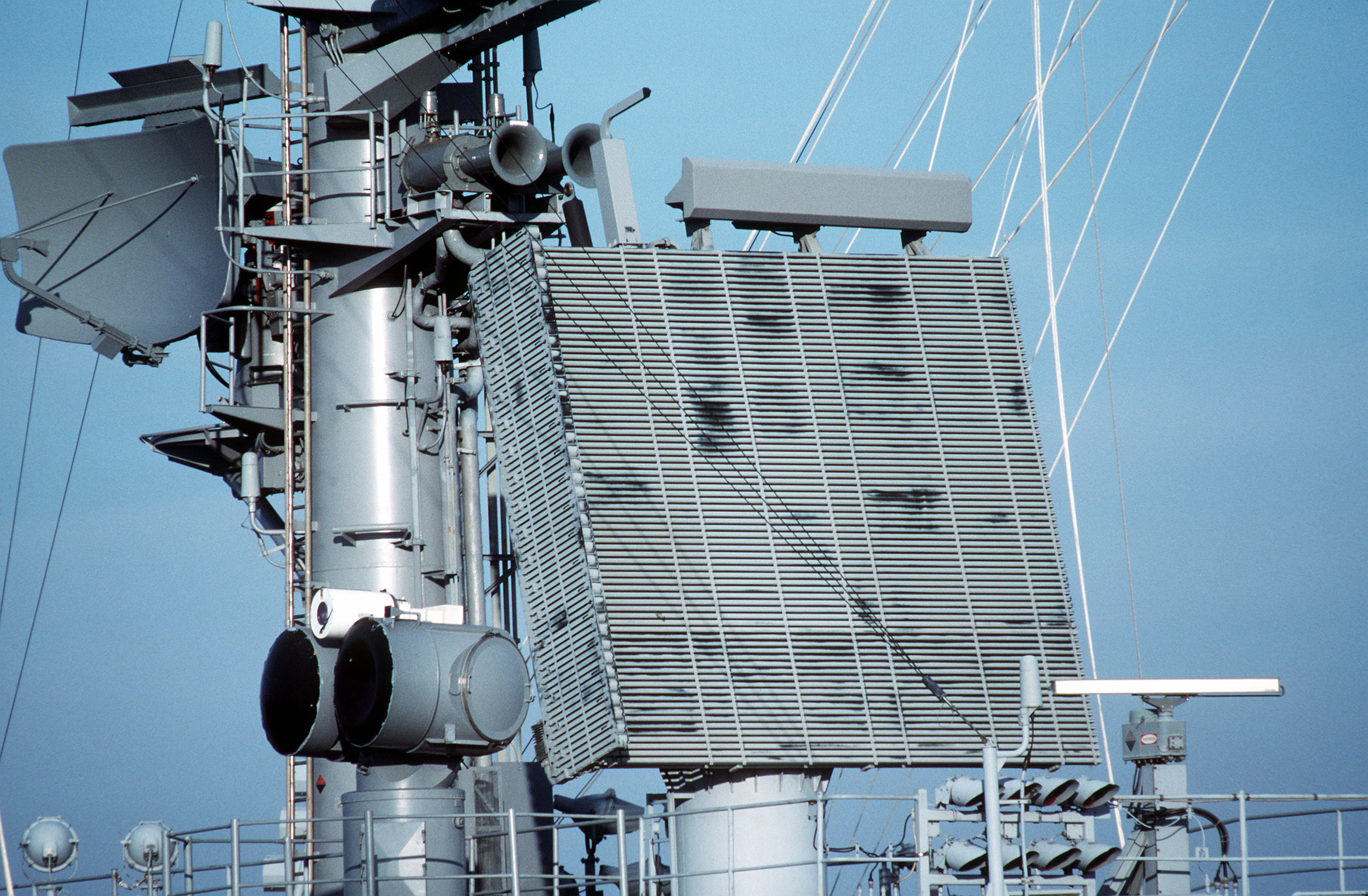
- AN/SPS-48E large square radar antenna aboard USS Theodore Roosevelt (CVN-71).
- Country of origin: United States
- Manufacturer: L3Harris Technologies
- Introduced: 21 February 1966; 59 years ago
- Type: 3D air-search
- Frequency: 2–4 GHz (15.0–7.5 cm); S-band
- RPM: 7.5 or 15 rpm
- Range: 250 nautical miles (290 mi; 460 km)
- Altitude: 100,000 feet (30,000 m)
- Diameter: 17 feet (5.2 m) by 17 feet 6 inches (5.33 m)
- Azimuth: 0-360°
- Elevation: 0-65°
- Precision: 690 feet (210 m) elevation 1/6° azimuth
- Power: 35 kW average

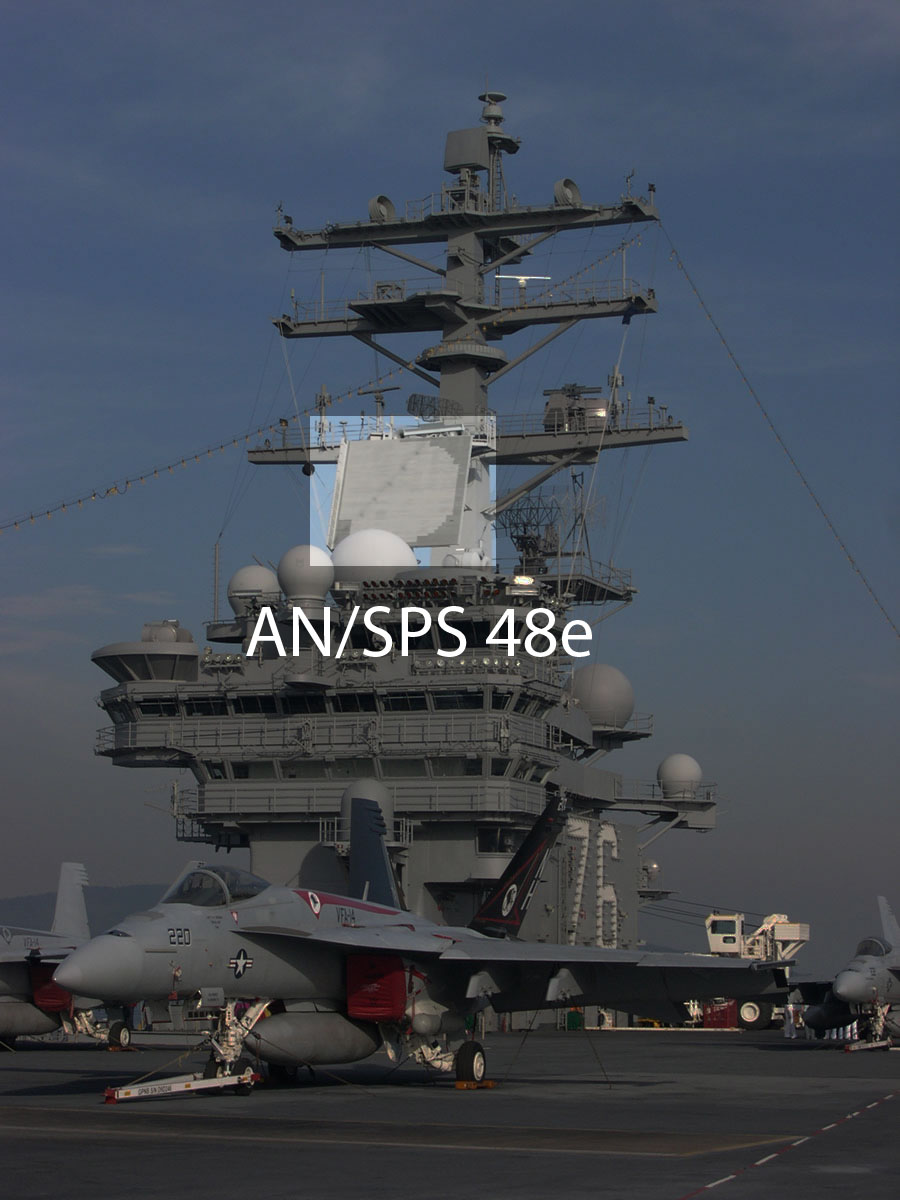
AN/SPS-48E aboard USS Ronald Reagan (CVN-76)

The AN/SPS-48 is a US naval electronically scanned array air search 3D radar system manufactured by L3Harris Technologies and deployed in the 1960s as the primary air search sensor for anti-aircraft warships. The deployment of the AN/SPY-1 and the end of the Cold War led to the decommissioning of many such ships, and many of these vessel's AN/SPS-48 sets were reused on aircraft carriers and amphibious ships where it is used to direct targets for air defense systems such as the Sea Sparrow and RIM-116 SAM missiles. Existing sets are being modernized under the ROAR program to AN/SPS-48G standard for better reliability and usability.

In accordance with the Joint Electronics Type Designation System (JETDS), the "AN/SPS-48" designation represents the 48th design of an Army-Navy electronic device for surface ship search radar system. The JETDS system also now is used to name all Department of Defense electronic systems.

== Operation ==
The 3D radar antenna is mounted on a base allowing for 360 degrees of rotation locating the target at a given azimuth. The range of the target is also identified based on the time it takes the radio frequency signal to travel out and back to the receiver. What makes this radar system different is its ability to detect the height of the target above the surface. With these three pieces of data the radar's central processor has the ability to determine the target location in an X/Y/Z, 3 dimensional space.

For the SPS-48 in particular, the antenna is mechanically rotated to scan azimuth, while beams are electronically steered to cover elevation by varying the transmitter frequency. The 4,500 pounds (2,000 kg) antenna is capable of rotating at 7.5 or 15 rpm.

The system has a range exceeding 250 nautical miles (290 mi; 460 km), tracking targets up to 69 degrees in elevation. The AN/SPS-48E is capable of providing target range, bearing and altitude information using a frequency-scanning antenna with a range of frequencies in S-band and having three power modes: high, medium and low. SPS-48 radars stack multiple beams in a train of pulses at different frequencies. The beams scan different elevation areas, allowing the stack to cover up to 69 degrees of elevation.

== History ==
The Naval Tactical Data System (NTDS) Technical and Operational Requirements, written in 1956, called for two radar systems: a three-dimensional search radar with a range of more than 200 miles that can turn over targets to missile and gun radars, and a two-dimensional long-range search radar able to detect relatively small targets at ranges over 250 miles, which can hand targets to the three-dimensional radar once they enter its range. The former eventually became the AN/SPS-48; the latter became the AN/SPS-49.

Development of the SPS-48 in particular started in 1960 in response to shortcomings of the AN/SPS-39. A development contract for two service models (XN-1 and XN-2) was awarded in June 1960. XN-1 completed system testing in April 1962 and was operated until December 1962 to collect reliability data ashore. XN-2 was delivered July 1962 and installed aboard USS Preble (DLG-15) for shipboard evaluation.

A production contract of 13 radars was awarded in June 1963. Unit #6 was installed on USS Worden (DLG-18) between March and June 1965 for reliability testing by the Operational Test and Evaluation Force. Testing results were positive, and the AN/SPS-48 was formally approved for service use by the Chief of Naval Operations on 21 February 1966. The AN/SPS-48 replaced AN/SPS-39 on the Belknap, Coontz and Leahy classes between 1967 and 1975 under the Guided Missile Frigate Anti-Air Warfare Modernization Program.

Moving Target Indicator (MTI) capability, needed to see targets in clutter and weather, was added to the SPS-48 radar system with the upgrade to the SPS-48A. This upgrade was first evaluated with the USS Biddle (DLG-34) in 1968.

The AN/SPS-48B is noted as being installed on the Nimitz class aircraft carriers prior to the USS Abraham Lincoln (CVN-72). The Spruance-class destroyer, known in development as the DX, was designed with accommodations for replacing the AN/SPS-40B radar with the AN/SPS-48B for the DXG variant. This variant eventually became the Kidd-class destroyer, though it is unclear if it received the SPS-48B variant in practice.

The AN/SPS-48C added Automatic Detection and Tracking to the AN/SPS-48 system. The first prototype with ADT capability was manufactured by Gilfillan for evaluation at Mare Island mid-1964. It contained a special-purpose "pipeline processor" that had large amounts of memory for scan-to-scan comparisons and to identify and save blips that seemed to persist near the same location. This processor also built clutter maps on each 360-degree scan and looked for changes in the map, which it saved as possible targets. These blips and clutter changes that may be possible targets were sent to the NTDS, which did further comparisons to determine which ones had motions characteristic of a ship or airplane. This system would go to sea for operational evaluation in 1967 and be incorporated into the Belknap-class cruisers by 1975.

The AN/SPS-48E was first introduced 1987. The component count was reduced compared to the -48C (126,000 versus 280,000) and Built-In Test (BIT) capabilities were added, reducing the MTBF and manpower requirements. Performance improvements included improved resistance to jamming and ECM, better detection of smaller targets and targets on the horizon, high-angle tracking, and the ability to accept and execute commands from external air defense or shipboard combat systems. It was included as part of the New Threat Upgrade.

The AN/SPS-48G program addresses problems of long-term obsolescence through a system redesign that improves the radar's reliability, maintainability, and supportability through technology improvements, open architecture (OA) design, and improved logistics processes while reducing lifecycle cost. It only affects the layout of the below-deck units. The plan is to back-fit the existing AN/SPS-48E population from 2011 through 2020, with the SPS-48G units. They will support fleet 3D air search requirements through 2050 and beyond for the ship classes that have SPS-48G. The earlier 1st and 2nd stage RF amplifiers are replaced with a solid state transmitter and the receiver, processor, and Auxiliary Detection Processor, formerly housed in individual equipment cabinets, are combined into a single cabinet. The number of Lowest Replaceable Units is reduced by 87%, and mean time between critical failure is improved over the AN/SPS-48E(V) by 104%. The new commercial off-the-shelf (COTS) radar processor's computing capabilities will be sustained through a planned tech-refresh program. More intuitive and interactive built-in-test and embedded maintenance and operator training makes available all radar technical, engineering, and logistics data and allows remote monitoring and distance support, while ensuring accurate and timely configuration management.

== Uses ==
With the air targets exact 3D location it is available for interception/removal via either the ship's weapon system or through linked weapons platforms located elsewhere. It is the predecessor of the AEGIS system currently in use on Arleigh Burke-class destroyers and Ticonderoga-class cruisers. The AEGIS AN/SPY-1B/D radars are electronically scanned phased arrays, while the SPS-48E is frequency scanned in elevation, and mounted on a rotating joint that spins the radar in azimuth. The AN/SPS-48 is carried by US Navy ships such as Nimitz-class aircraft carriers, Wasp-class amphibious assault ships, Tarawa-class amphibious assault ships and San Antonio-class amphibious transport docks.

== Variants ==
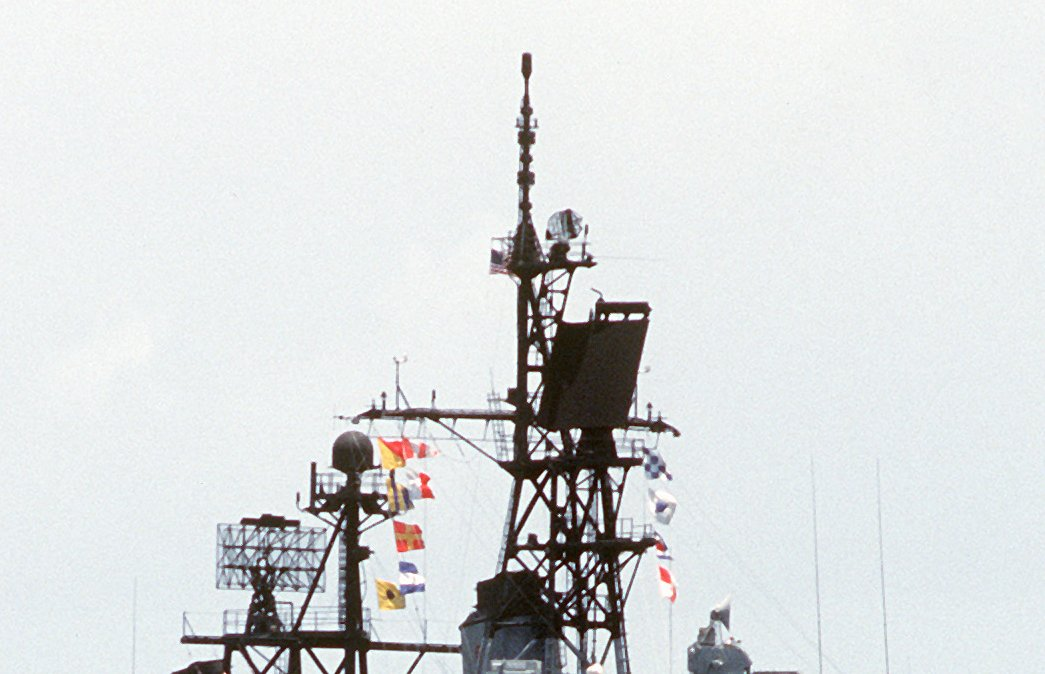
Masts of USS Macdonough (DDG-39) showing an SPS-48 radar near the center of the image

- AN/SPS-48A – Addition of Moving Target Indicator (MTI) to SPS-48
- AN/SPS-48C – 48A with Automatic detection and tracking capability as well as Moving target indicator (MTI) capability.
- AN/SPS-48D – Prototype version of -48E, tested on USS Mahan (DDG-42).
- AN/SPS-48E – Compared to the C variant, the SPS-48E has twice the radiated power, increased receiver sensitivity, four stage solid-state transmitter, half the components of a -48C and built-in testing for easier diagnostics. Originally developed as part of the New Threat Upgrade (NTU) Program to support the SM-2 Launch On Search (LOS) capability.
- AN/SPS-48E – Land based radar (LBR) version.
- AN/SPS-48G – Some new-build, others upgraded AN/SPS-48E under the Radar Obsolescence, Availability Recovery (ROAR) program. 29 radars are being modernized at a cost of $169.3 million under contract N00024-09-C-5395. Replacing below-decks units with modern electronics based on open architecture will reduce training demands and improve reliability.

== See also ==
- Diffraction grating
- Selex RAN-40L – Radar of similar function used in some aircraft carriers
- List of radars
- Similar US Naval radars
- List of military electronics of the United States
