= James Edward Jouett =

U.S. Navy officer (1826–1902)

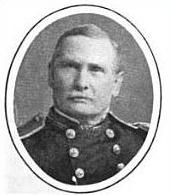
- Born: February 7, 1826 near Lexington, Kentucky
- Died: September 30, 1902 (aged 76); Sandy Spring, Maryland
- Burial place: Arlington National Cemetery
- Military career
- Allegiance: United States of America
- Branch: United States Navy; Union Navy
- Service years: 1841–1890
- Rank: Rear admiral
- Units: USS Metacomet; North Atlantic Squadron; 1889 Panama action
- Conflicts: Mexican–American War; American Civil War: Battle of Mobile Bay; Colombian Civil War: Panama Incident

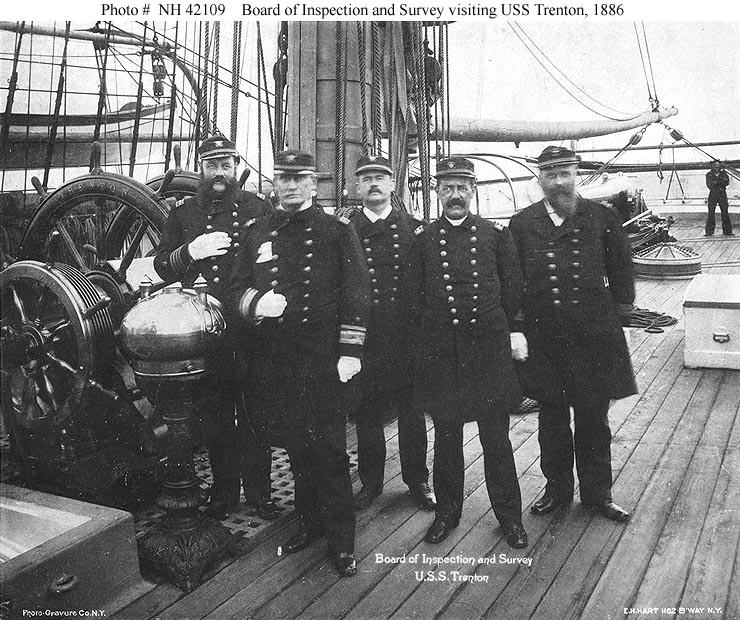
Jouett (second from left) as a member of the Naval Inspections Board on the screw steamer USS Trenton in 1886.

Rear Admiral James Edward Jouett (7 February 1826 – 30 September 1902), known as "Fighting Jim Jouett of the American Navy", was an officer in the United States Navy during the Mexican–American War and the American Civil War. His father was Matthew Harris Jouett, a notable painter, and his grandfather was Revolutionary War hero Jack Jouett.

== Biography ==
Born near Lexington, Kentucky, Jouett was appointed midshipman 10 September 1841. He served on the African coast on the Decatur with Matthew C. Perry and on the John Adams during the Mexican–American War.

== American Civil War ==
At the beginning of the Civil War, Jouett was captured by Confederates at Pensacola, Florida, but was soon paroled. He then joined the blockading forces off Galveston, Texas, distinguishing himself during the night of 7/8 November 1861 in the capture and destruction of Confederate schooner Royal Yacht, while serving on USS Santee. Jouett later commanded the Montgomery and R. R. Cuyler on blockading duty and in September 1863 took command of the Metacomet.

In the Battle of Mobile Bay, 5 August 1864, his ship, the Metacomet, was lashed to Admiral David Farragut's flagship Hartford as the ships entered the bay. Monitor Tecumseh was sunk by an underwater "torpedo", but the ships steamed on, possibly inspired by Farragut's reputed command: "Damn the torpedoes! Four bells! Captain Drayton go ahead! Jouett full speed!" Metacomet was sent after two Confederate gunboats, and in a short chase Jouett riddled the Gaines and captured the Selma.

== Post-Civil War and last years ==
Jouett had various commands ashore and afloat after the Civil War, taking command of the North Atlantic Squadron in 1884. In 1885 he commanded a naval force which forced the opening of the isthmus of Panama, threatened by insurrection.

== Shore duty ==
Admiral Jouett was named President of the Board of Inspection and Survey and served from June 1886 to February 1890.

== Retirement ==
Rear Admiral Jouett retired in 1890. A special act of Congress granted him full pay for the rest of his life as a reward for his brilliant service. He returned to his home "Stockwood" in Howard County, Maryland he lived most of his remaining years at "The Anchorage," Sandy Spring, Maryland. He was buried at Arlington National Cemetery section 1, site 85A.

== Honored in ship naming ==
Three ships in the United States Navy have been named USS Jouett in his honor.

Military offices
Preceded by Stephen B. Luce	Commander-in-Chief, North Atlantic Squadron; 20 September 1884 – June 1886	Succeeded by Stephen B. Luce
