= Standley =

Standley may refer to:

- Joseph E. Standley, founder of Ye Olde Curiosity Shop in Seattle, Washington, United States, in 1899
- Julia Standley, died during the 1974 Huntsville Prison Siege in the Texas State Penitentiary
- Paul Carpenter Standley (1884–1963), American botanist
- William Harrison Standley (1872–1963), U.S. admiral

== See also ==
- Admiral William Standley State Recreation Area, state recreation area of California, USA
- Standley Lake, 1,000-acre lake located in Westminster, Colorado
- Standley Lake High School, public secondary school in Westminster, Colorado, United States
- USS William H. Standley (CG-32), Belknap-class destroyer leader / cruiser
- Standee
- Standel
- Standen
- Stanley (disambiguation)
- Stanly (disambiguation)
