= Stanley =

Stanley may refer to:

== Arts and entertainment ==
=== Film and television ===
- Stanley (1972 film), an American horror film
- Stanley (1984 film), an Australian comedy
- Stanley (1999 film), an animated short
- Stanley (1956 TV series), an American situation comedy
- Stanley (2001 TV series), an American animated series

=== Other uses in arts and entertainment ===
- Stanley (play), by Pam Gems, 1996
- Stanley Award, an Australian Cartoonists' Association award
- Stanley: The Search for Dr. Livingston, a video game

== Businesses ==
- Stanley, Inc., an American information technology company
- Stanley Aviation, an American aerospace company
- Stanley Black & Decker, formerly The Stanley Works, an American hardware manufacturer
  - Stanley Hand Tools, a division of Stanley Black & Decker
- Stanley bottle, a brand of food and beverage containers
- Stanley Electric, a Japanese manufacturer of electric lights
- Stanley Furniture, an American furniture manufacturer
- The Stanley Hotel, Estes Park, Colorado, U.S.
- Stanley Hotel, Nairobi, Kenya
- Stanley Motor Carriage Company, an American manufacturer of steam cars
- Stanley Steemer, an American cleaning company
- Stanley Theater (disambiguation), several places

== People and fictional characters ==
- Stanley (name), a given name and family name, including a list of people and fictional characters
- Stanley (Brazilian footballer) (born 1985), born Stanley Richieri Afonso, Brazilian footballer

== Places ==
=== Australia ===
- Stanley, Tasmania
- Stanley, Victoria
- County of Stanley, Queensland
- Stanley River (Queensland)

=== Canada ===
- Stanley, British Columbia
- Rural Municipality of Stanley, Manitoba
- Rural Municipality of Stanley No. 215, Saskatchewan
- Stanley, New Brunswick
  - Stanley Parish, New Brunswick
- Stanley, Nova Scotia
- Stanley Peak (Ball Range), in the Canadian Rockies

=== New Zealand ===
- Stanley River (Canterbury)
- Stanley River (Tasman)

=== United Kingdom ===
- Stanley, Derbyshire, England
- Stanley, County Durham, England
- Stanley Crook, County Durham, England
- Stanley, Nottinghamshire, England
- Stanley, Staffordshire, England
- Stanley, West Yorkshire, England
- Stanley, Wiltshire, England
- Stanley, Perthshire, Scotland
- Stanley (ward), electoral ward in Kensington and Chelsea, London

=== United States ===
- Stanley, Idaho
- Stanley, Indiana
- Stanley, Iowa
- Stanley, Kansas
- Stanley, Kentucky
- Stanley, Louisiana
- Stanley, Minnesota
- Stanley, New Mexico
- Stanley, New York
- Stanley, North Carolina, the most populous place with the name
- Stanley, North Dakota
- Stanley, Oklahoma
- Stanley, Virginia
- Stanley, West Virginia
- Stanley, Wisconsin, in Chippewa County
- Stanley, Barron County, Wisconsin
- Stanley County, South Dakota
- Stanley Lake, in Custer County, Idaho
- Stanley Township, Lyon County, Minnesota
- Camp Stanley (Texas), U.S. Army installation in Texas
- Fox Chase Farm, in Philadelphia, Pennsylvania, listed on the NRHP as "Stanley", a former name

=== Other countries and territories ===
- Stanley (neighborhood), Alexandria, Egypt
- Stanley, Falkland Islands, capital city of the Falkland Islands
  - Stanley (constituency)
- Stanley, Hong Kong
- Camp Stanley, South Korea
- Mount Stanley, Democratic Republic of the Congo and Uganda
- Stanley Peak, South Georgia

== Sports ==
- Accrington Stanley F.C., English football club
- Stanley Cup, championship trophy of the National Hockey League in North America
- Stanley Football Association, former Australian rules football competition

== Transportation ==
- Stanley Airport, Nova Scotia, Canada
- Stanley (vehicle), an autonomous car created by Stanford Racing Team
- Stanley Steamer, an American automobile produced by the Stanley Motor Carriage Company
- Stanley (boat), an Icelandic fishing boat c. 1860
- PS Stanley (1864), a London and North Western Railway paddle steamer
- Stanley station (disambiguation), various railway stations

== Other uses ==
- Stanley Medical College, Madras, Tamil Nadu, India
- HMS Stanley, originally USS McCalla (DD-253), a Second World War destroyer transferred to the Royal Navy

== See also ==
- Stan Lee (disambiguation)
- Stanley Park (disambiguation)
- Stanly (disambiguation)
- Stanley v. Georgia, a U.S. Supreme Court decision
- Stanley v. Illinois, a U.S. Supreme Court decision
- Sten & Stanley, a Swedish dansband
