= Stanley Park (disambiguation) =

Stanley Park is a public park in Vancouver, British Columbia, Canada.

Stanley Park may also refer to:

== Arts and entertainment ==
- Stanley Park (novel), by Timothy Taylor, 2001
- Stanley Park (TV series), a 2010 drama pilot episode for BBC Three

== Places ==
=== Canada ===
- Stanley Park (neighbourhood), in Vancouver, British Columbia, Canada
- Parkhill/Stanley Park, Calgary, Alberta, Canada

=== United Kingdom ===
- Stanley Park, Blackpool, England
- Stanley Park, Liverpool, England
  - Stanley Park Stadium (proposed)
  - Stanley Park railway station (proposed)
- Stanley Park, in Selsley, Gloucestershire, England

=== United States ===
- Stanley Park (Westfield, Massachusetts)
