= Stanley station =

Stanley station or Stanley railway station may refer to:

- Stanley station (North Dakota), an Amtrak station in Stanley, North Dakota, United States
- Stanley railway station (Liverpool), a former railway station in Liverpool, England
- Stanley (West Yorkshire) railway station, a former railway station in Stanley, West Yorkshire, England
- Stanley (SMJR) railway station, a former railway station in Stanley, Perthshire, Scotland

== See also ==
- Stanley (disambiguation)
- Stanely railway station, a former railway station in Paisley, Renfrewshire, Scotland
- Stanley Park railway station, a proposed railway station in Liverpool, England
- Old Stanley Police Station, a former police station in Stanley, Hong Kong
- West Stanley railway station, a former railway station in Stanley, Durham, England
