= Embassy of the United States, Kuybyshev =

- Location: Kuybyshev (now Samara), Soviet Union
- Address: 62 Nekrasov Street
- Coordinates: 53.188461748224285°N 50.09886716503386°E
- Opened: 1941
- Closed: 1943
- Ambassador: Laurence Steinhardt, William Standley
- Jurisdiction: Soviet Union

The Embassy of the United States, Kuybyshev (Russian: Посольство США в Куйбышеве) was the former diplomatic representation of the United States in the Soviet Union located in the city of Kuybyshev (now Samara) during the years 1941–43. It was situated at 62 Nekrasov Street in an old building.

== Background ==
At the onset of evacuation, the US ambassador to the Soviet Union was Laurence Steinhardt. He traveled seven days by train to go some 400 miles east to Kuybyshev, leaving behind a skeleton staff in Moscow, including Llewellyn Thompson. Steinhardt was soon appointed to the US Ambassador to Turkey, and on February 14, 1942, Franklin D. Roosevelt appointed William Standley as the ambassador to the Soviet Union, a post he held into the autumn of 1943. A military mission with extraordinary powers was established at the embassy.
