= Stanley Peak =

Stanley Peak may refer to:

- Stanley Peak (Ball Range), in the Canadian Rockies
- Stanley Peak, South Georgia

== See also ==
- Mount Stanley, in Democratic Republic of the Congo and Uganda
