= Peale Island =

Minor islet of Wake Island

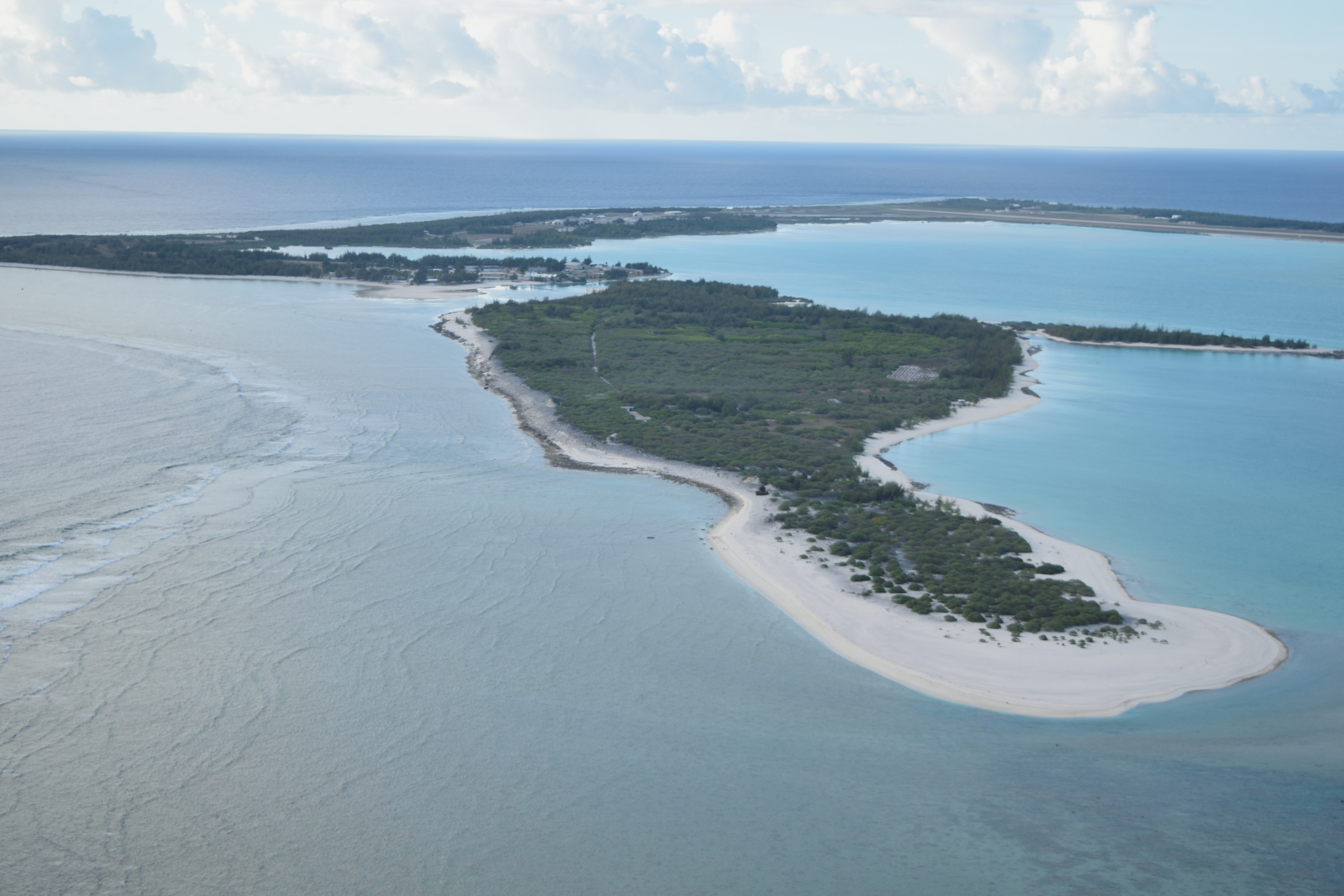
Looking east across Peale Island

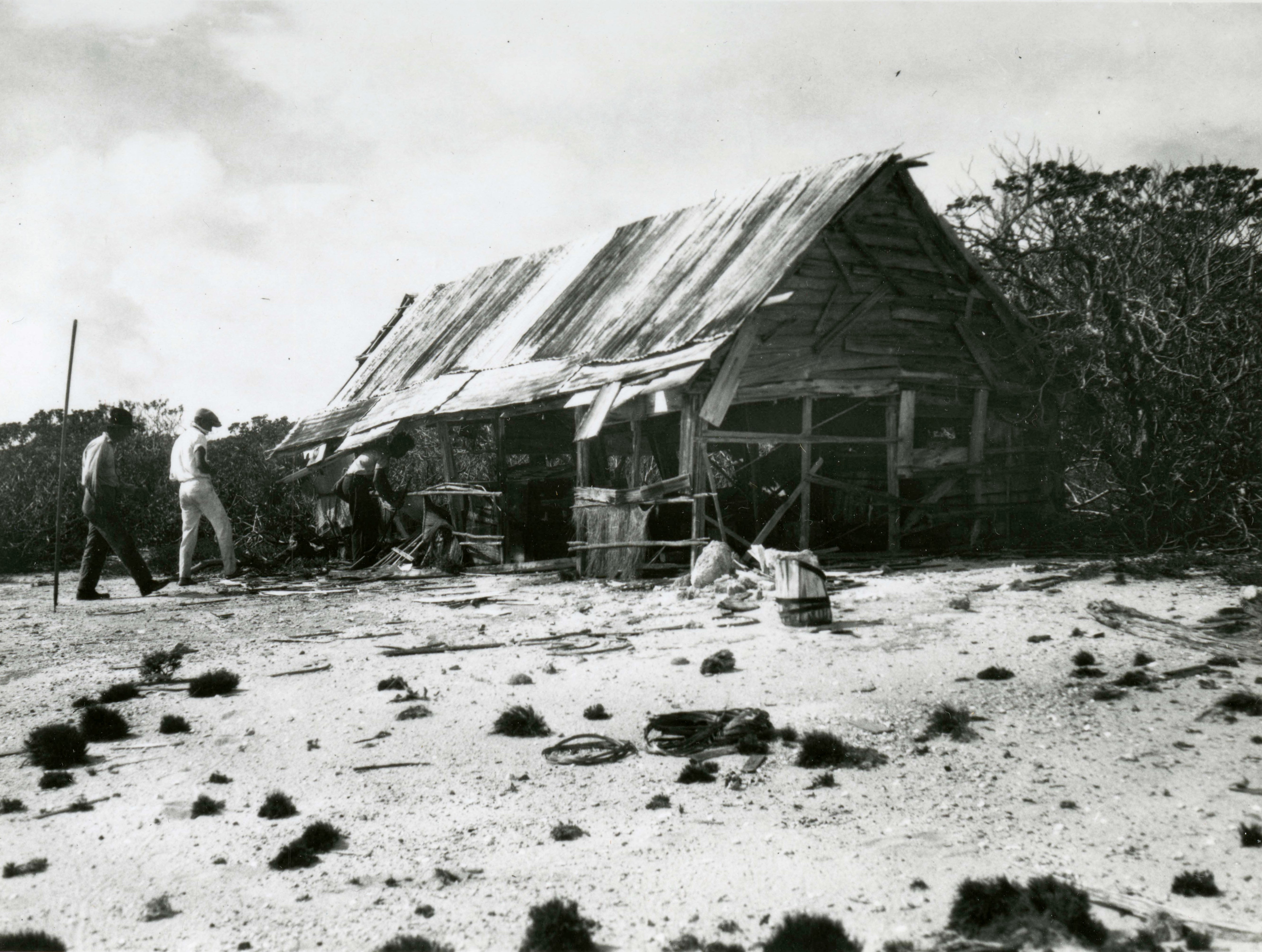
Bird hunter's shack on Peale Island, 1923

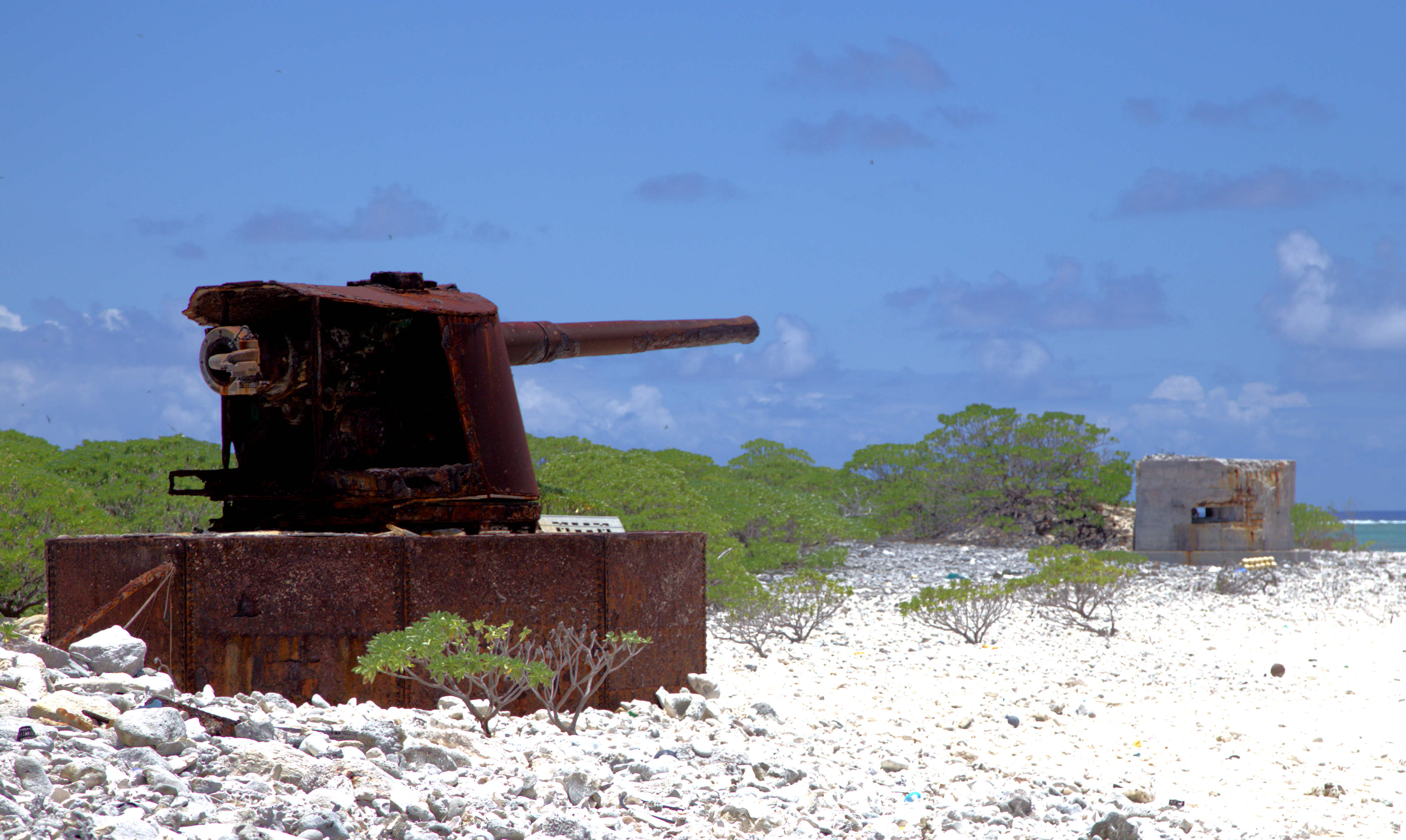
On the northern end of Peale Island, relics from World War II including an 8-inch naval gun and concrete pillbox

Peale Island is one of three islands in the Wake Island atoll, which lies in the Pacific Ocean between Guam and Midway. The atoll was, from 1935, the site of a seaplane base and a hotel built by Pan-American, who started the first transpacific passenger service using a string of islands across the Pacific to fly between America and Asia in stages. The island, like the rest of Wake, is made of coral fragments and sand, atop a seamount, and ringed by a living coral reef. The island is heavily forested with tropical scrub, trees, and grasses and is inhabited mainly by birds, rats, and hermit crabs. In the late 20th century, it was the site of a United States Coast Guard Loran Station, supporting radio navigation prior to satellite systems. The island is home to many historical items, including the Pan-American Hotel (a defunct airline) and remnants of World War II, such as bunkers and a rusted 8-inch coastal defense gun.

Peale Island is named for the naturalist Titian Peale, who visited the island in 1841. Peale Island was the site of some of the first hydroponically grown plants, which were used to provide fresh produce to the Pan-American hotel for the staff and passengers on layover. The western end of Peale Island is known as Toki point and another landmark is the remains of the seaplane pier into the lagoon.

== Geography ==
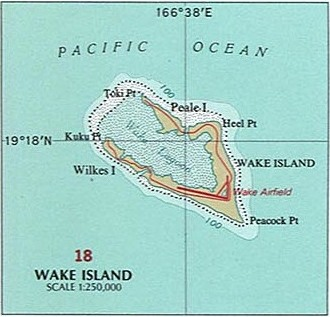
Location of Peale islet within Wake

Peale is on the north-west side of Wake Island, and major points on Peale include Toki Point, which is the western cape of Peale. On the southern side there is an extension of land into the lagoon that points south-east and ends at Flipper Point. It is separated from Wake Island by a channel which, from World War II to the 21st century, was crossed by a wooden bridge. The bridge had burned down by 2003.

In 1953 the bridge between Peale and Wake Island was rebuilt.

Wake is one of the most remote islands on the planet and is hundreds of miles from the nearest land. However, it conveniently sits in between other US Pacific islands such as Guam and the northern Marianas to the west and Midway, the western Hawaiian Islands, and Johnston Island to the east.

== Pan American Airways hotel and seaplane base (1935–1941) ==
Peale Islet of Wake was chosen as the site for the Pan-American hotel and flying boat facilities in the late 1930s, with a pier going out into the lagoon. When World War II started, the facilities were bombed, destroying the hotel. Pan Am remained in operation up to the day of the first Japanese air raid in December 1941, the airline had been operating a seaplane base and hotel since the mid-1930s. Construction started in 1935, and by 22 November 1935 mail service started, and with construction of a hotel passenger service started on 4 November 1936. There was no military constructions did not start until 1941.

=== Background ===
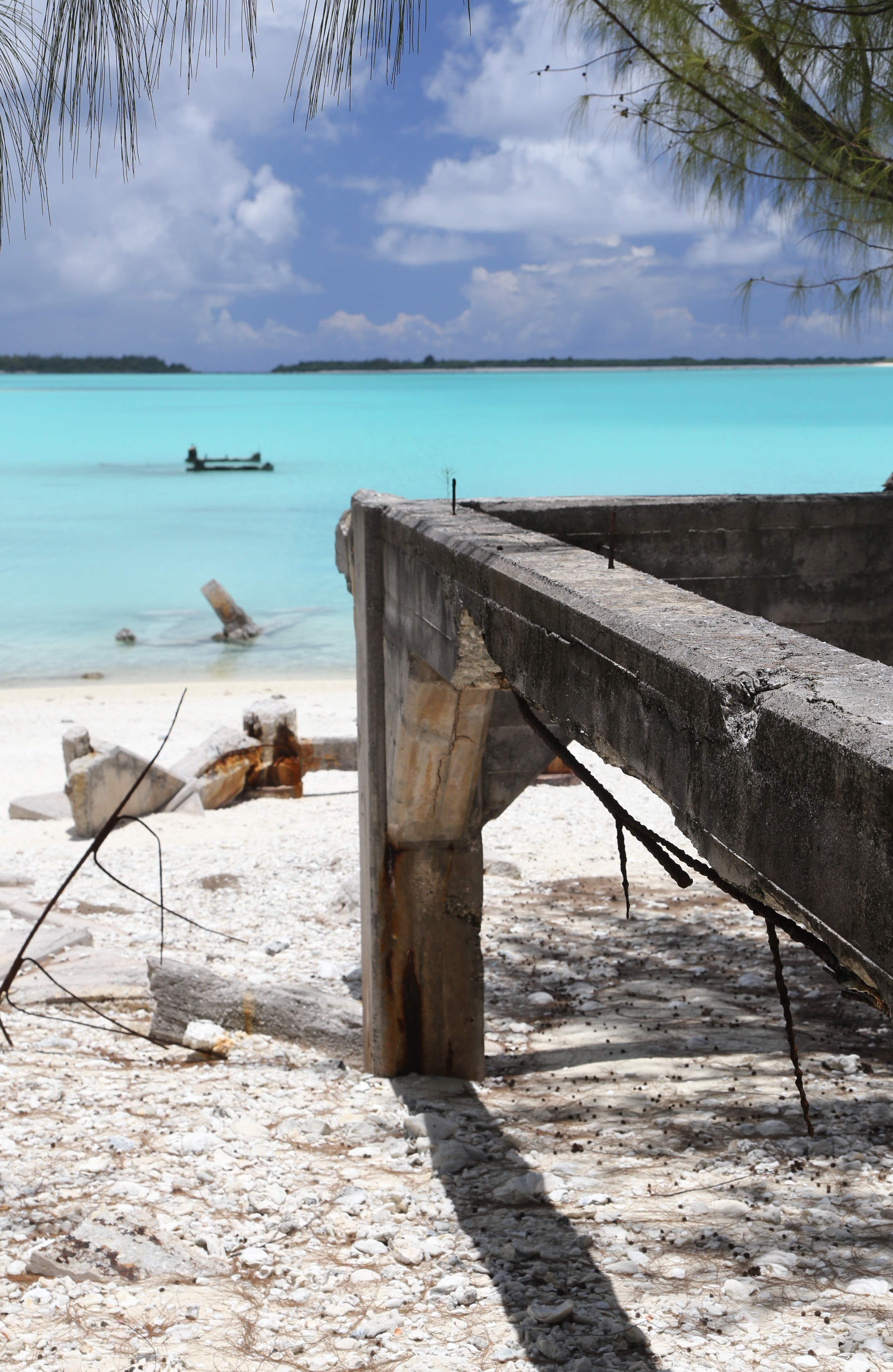
Remains of Pan-Am pier for the seaplane refueling station and airport on Peale Island

Juan Trippe, president of Pan Am, then the world's largest airline, wanted to expand globally by offering a service between the United States and China. To cross the Pacific Ocean, aircraft would need to stop at various points for refueling and maintenance. He first tried to plot the route on his globe, but it showed only open sea between Midway and Guam. He then went to the New York Public Library to study 19th-century clipper ship logbooks and charts, and he found Wake Island, a little-known coral atoll. To proceed with his plans at Wake and Midway, Trippe needed to be granted access to each island and approval to construct and operate facilities; however, the islands were not under the jurisdiction of any specific U.S. government entity.

Meanwhile, U.S. Navy military planners and the State Department were increasingly alarmed by the Empire of Japan's expansionist attitude and growing belligerence in the Western Pacific. Following World War I, the Council of the League of Nations had granted the South Seas Mandate ("Nanyo") to Japan (which had joined the Allied Powers in World War I) which included the already Japanese-held Micronesia islands north of the equator that were part of the former colony of German New Guinea of the German Empire; these include the modern nation/states of Palau, the Federated States of Micronesia, the Northern Mariana Islands and the Marshall Islands. In the 1920s and 1930s, Japan restricted access to its mandated territory and began to develop harbors and airfields throughout Micronesia in defiance of the Washington Naval Treaty of 1922, which prohibited both the United States and Japan from expanding military fortifications in the Pacific islands. Now with Trippe's planned Pan American Airways (PAA) aviation route passing through Wake and Midway, the U.S. Navy and the State Department saw an opportunity to project American air power across the Pacific under the guise of a commercial aviation enterprise. On October 3, 1934, Trippe wrote to the Secretary of the Navy, requesting a five-year lease on Wake Island with an option for four renewals. Given the potential military value of PAA's base development, on November 13, Chief of Naval Operations Admiral William H. Standley ordered a survey of Wake by USS Nitro and on December 29 President Franklin D. Roosevelt issued Executive Order 6935, which placed Wake Island and also Johnston, Sand Island at Midway and Kingman Reef under the control of the Department of the Navy. The navy did try to accommodate other interests, and Rear Admiral Harry E. Yarnell also designated Wake Island as a bird sanctuary.

=== Construction begins ===
USS Nitro arrived at Wake Island on March 8, 1935, and conducted a two-day ground, marine, and aerial survey, providing the navy with strategic observations and complete photographic coverage of the atoll. Four days later, on March 12, Secretary of the Navy Claude A. Swanson formally granted Pan American Airways permission to construct facilities at Wake Island.

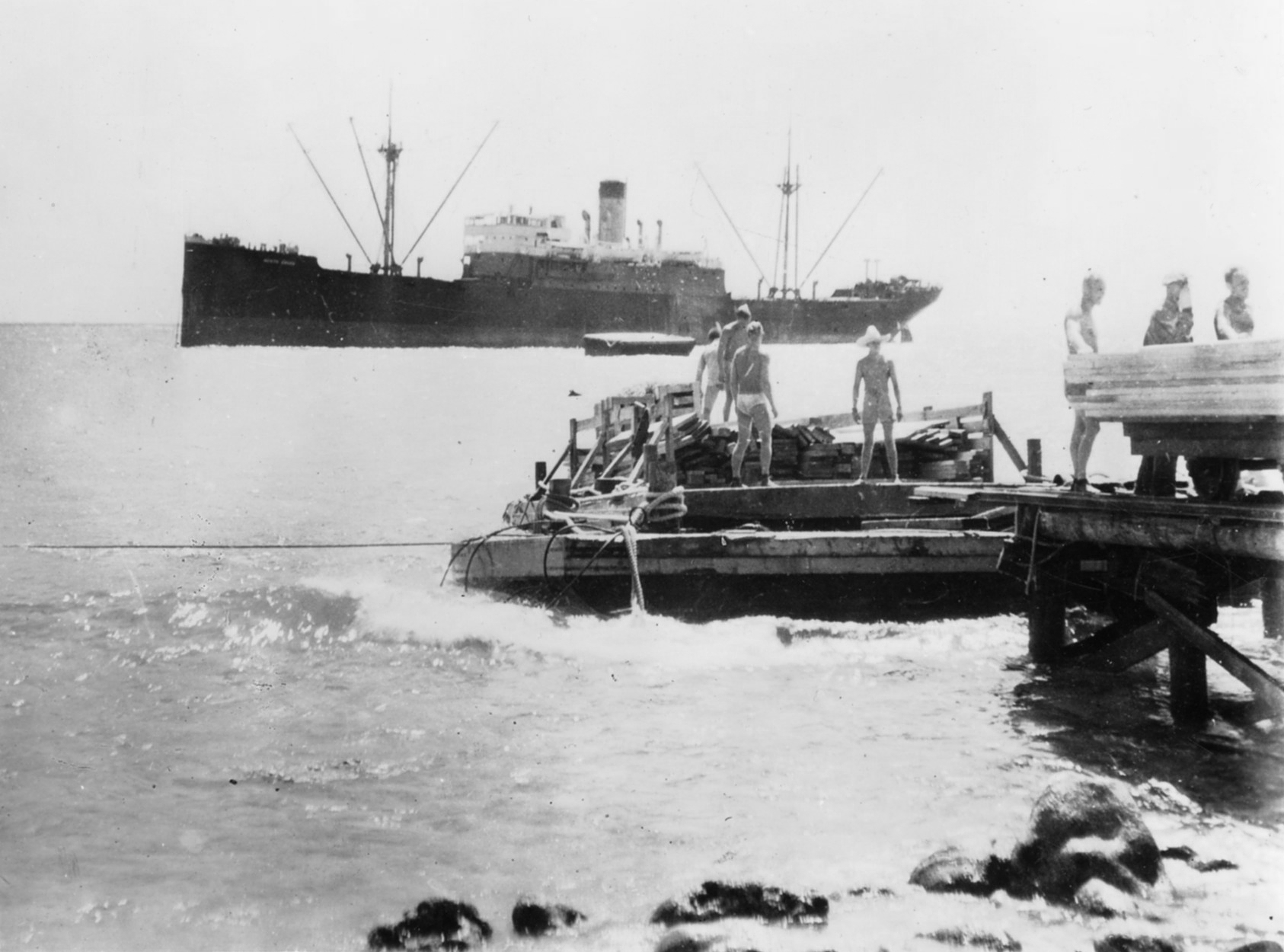
Pan American Airways (PAA) construction workers lighter building materials from SS North Haven to the dock at Wilkes Island, Wake Atoll

To construct bases in the Pacific, PAA chartered the 6,700-ton freighter SS North Haven, which arrived at Wake Island on May 9, 1935, with construction workers and the necessary materials and equipment to start to build Pan American facilities and to clear the lagoon for a flying boat landing area. The atoll's encircling coral reef prevented the ship from entering and anchoring in the shallow lagoon itself. The only suitable location for ferrying supplies and workers ashore was at nearby Wilkes Island; however, the chief engineer of the expedition, Charles R. Russell, determined that Wilkes was too low and at times flooded and that Peale Island was the best site for the Pan American facilities. To offload the ship, cargo was lightered from ship to shore, carried across Wilkes, and then transferred to a barge and towed across the lagoon to Peale Island. By inspiration, someone had earlier loaded railroad track rails onto North Haven, so the men built a narrow-gauge railway to make it easier to haul the supplies across Wilkes to the lagoon. The line used a flatbed car pulled by a tractor. On June 12, North Haven departed for Guam, leaving behind various PAA technicians and a construction crew.

Out in the middle of the lagoon, Bill Mullahey, a swimmer and free diver from Columbia University, was given the task of placing dynamite charges to blast hundreds of coral heads from a 1 mile (1,600 m) long, 300 yards (270 m) wide, 6 feet (2 m) deep landing area for the flying boats. In total, some 5 short tons (4.5 metric tons) of dynamite were used over three months on the coral heads in the Wake Atoll lagoon.

On August 17 the first aircraft landing at Wake Island occurred when a Pan-Am flying boat on a survey flight of the route between Midway and Wake landed in the lagoon. By November 1935, Pan-American started transpacific mail service.

The second expedition of North Haven arrived at Wake Island on February 5, 1936, to complete the construction of the facilities. A five-ton diesel locomotive for the Wilkes Island Railroad was offloaded and the railway track was extended to run from dock to dock. Across the lagoon on Peale workers assembled the hotel, which was a prefabricated structure with 48 rooms and wide porches and verandas. The hotel consisted of two wings built out from a central lobby, with each room having a bathroom with a hot-water shower. The staff included a group of Chamorro men from Guam who were employed as kitchen helpers, hotel service attendants and laborers. The village on Peale was nicknamed "PAAville" and was the first "permanent" human settlement on Wake.

North Haven brought two pre-fabricated 45 room hotels, one for Wake and another for Midway, in 1936. Pan-American originally started with mail service across the Pacific; however, the large demand for passenger service and interest in the islands led to accelerating plans for the passenger route. The hotel was designed for tropical conditions and consisted of a central lobby of a circular shape with two wings. The furnishings for the hotel were also shipped, and each room had a bath with a shower and hot water supply, a telephone for calls within the hotel and between rooms, and small items such as ashtrays and hangers for closets. The ship also brought gasoline, canned food, and other supplies for six months. Construction crews lived in tents, braving the difficult conditions with a sense of adventure.

=== Flights begin ===
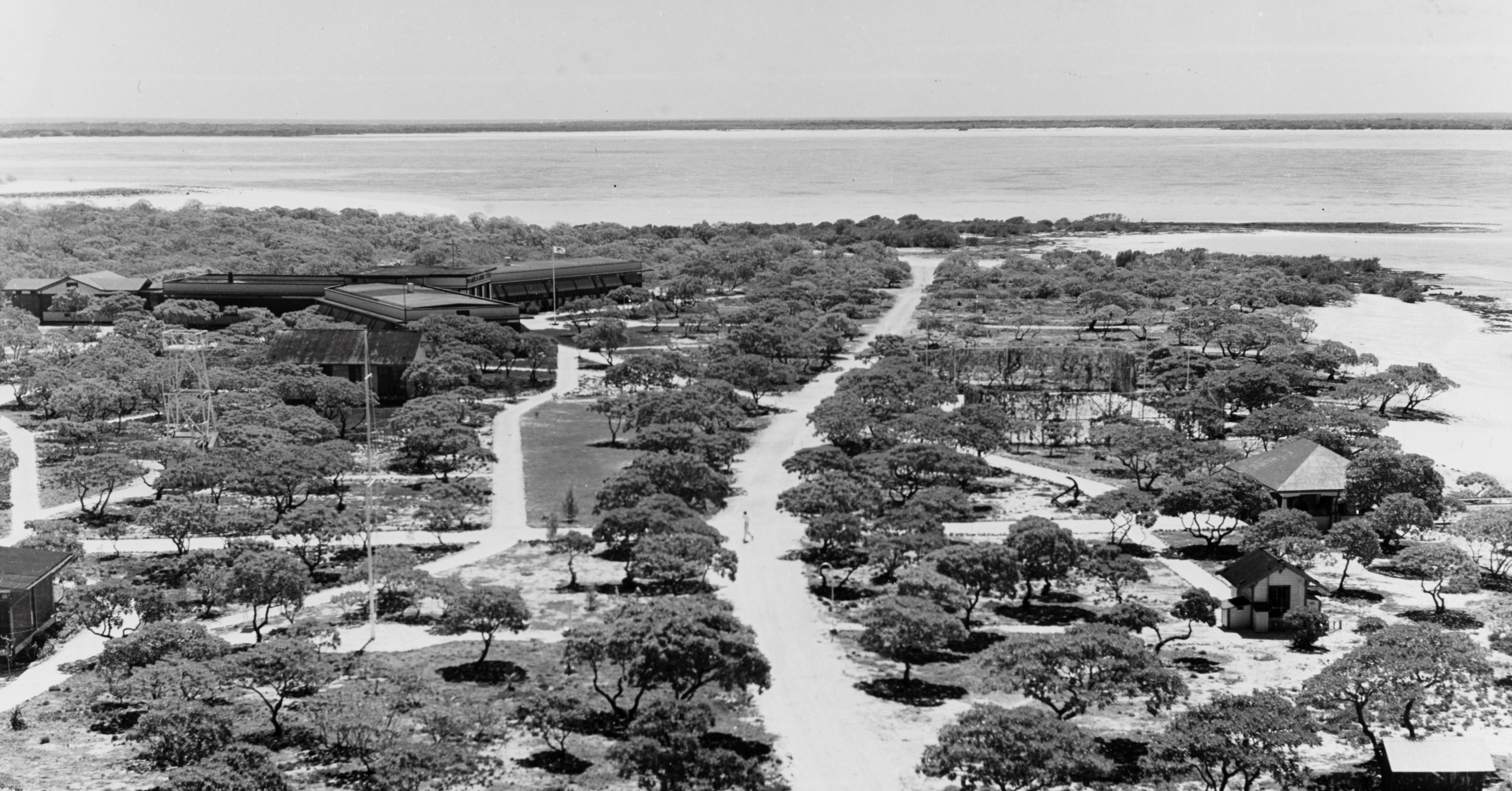
Aerial view of Pan American Airways Hotel and facilities on Peale Island at Wake Atoll in 1940. The hotel is on the left, the anchor from the Libelle shipwreck and the pergola leading to the "Clipper" seaplane dock is on the right.

By October 1936, Pan American Airways was ready to transport passengers across the Pacific on its small fleet of three Martin M-130 "Flying Clippers". On October 11, the China Clipper landed at Wake on a press flight with ten journalists on board. A week later, on October 18, PAA President Juan Trippe and a group of VIP passengers arrived at Wake on the Philippine Clipper (NC14715). On October 25, the Hawaii Clipper (NC14714) landed at Wake with the first paying airline passengers ever to cross the Pacific. In 1937, Wake Island became a regular stop for PAA's international trans-Pacific passenger and airmail service, with two scheduled flights per week, one westbound from Midway and one eastbound from Guam. Pan Am also flew Boeing 314 Clipper flying boats in addition to the Martin M130.

Wake Island is credited with being one of the early successes of hydroponics, which enabled Pan American Airways to grow vegetables for its passengers, as it was very expensive to airlift in fresh vegetables, and the island lacked natural soil. Dr. Gericke at University of California, Berkeley had written ground breaking research on hydroponics. After a conflict with the university over how they published his research, he left; however, some projects had already gotten underway. One of them was to have a Mr. Laumeister, a senior at the University of California, establish a hydroponic vegetable garden for the remote island, which had trouble getting fresh produce (a resupply ship came only once every six months). By 1938, he had grown radishes, and after overcoming some challenges, he managed to grow lettuce, cucumbers, and carrots. In June 1939, Torrey Lyons took over as head of the project and oversaw construction and use of a much larger hydroponicum to meet the demand. In contrast, Midway, which was another stop on the route, had to have thousands of tons of soil important to grow food and support a verdant landscape desired for a luxury stopover.

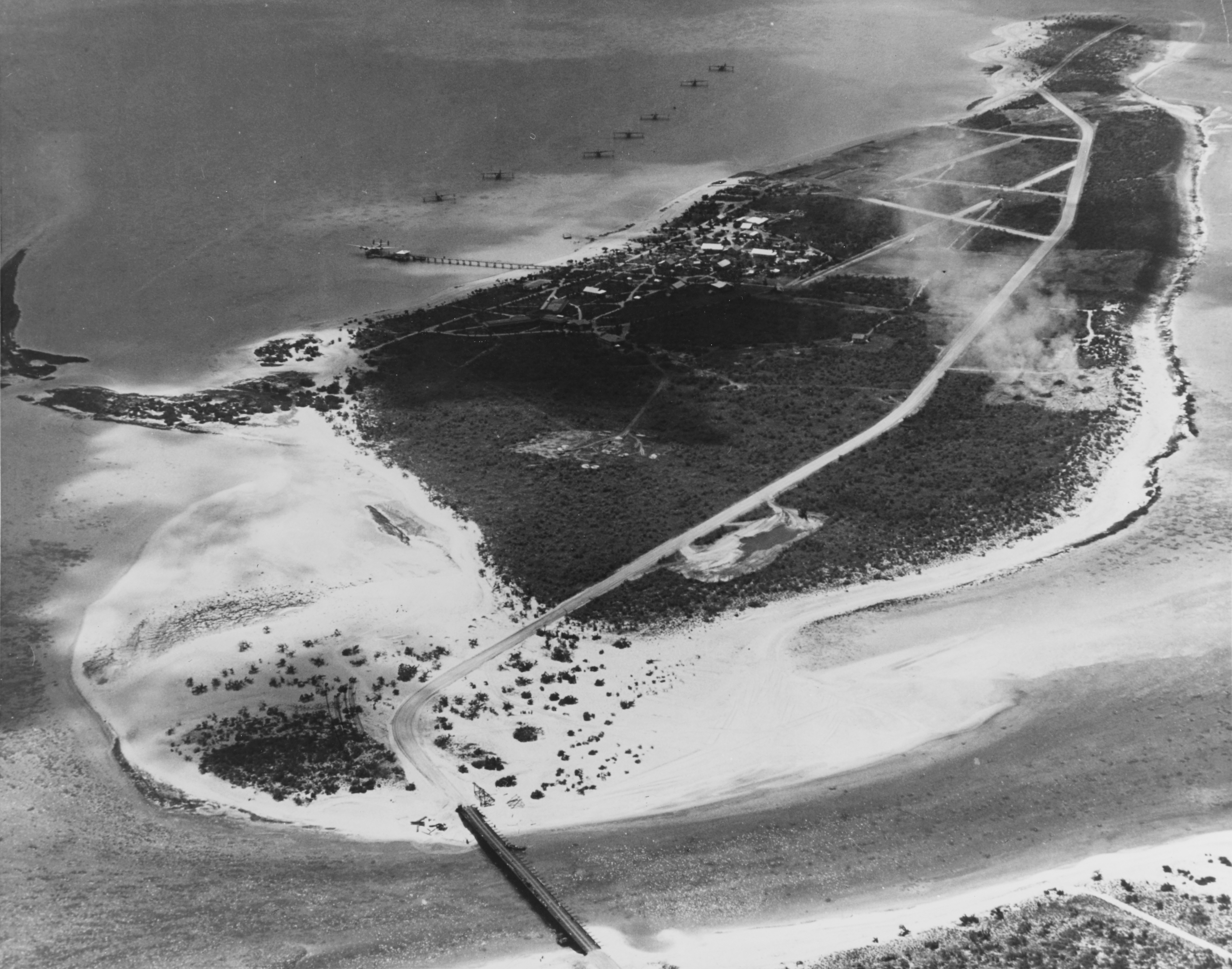
Peale islet in May 1941. The bridge leading to the rest of Wake crosses the channel, and some of the Pan American buildings and the lagoon pier are visible with seaplanes in the lagoon.

Starting in 1941, due to tensions in the Pacific, the U.S. began building a much larger military facility on Wake Island, including an air and submarine base, although it was not complete by the time hostilities started with Empire of Japan.

Pan Am remained in operation up to the day of the first Japanese air raid on Pearl Harbor in December 1941, forcing the U.S. into World War II. On 8 December 1942, the five-star hotel would be bombed along with the military airstrip, killing many employees and damaging facilities. However, the flying clipper received only minor damage in the lagoon, so it was flown out with the passengers and some of the Pan Am employees.

The last flight out was a Martin M-130 that had just taken off on a flight to Guam when it was called on the radio about Pearl Harbor and the outbreak of World War II, so it returned to Wake. It was fueled up and was going to do a maritime patrol to search for the Japanese when the Japanese bombing raid struck. The aircraft took some light damage during the raid, and two of the aircrew were wounded. It was stripped of seats and spare weight and filled with 40 people to evacuate. After three takeoff attempts, it got in the air and flew to Midway, then Pearl Harbor, then back to the US. Except for one other Marine who was flown out on the 21st, these were the last to leave Wake Island before the Japanese captured it. The plan had been to resupply with a naval force that was en route and withdraw civilian contractors that had been working on the military facilities; however, it was invaded on December 23 before this could happen.

=== World War II starts ===
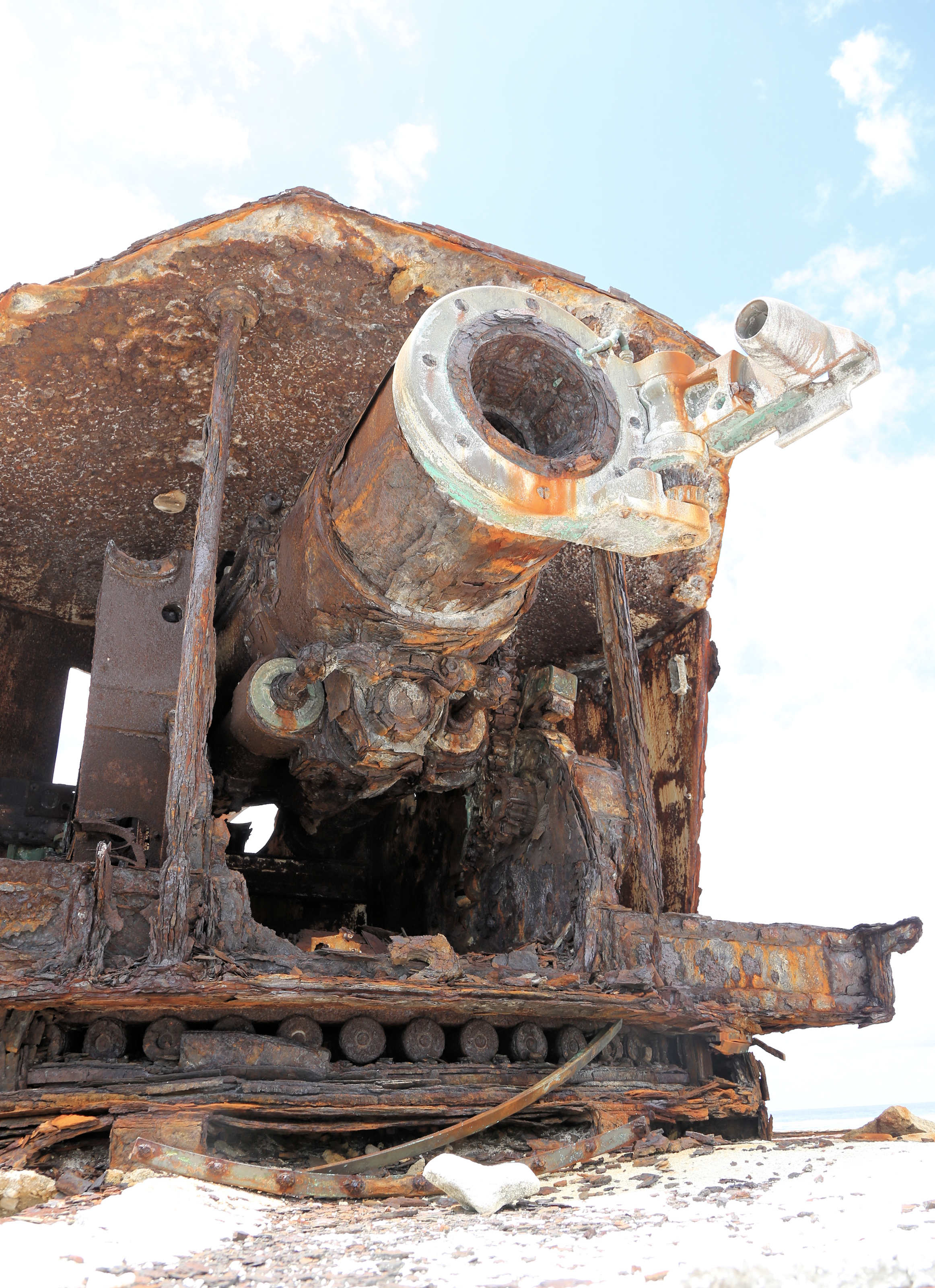
On the US National Register of historic places are some locations on Peale, including this coastal gun from World War II.

Early in the morning of December 8, 1941, a Pan-American Martin M-130 had left and was on its way to Guam with passengers when it received a radio message about the attack on Pearl Harbor and was told to return to Wake. It returned only to be caught in the Japanese surprise bombing raid, which killed 9 employees and destroyed many of the buildings.

Following this attack, the Pan Am employees were evacuated, along with the passengers of the Philippine Clipper, as the Martin 130 amphibious flying boat that had survived the attack unscathed save a few bullet holes. The surviving Chamorro workers did not board the plane and were left behind. Of the 45 Chamorros, five were killed and five wounded in the initial airstrikes on December 8, and the five in the hospital died the next day when the hospital was bombed. The military commander of Wake asked the surviving Chamorros if they would help defend the island; they agreed and helped fortify the island. They were taken as prisoners of war (POWs), with 33 surviving the war, and in 1982 they were granted veteran status for their contributions during the battle. The aircraft was stripped down to hold as many as possible, and about 40 passengers could fit, but they had to sit on the bare floor. The Philippine Clipper took three take-off attempts to get airborne and then flew to Midway, then Honolulu, and finally San Francisco over three days, and the passengers provided first-hand accounts of the attack. The passengers not only experienced the Wake air raid, but also had seen damage at Midway and Pearl Harbor on the way back to San Francisco. Midway was also attacked that day along with Wake and Pearl; it was shelled by two Japanese destroyers. Other US islands that were attacked in December include Johnston Atoll, Palmyra Atoll, Guam, and many locations in the Philippines. (see also Invasion of the Philippines)

== World War II ==
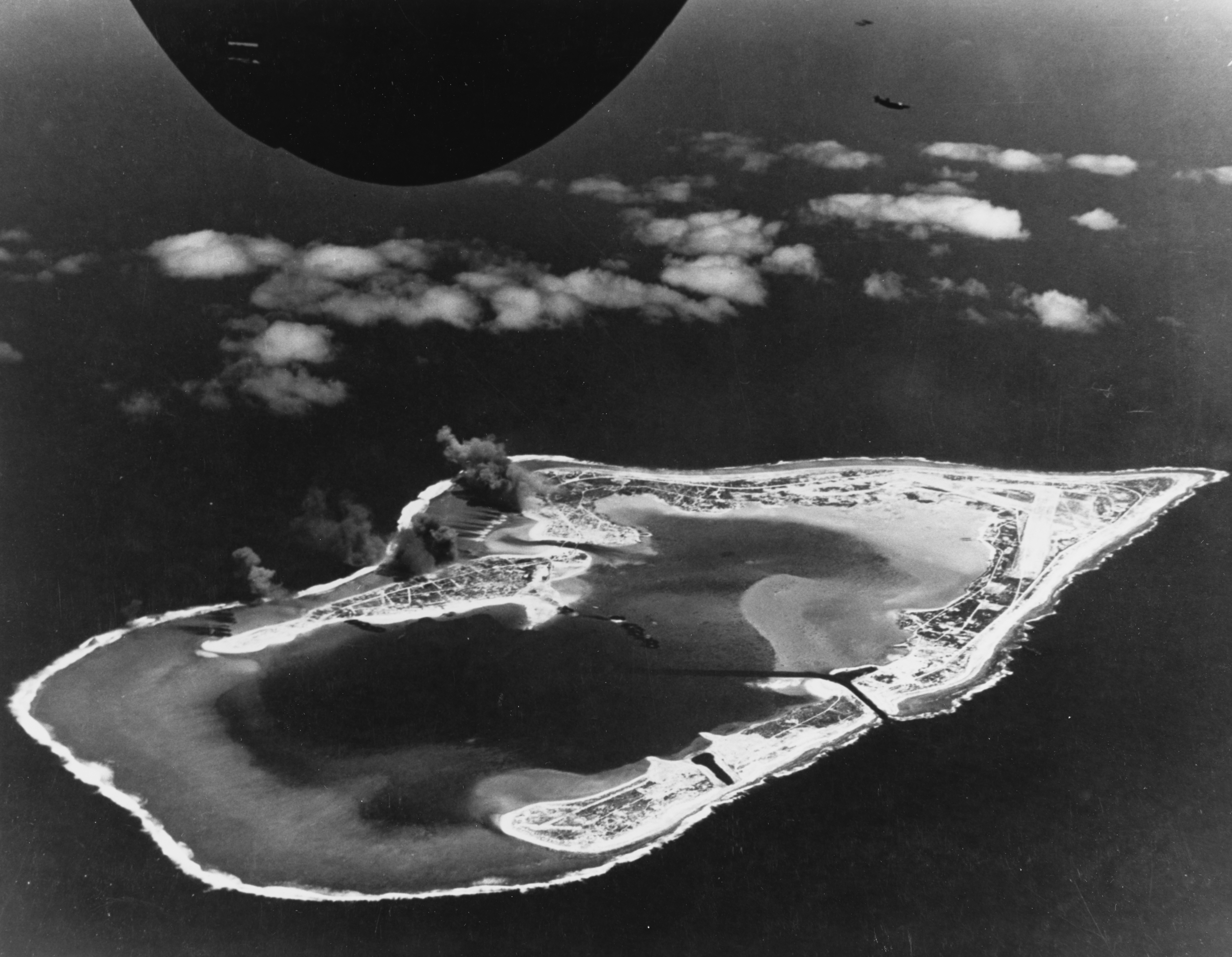
Japanese-held Wake being bombed in March 1944; Peale is on the upper left.

Starting in 1941, the United States Navy began turning Wake into a military outpost, with various fortifications over Wake Island. On Peale, a seaplane ramp for the Naval Air Station was constructed. Also, there were 5-inch (127 mm), 3-inch (76 mm), 50 and 30-caliber machine gun positions and searchlights on Peale Island, such as Toki Point, similar to defensive points on Wake and Wilkes. The main airstrip and most of the military buildings were south, on Wake Island. Many facilities were bombed, including Peale on December 8, 1941, and three days later, on December 11, 1941, a Japanese landing fleet was repelled by the military outpost. The combination of short batteries and air attacks from Grumman F4F Wildcat aircraft sank two ships, some of the first of Pacific War.

The Japanese continued to bomb Wake to limited effect in the coming days, finally attacking again on December 23 with a much larger force and taking the island after the battle.

After the capture, the Japanese had a garrison of 4,000 on Wake and heavily reinforced their defenses. They retained some of the captured POWs to build over 200 pillboxes, bunkers, and other structures, as well as anti-tank ditches, trenches, and minefields. On Peale, an 8-inch naval gun was emplaced.

The island was raided occasionally (in particular, the airstrip remained a threat through much of the war) but otherwise passed by and returned to the United States in September 1945 after Japan surrendered.

== USCGC Loran station ==
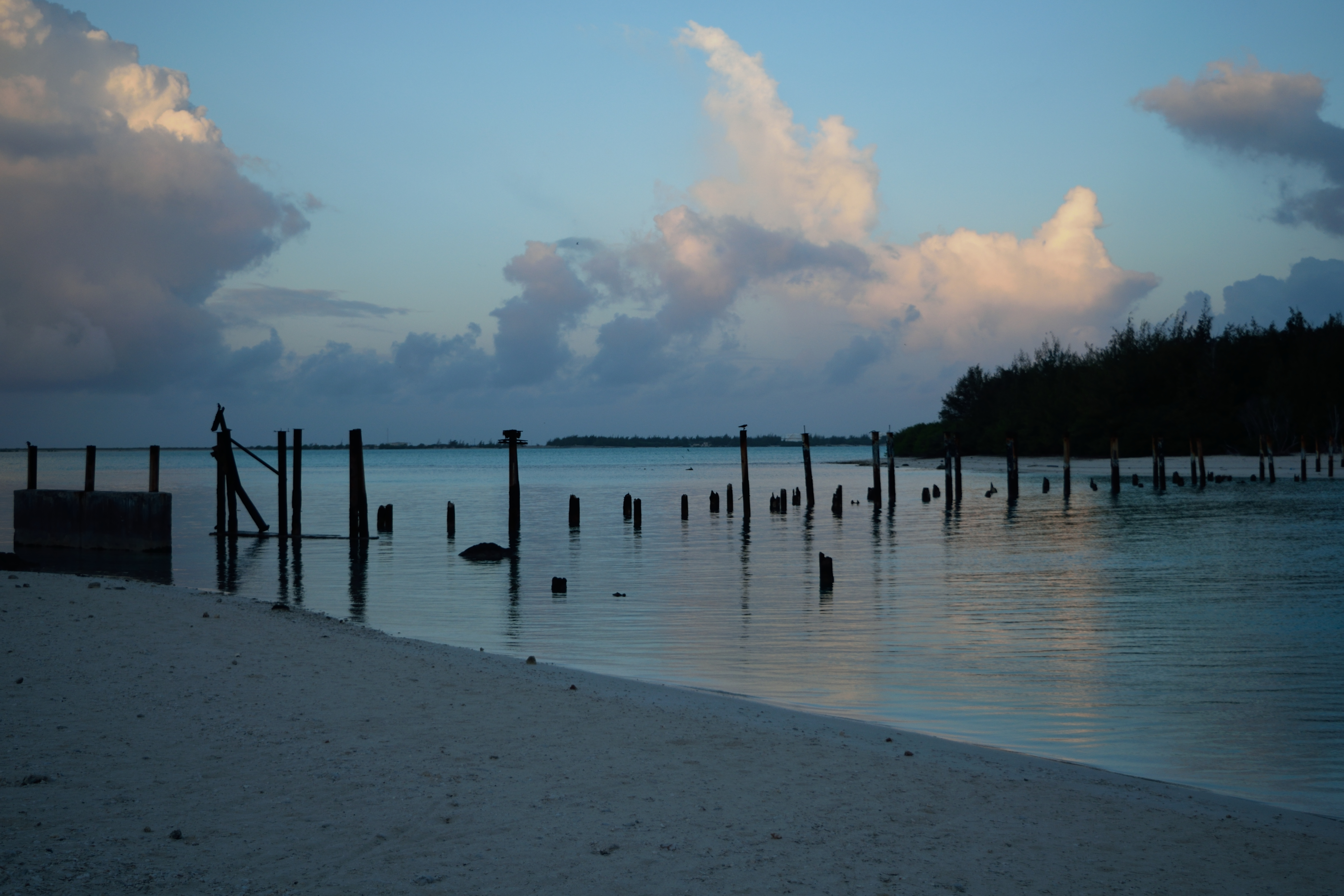
Remains of the old bridge to Peale Island, looking across the channel from Wake

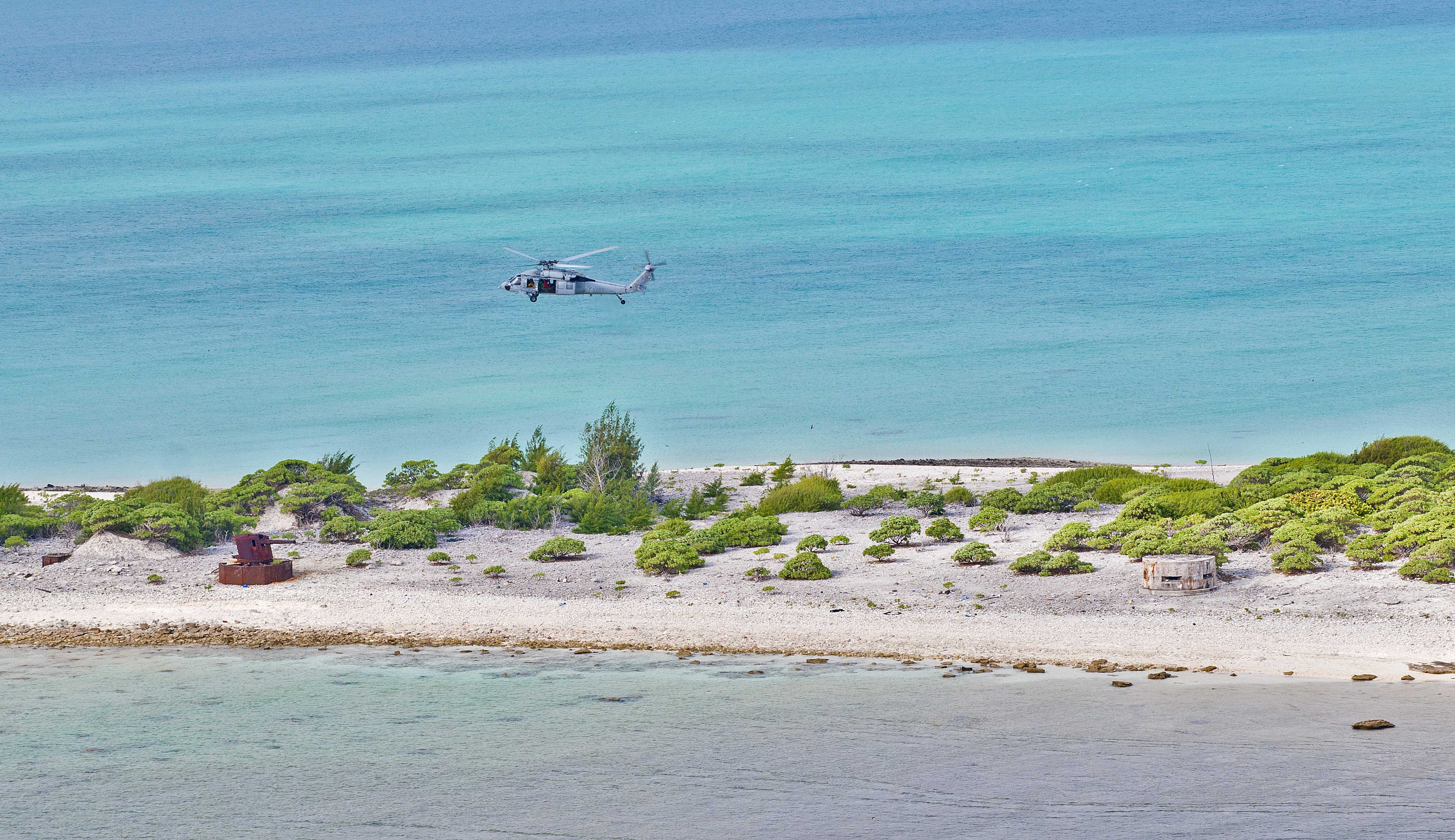
A Navy helicopter passes over Peale Island in 2012.

The United States Coast Guard Loran station, which supported a radio navigation system, had a staff of about ten people and operated from 1950 to 1978, with facilities rebuilt on Peale Island by 1958. Originally, the staff lived on Wake and commuted to the Loran station on Peale across the bridge; the Loran equipment was in a Quonset hut. However, after 1958, new modern facilities were all built on Peale. The cargo ship USCGC Kukui supported construction of the new Loran facilities, arriving at the island in 1957.

== 21st century ==
The bridge between Peale and Wake burned down in the early 2000s. In the 21st century, Peale has mostly been left to nature and is filled with the ruins of the destroyed Pan-American hotel, pier, seaplane ramp, and fortifications from WW2. Peale avenue and Pan-Am road, various old facilities such as the Loran buildings, Navy Barracks, and other remains, are slowly being overgrown with vegetation. Typhoon Ioke stripped much of the vegetation from Toki point when it struck in 2006. The island is periodically visited by small boats or kayaks, that can cross the small channel.
