= Stan Lee (disambiguation) =

Stan Lee (1922–2018) was an American comic book writer and editor.

Stan or Stanley Lee may also refer to:

== People ==
- Stanley Lee (bowls) (1899–1986), English bowls player
- Stan Lee (born 1956), lead guitarist of The Dickies
- Stan Lee (politician) (born 1961), American politician, member of the Kentucky House of Representatives
- Stanley R. Lee (1928–1997), advertising executive and author of novels under the name Stan Lee

== Documentaries ==
- With Great Power: The Stan Lee Story, 2010
- Stan Lee (documentary), 2023

== See also ==
- Stan (disambiguation)
- Stanley (disambiguation)
- Stanly (disambiguation)
