= Stanly =

Stanly may refer to:

== People ==
- Edward Stanly (1810–1872), American Whig congressman
- Fabius Stanly (1815–1882), rear admiral of the United States Navy
- John Stanly (politician) (1774–1834), American Federalist congressman
- John Carruthers Stanly (1774–1845), slave owner and free black resident
- Stanly del Carmen (born 1995), sprinter from the Dominican Republic
- Stanly (footballer) (born 1994), Brazilian footballer Stanly Teixeira dos Santos

== Other uses ==
- Stanly County, North Carolina, United States
  - Stanly Community College, Albemarle, Stanly County, North Carolina
- USS Stanly, a United States Navy destroyer which served in World War II

== See also ==
- Stanley (disambiguation)
- Stan Lee (disambiguation)
