= Wilkes Island =

Minor islet of Wake Island

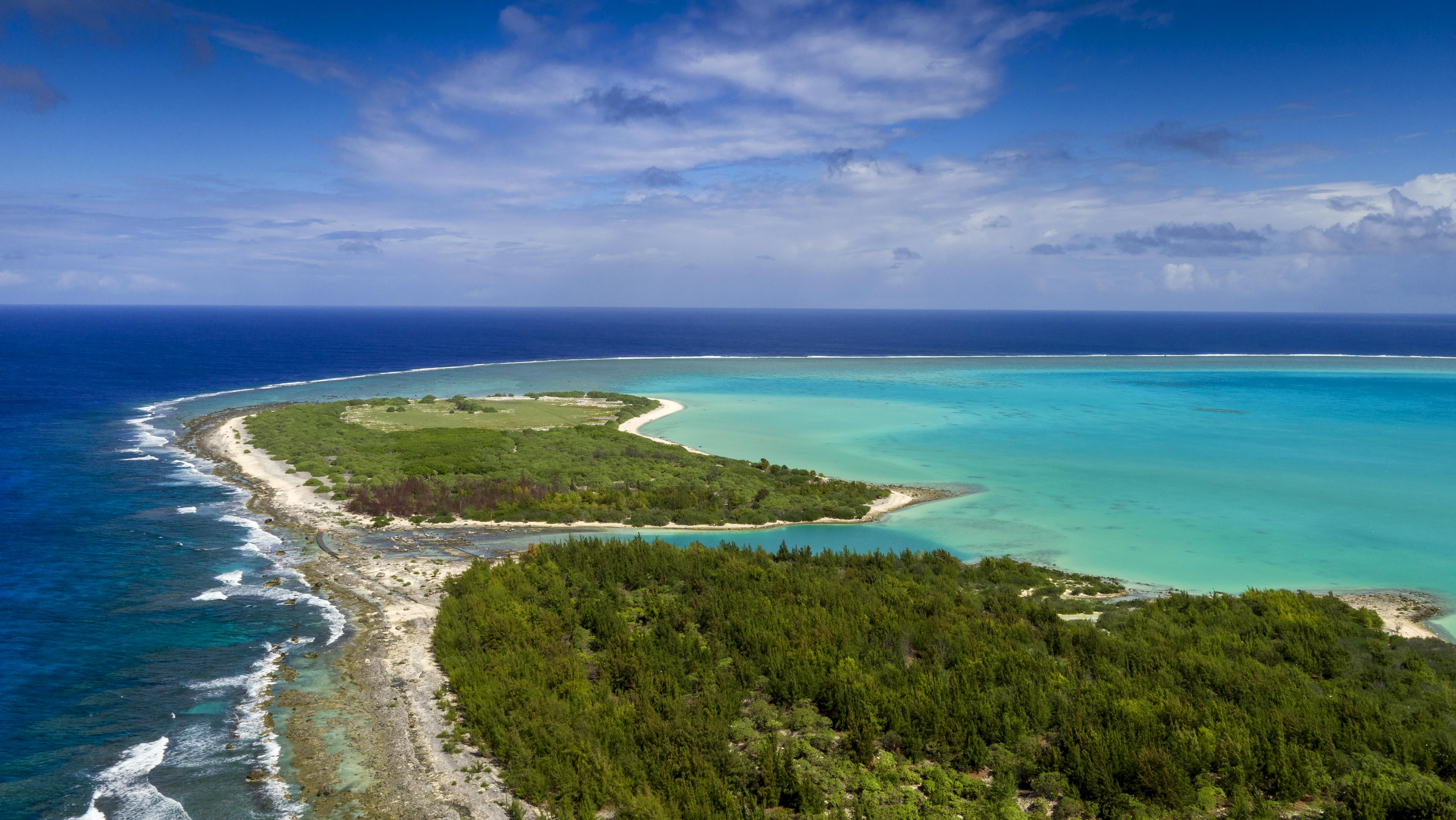
Looking North-west over Wilkes Island, which has almost been split by the old, partially completed submarine channel

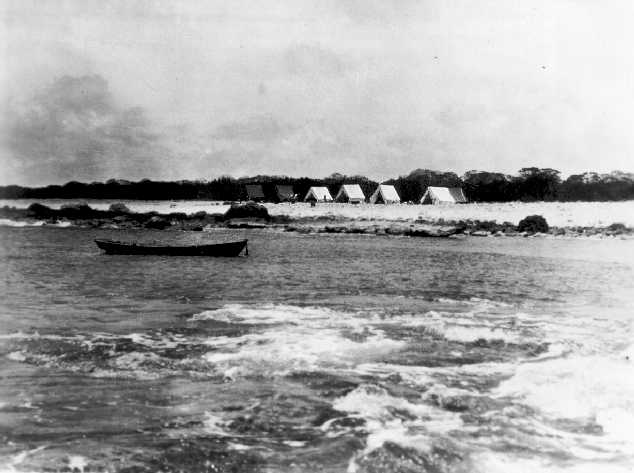
The Tanager Expedition's tent camp on Wilkes Island in 1923

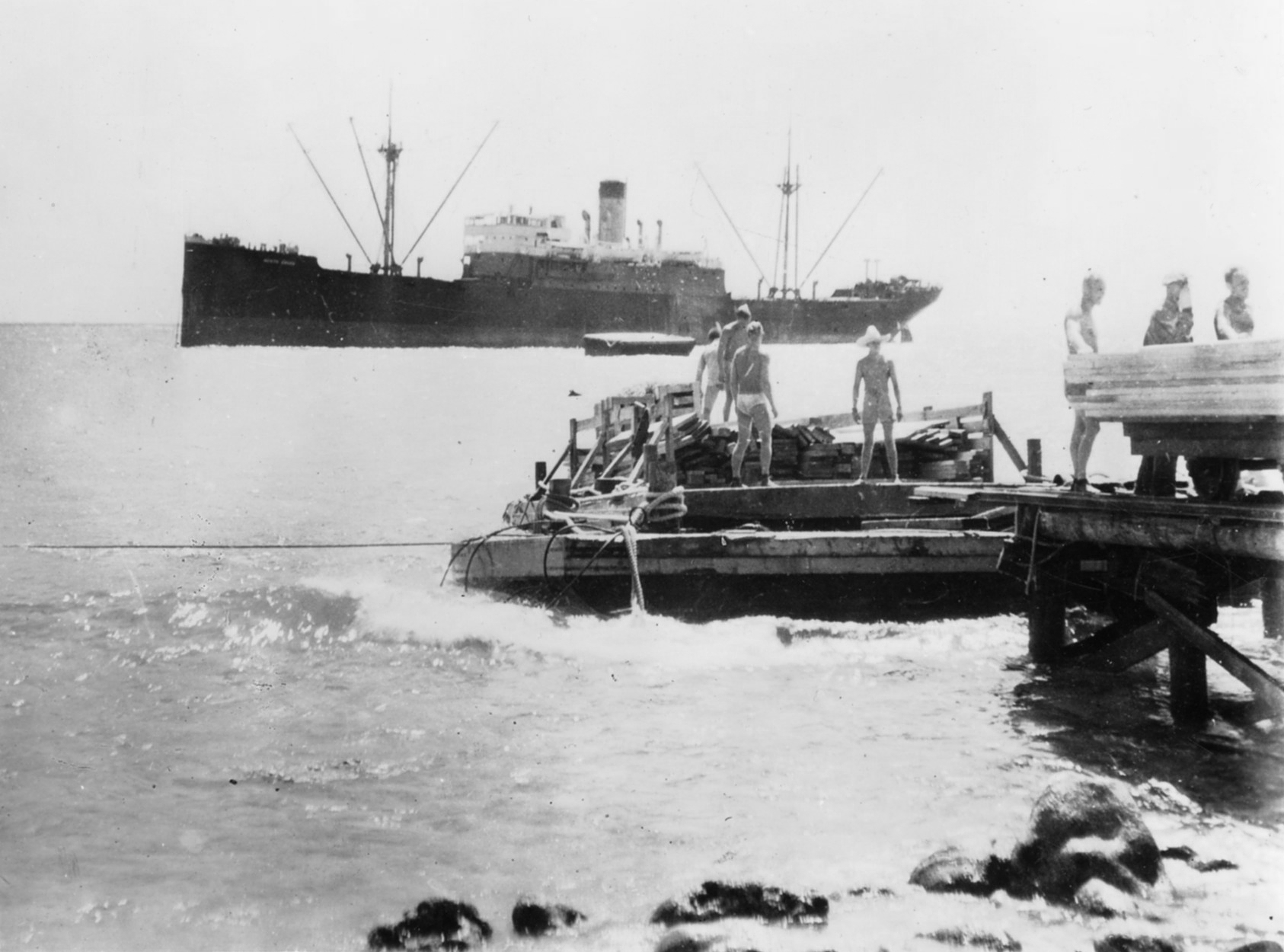
The SS North Haven unloads supplies for the Pan-American seaplane airport in the 1930s.

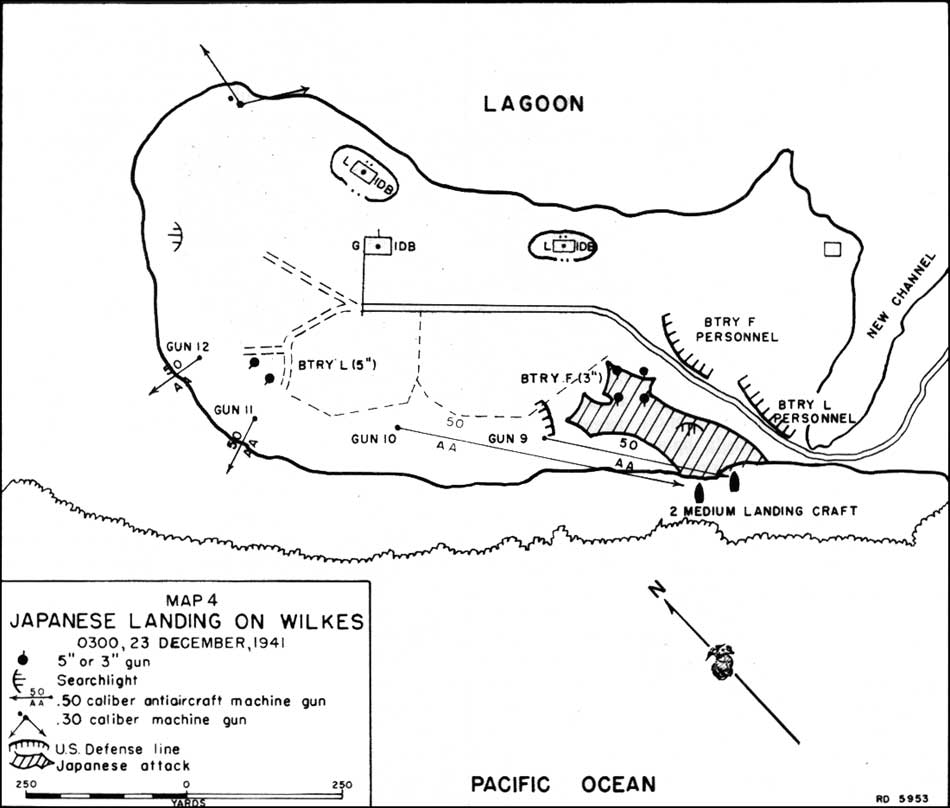
Japanese landing on Wilkes in the battle for Wake Island

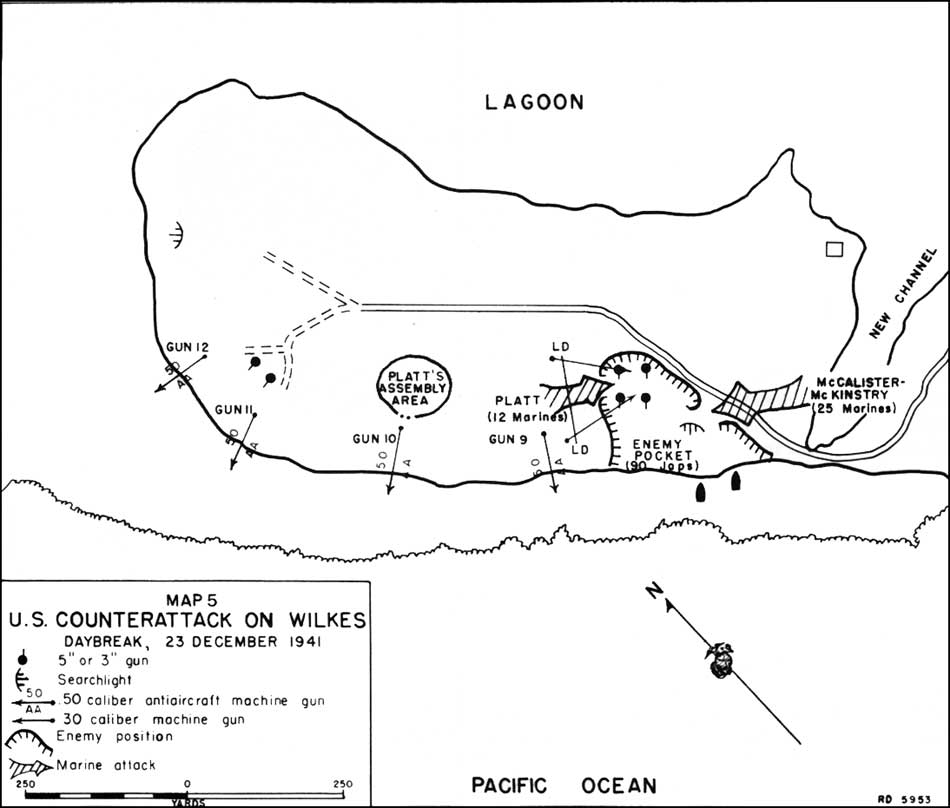
The Marine counter-attack to the landing

Wilkes Island is a small islet that is part of the Wake Island, a remote atoll in the Pacific. The island is cut in half by a partially completed World War II submarine channel, and the eastern half is connected to Wake Island by a causeway. The western half is mostly trees and nature, except for mowed grassy area for seabirds, while the eastern half has facilities for the Wake Island base.

On the north side of Wilkes is the shallow lagoon of the atoll, and across to the north side is Peale Island and the northern hook of the main Wake Island. The south side of Wilkes is coral beach with rocky coral fragments; the waves crash on the coral reef that rings the atoll a short distance from the southern shore of Wilkes.

== Overview ==
Wilkes is on the south and west side of the Wake: The western tip of Wilkes is called Kuku Point, in the middle running north-south is the unfinished submarine channel, and on the south end there is a causeway that crosses Wilkes Channel to the main island.

The Tanager Expedition set up a tent camp on Wilkes in the 1923, when they surveyed Wake Island. Due to the reef making a closer approach hazardous, the ship stayed in deep water just off from the island, and the expedition was brought ashore by a smaller boat. Wake is difficult to land on, as it is ringed on all sides by a coral reef and there was no harbor, the only break is Wilkes channel between Wake and Wilkes.

Wilkes Island was named during the Tanager Expedition for the U.S. Naval officer Charles Wilkes, who led a U.S. expedition to Wake Atoll in 1841.

In the 1930s, it was the site where supplies were off-loaded for the Pan-Am airways seaplane facilities, which was built on Peale Island on the other side of the Wake Lagoon. Supplies were offloaded at Wilkes, moved across a short rail to the other side, then taken by barge across the lagoon to Peale.

It was the location of some of the fighting during the Battle of Wake Island in December 1941. Wilkes was the site of a shore battery and defenses, as part of the overall defenses of Wake island, when World War II broke out. Japanese troops landed on Wilkes Island as part of the invasion of island, which fell on December 23, 1941.

On 10 December 1941, a group of Japanese G3M Nell bombers struck Wilkes island, killing one marine and detonating 120 tons (US tons) of dynamite, which was stored on the island for construction of the military base.

In the 21st century, Wilkes Island is home to a bird sanctuary with at least 12 species of nesting seabird, and up to tens of thousands of birds.

== Weather ==
Summary of the weather at Wilkes, the same as for Wake Island overall:

Wilkes Island

Climate chart (precipitation, max. and min. temperature)
J	F	M	A	M	J	J	A	S	O	N	D
25 24 21	31 21 21	119 24 21	37 23 21	63 25 22	59 26 24	98 26 23	164 26 25	211 26 24	218 25 24	42 24 23	12 23 21
- █ Average max. and min. temperatures in °C
- █ Precipitation totals in mm
Imperial conversion
J	F	M	A	M	J	J	A	S	O	N	D
1 75 70	1.2 70 70	4.7 75 70	1.5 73 70	2.5 77 72	2.3 79 75	3.9 79 73	6.5 79 77	8.3 79 75	8.6 77 75	1.7 75 73	0.5 73 70
- █ Average max. and min. temperatures in °F
- █ Precipitation totals in inches
