= Stanley (Brazilian footballer) =

Brazilian footballer

Personal information
- Full name: Stanley Richieri Afonso
- Date of birth: August 10, 1985 (age 41)
- Place of birth: Sertanópolis, Brazil
- Height: 1.74 m (5 ft 9 in)
- Position: Left-back

Team information
- Current team: Betim

Youth career
- 1994–1995: Sertanópolis-PR

Senior career*
Years	Team	Apps	(Gls)
1995–1996	Sertanópolis-PR		
1996–1999	PSTC-PR		
1999–2000	Tokyo Verdy		
2000	Guarani		
2001–2002	PSTC-PR		
2002–2005	Atlético-PR	1	(0)
2005	Ferroviária		
2006	São Bento		
2006–2007	Atlético-PR	1	(0)
2007	→ Rio Branco-PR (Loan)		
2008–2009	Caldense		
2008	→ Francana (Loan)		
2009	→ Rio Branco-SP (Loan)		
2010–2011	Funorte		
2010	→ Ituiutaba (Loan)	9	(2)
2012	Boa Esporte	2	
2012	Águia de Marabá	7	(0)
2013–	Betim		
- * Club domestic league appearances and goals

Stanley Richieri Afonso (born August 10, 1985), or simply Stanley, is a Brazilian footballer who plays as a left-back for Betim.

== Honours ==
- Japanese League: 2000
- Paraná State League: 2002, 2005
- Dallas Cup: 2004, 2005
