= Sertanópolis =

- Municipality
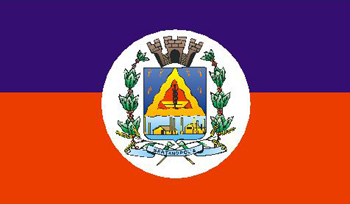
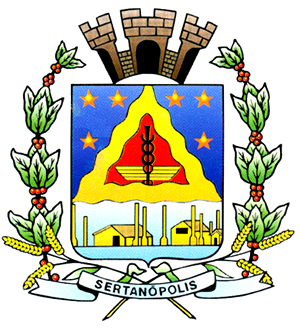
- Flag Coat of arms
- Interactive map of Sertanópolis
- Country: Brazil
- Region: Southern
- State: Paraná
- Mesoregion: Norte Central Paranaense

Population (2020)
  - Total: 16,413
- Time zone: UTC−3 (BRT)

Sertanópolis is a municipality in the state of Paraná in the Southern Region of Brazil.

== Geography ==
The municipality of Sertanópolis is located in the northern part of the state of Paraná in southern Brazil, at approximately 23°03′ S latitude and 51°02′ W longitude. It covers a total area of about 505.5 km², with an elevation ranging from 320 to 384 meters above sea level.

It is bordered to the north by Ranch Alegre, to the east by Sertaneja, to the south by Bela Vista do Paraíso, and to the west by Cambará, giving it a strategic location in the northern agricultural region of Paraná.

The area features fertile soil known as terra roxa, a red mineral-rich soil suitable for agriculture, especially coffee, corn, and soybeans. The climate in Sertanópolis is humid subtropical, with distinct rainy seasons and moderate temperatures throughout the year.

== See also ==
- List of municipalities in Paraná
