= Stanley Park (neighbourhood) =

Neighbourhood in Vancouver, Canada

Coordinates: 49.2914°N 123.1400°W

Stanley Park is a neighbourhood of the West End in Vancouver, British Columbia, Canada. It is designated as the area lying between Denman Street and the boundary of Stanley Park proper. It is high density, like most of the West End, and is known for being a more affluent area of the West End and, once away from Denman Street, also one of the quietest on the downtown peninsula. Condominium properties facing the park are some of the most expensive in the city. The extreme southwest of the area overlaps with the English Bay neighbourhood.
