= Stanly (footballer) =

Brazilian footballer

Personal information
- Full name: Stanly Teixeira dos Santos
- Date of birth: 23 March 1994 (age 32)
- Place of birth: Santa Rita de Cássia, Brazil
- Height: 1.87 m (6 ft 2 in)
- Position: Forward

Youth career
- 2011: Guarujá
- 2011–2012: São Paulo

Senior career*
Years	Team	Apps	(Gls)
2013–2015	São Paulo	0	(0)
2013–2014	→ Portuguesa Santista (loan)		
2015	→ Trofense (loan)	6	(2)
2015–2017	Cesarense	29	(11)
2017	Anadia	15	(6)
2018	Salgueiros	14	(4)
2018–2019	Oliveirense	18	(2)
2019	Desportivo Brasil	5	(1)
- * Club domestic league appearances and goals as of 19:19, 21 November 2021 (UTC)

Stanly Teixeira dos Santos (born 23 April 1994), known as Stanly, is a Brazilian football player.

== Club career ==
He made his professional debut in the Segunda Liga for Trofense on 1 February 2015 in a game against Tondela.
