= Admiral William Standley State Recreation Area =

State recreation area in Mendocino County, California, United States

- Location within California Location within the United States
- Location: Mendocino County, California, United States
- Nearest city: Laytonville, California
- Coordinates: 39°38′47″N 123°37′1″W
- Area: 45.22 acres (18.30 ha)
- Established: 1944
- Governing body: California Department of Parks and Recreation

Admiral William Standley State Recreation Area is a state recreation area of California, United States, featuring 45 acres (18 ha) of redwoods on the Eel River. It is located 14 miles (23 km) west of Laytonville, California, in Mendocino County. The park is a popular spot for salmon and steelhead fishing and also attracts hikers and picnickers.

The park is named for Admiral William Standley, who commanded the battleship California from 1926 to 1927 and later the United States battle fleet at San Pedro, Los Angeles, until appointed Chief of Naval Operations by President Franklin D. Roosevelt in 1933. After retiring in 1937, Standley was recalled to active duty in 1941 and served as United States ambassador to the Soviet Union from 1942 to 1943.
