= Stanley Theater =

Stanley Theater may refer to:

- Stanley Theater (Jersey City), New Jersey
- Stanley Theater (Newark, New Jersey)
- Stanley Theater (Utica, New York)
- Stanley Theatre, Pittsburgh, now the Benedum Center
- Stanley Industrial Alliance Stage, formerly Stanley Theatre, Vancouver, British Columbia
