= Stanley, West Virginia =

Stanley
- Unincorporated community
- Location within the state of West Virginia Stanley (the United States)
- Coordinates: 39°18′31″N 80°53′31″W
- Country: United States
- State: West Virginia
- County: Ritchie
- Elevation: 945 ft (288 m)
- Time zone: UTC-5 (Eastern (EST))
  - Summer (DST): UTC-4 (EDT)
- GNIS ID: 1555701

Stanley is an unincorporated community in Ritchie County, West Virginia, United States.
