= USS William H. Standley =

1964 Belknap-class cruiser

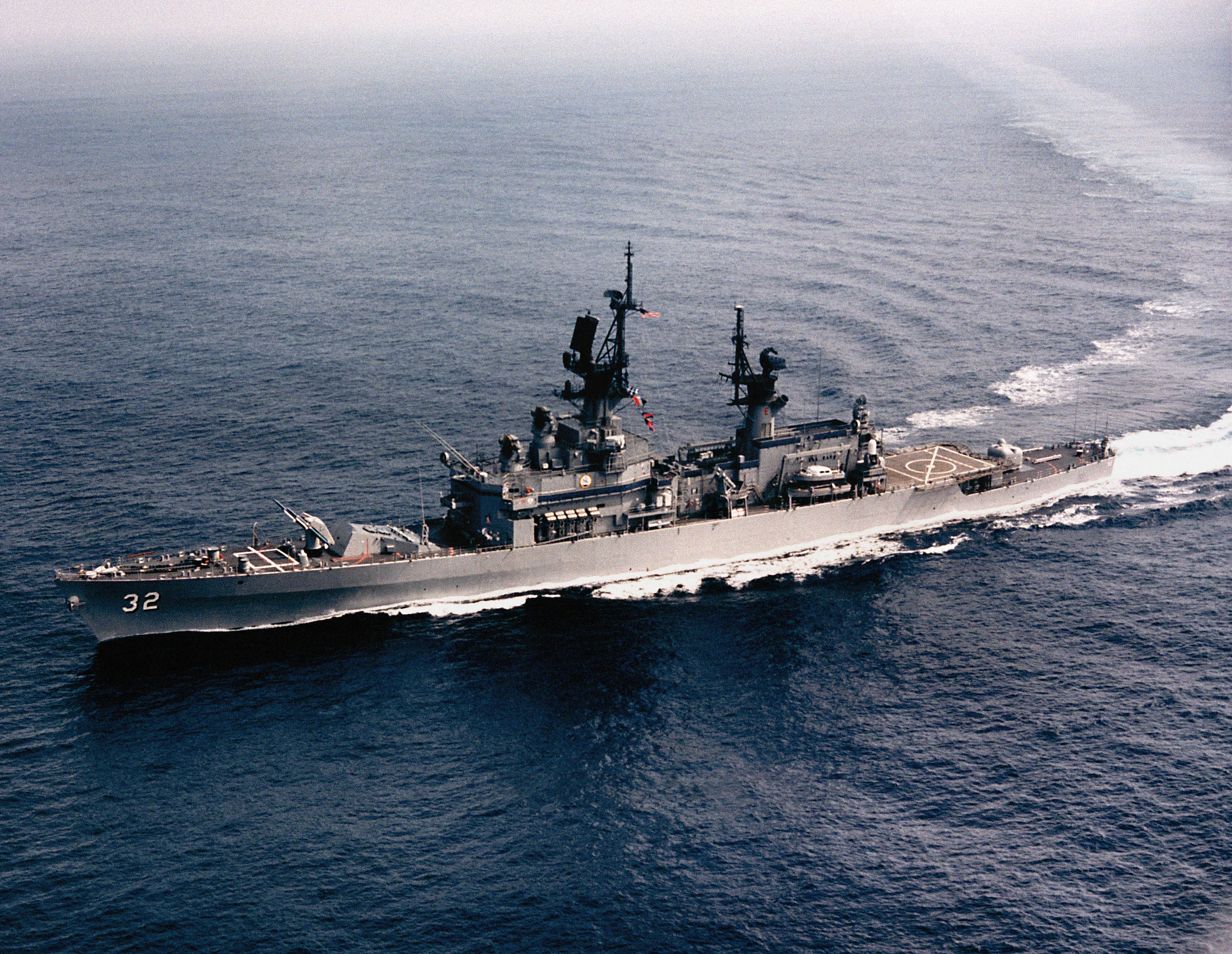
- USS William H. Standley (CG-32)

History

United States
- Name: William H. Standley
- Namesake: William H. Standley
- Ordered: 16 January 1962
- Builder: Bath Iron Works
- Laid down: 29 July 1963
- Launched: 19 December 1964
- Acquired: 28 June 1966
- Commissioned: 9 July 1966
- Decommissioned: 11 February 1994
- Reclassified: CG-32, 30 June 1975
- Stricken: 11 February 1994
- Home port: NS Mayport, NS Charleston and finally NS San Diego (former)
- Fate: Sunk as target, 23 June 2005
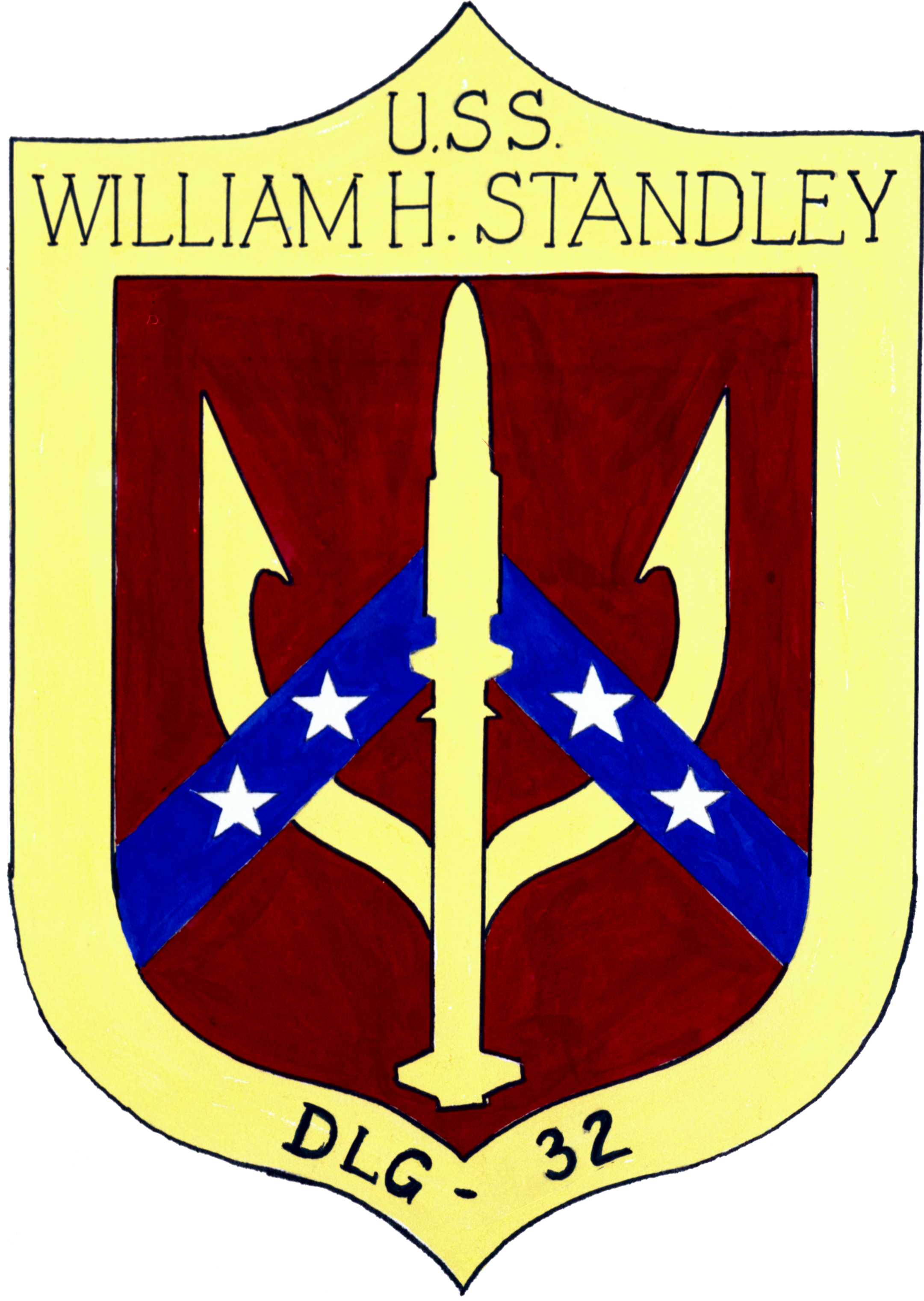
- Badge

General characteristics
- Class & type: Belknap-class cruiser
- Displacement: 7930 tons
- Length: 547 ft (167 m)
- Beam: 55 ft (17 m)
- Draft: 28 ft 10 in (8.79 m)
- Speed: 30 knots (35 mph; 56 km/h)
- Complement: 418 officers and men
- Sensors & processing systems: AN/SPS-48E air-search radar; AN/SPS-49(V)5 air-search radar; AN/SPG-55B fire-control radar; AN/SPG-53F gun fire-control radar; AN/SQS-26 sonar
- Electronic warfare & decoys: AN/SLQ-32
- Armament: 1 × Mark 42 5 in (127 mm)/54-caliber gun; 2 × 3 in (76 mm)/50 caliber guns; 1 × Terrier missile / SM-2ER launcher; 6 × 15.5 in (394 mm) torpedo tubes; Harpoon missiles, Phalanx CIWS

USS William H. Standley (DLG/CG-32) was a Belknap-class destroyer leader / cruiser. She was named for Admiral William Harrison Standley, former Chief of Naval Operations and ambassador to the Soviet Union. She was launched as DLG-32, a frigate, and reclassified Cruiser on 30 June 1975.

== Construction ==
The contract to construct William H. Standley was awarded on 16 January 1962. Her keel was laid down at Bath Iron Works on 29 July 1963. Launched 19 December 1964, and sponsored by Mrs. Charles B. Wincote, daughter of the late Admiral Standley. The vessel was delivered 28 June 1966, and commissioned on 9 July 1966.

== Service history ==
=== 1964–1972 ===
Following fitting-out and ship's qualification trials, William H. Standley spent the holiday season in Boston before heading for Guantanamo Bay, Cuba, in January 1967. After a two and one-half month shakedown period, William H. Standley became flagship for Rear Admiral E. R. Bonner, Commander, Cruiser Destroyer Flotilla 6, during a "Springboard" exercise in the Caribbean Sea. After port visits to San Salvador and San Juan, Puerto Rico, the ship returned to Boston in April for post-shakedown availability.

On 12 June 1967, William H. Standley departed Boston and spent five weeks on operations with the Operational Test and Evaluation Force. During that voyage, she touched at Santa Cruz de Tenerife, Canary Islands. Subsequently, arriving at her first home port, Mayport, Florida, United States, on 14 July 1967, William H. Standley became the flagship for Commander, Destroyer Squadron (ComDes Ron) 8 the following week.

Following an underway period on the Atlantic Fleet Weapons Range and a visit to Frederiksted, U.S. Virgin Islands, William H. Standley prepared for her first deployment to the Mediterranean Sea. On 6 October 1967, the ship left Mayport for the ship's first tour of duty with the United States Sixth Fleet.

Transiting the Atlantic in company with USS Goodrich and USS Turner, William H. Standley joined Task Group (TG) 60.2 as flagship for ComDesRon 8 upon her arrival in the Mediterranean. While attached to the 6th Fleet, the ship witnessed the rapid build-up of Soviet naval strength in the Mediterranean basin and visited the ports of Palma de Mallorca, Spain; Valletta, Malta; Naples, Italy; and Souda Bay, Crete.

For the first three months of 1968, William H. Standley participated in a bilateral exercise with French naval units, "Phiblex 10-68," and conducted picket duty in the eastern Mediterranean, before she sailed for home late in March 1968.

Arriving back at her home port on the 28th, William H. Standley spent a month undergoing post-deployment upkeep, before she conducted planeguard duty for the aircraft carrier USS Intrepid (CVS-11) in May. Soon thereafter, she responded to an emergency recall and got underway to search for the missing submarine USS Scorpion (SSN-589), that had disappeared somewhere south of the Azores while en route back to the United States from a Mediterranean deployment.

William H. Standley conducted an Atlantic transit with ComDesRon 8 embarked and, in company with five submarines and four destroyers, took part in the extensive hunt for the missing submarine. The U.S. Navy officially declared Scorpion as lost on 5 June and William H. Standley returned to Mayport the following day.

==== Vietnam War ====
Later in June, the ship embarked 40 midshipmen and took those officers-to-be on their summer cruise before disembarking them at Norfolk, Virginia, late in July 1968. William H. Standley entered the Charleston Naval Shipyard early in August for restricted availability and received alterations that would permit her to function as a PIRAZ (Positive Identification Radar and Advisory Zone) ship to conduct operations in the Gulf of Tonkin.

After sea trials and a final in-port period at Mayport, William H. Standley departed her home port on 2 December for her first deployment to the Western Pacific area. After a brief stop at the Atlantic Fleet Weapons Range at Vieques, Puerto Rico, William H. Standley proceeded onward, transiting the Panama Canal for the first time on 9 December.

Reaching Hawaii in time for Christmas, William. H. Standley subsequently departed Naval Station Pearl Harbor after the Yuletide holidays and reached Subic Bay, Philippines, early in January 1969 to receive new equipment and run sea trials.

Departing Subic Bay on 23 January for the Gulf of Tonkin, William H. Standley arrived on station and relieved USS Mahan (DLG-11) as PIRAZ ship. During her month on station, the ship maximized the use of her communications systems and her tactical data collection facilities, contributing significantly to United States Seventh Fleet operations off the coast of Vietnam.

Relieved by Mahan on 25 February, William H. Standley sailed for Japan and reached Sasebo five days later for upkeep and recreation. Departing that Japanese port on 14 March, the ship arrived at Subic Bay on the 17th for three days of training.

Resuming her operations in Vietnamese waters on 22 March, William H. Standley began a "difficult and demanding line period." Tensions in Korea had erupted, causing the U.S. naval forces in the Far East to go on alert. North Korean and U.S. forces had exchanged fire briefly near the demilitarized zone between the two Koreas on 11 March, and, on 15 April, North Korean fighters downed an EC-121 reconnaissance plane over international waters in the Sea of Japan. The plane, based at Naval Air Facility Atsugi, Japan, crashed with 31 men on board.

During her 50 days "on the line," William H. Standley spent approximately half the time on PIRAZ station and half on the southern Sea Air Rescue (SAR) station. Operational requirements necessitated the southward movement and required the ship to base two helicopters simultaneously. William H. Standley met the test, earning a commendatory message from Rear Admiral E. J. Rudd, entitled: "Stellar Standley."

Relieved by USS King (DLG-10) on station, William H. Standley sailed to Hong Kong for rest and recreation, arriving at the British Crown Colony on 18 May 1969. Departing on the 24th, the ship sailed for Japanese waters and reached Yokosuka on 28 May.

William H. Standley returned to the "line" after eight days of intensive upkeep, relieving USS Sterett (DLG-31) as southern SAR ship on 9 June. For the next nine days, the ship acted as SAR and strike support ship for the aircraft carriers stationed in the Gulf of Tonkin. Relieved by USS Chicago (CG-11) on 18 June, William H. Standley reached Pearl Harbor on 4 July 1969, pushing on for the Galápagos Islands the next day. Transiting the Panama Canal on 16 July, the ship reached Mayport on 20 July 1969.

From September through the year's end, William H. Standley remained at Mayport, preparing for her second Western Pacific cruise. Underway on 5 January 1971, the ship transited the Panama Canal four days later, and reached Pearl Harbor on the 23rd. After four days in Hawaii, the ship headed for the Mariana Islands, arriving at Guam on 5 February for a six-hour fueling stop.

Upon leaving Guam, William H. Standley set course for Subic Bay and, after assisting a merchantman in distress, the Philippine freighter Santa Anna, reached her destination on 10 February. Two days later, she sailed for the Gulf of Tonkin.

For the next 25 days, William H. Standley escorted the aircraft carrier USS Ranger (CVA-61) on the northern SAR station, before she put into Sasebo for a port visit. After brief patrol duty in the Sea of Japan, the ship returned to the Gulf of Tonkin to serve as PIRAZ vessel. She subsequently visited Hong Kong and Subic Bay (effecting rudder repairs at the latter port) and conducted one more PIRAZ tour before beginning her homeward voyage.

Sailing via Sattahip, Thailand, Singapore, Victoria, Seychelles, Maputo, Mozambique, the Cape of Good Hope, Rio de Janeiro, Brazil and Naval Station Roosevelt Roads, Puerto Rico, William H. Standley reached Mayport on 18 August 1971, having circumnavigated the globe and steamed some 51,000 miles. For the remainder of 1971, the ship participated in refresher training and conducting local operations off the Florida coast.

William H. Standley earned four battle stars for her service along the coast of Vietnam.

=== 1972–1977 ===
Departing Mayport on 19 January 1972, William H. Standley took part in Operation "Snowy Beach" before being detached on the 25th to proceed to Naval Weapons Station Yorktown, Virginia, to take on weapons. Subsequently, returning to Mayport on the 28th, the ship departed her home port on 17 February to participate in Atlantic Fleet exercises. During the course of this cruise, she visited the port of Nassau, Bahamas, and Port Everglades, Florida, before she returned to Mayport on 9 March.

After her post-deployment in-port period, William H. Standley exercised in the Caribbean as flagship for Commander, Cruiser-Destroyer Flotilla (CruDesFlot) 6 that autumn, conducting gunnery shoots, with both guns and missiles, at drone targets under wartime conditions. During her time in Caribbean waters, the ship visited San Juan, Puerto Rico.

As the year drew to a close, the ship prepared for her first major overhaul since commissioning. After entering the Charleston Naval Shipyard on 20 November 1973, William H. Standley spent the first half of 1973 in shipyard hands.

Upon completion of that period of repairs and alterations, William H. Standley conducted missile firings on the Atlantic Fleet Weapons Range and trained at Guantanamo Bay for six weeks, breaking those underway evolutions with visits to San Juan and to Port-au-Prince, Haiti. Called away from her training on 5 August, William H. Standley went to the aid of a foundering Panamanian merchantman off the northeastern tip of Hispaniola.

Embarking 25 naval reservists on 20 March, William H. Standley stood out to sea on that day and operated, for the next nine days, off the eastern seaboard between Jacksonville, Florida, and Charleston, South Carolina. During that time, she conducted an anti-submarine warfare (ASW) exercise against the submarine USS Trutta (SS-421) and conducted LAMPS helicopter work-up, before she returned to her home port and remained there until 30 April.

The ship made one more exercise and spent one more period in port before she headed out from Mayport, bound for the Mediterranean Sea and her second tour with the 6th Fleet. Rendezvousing with TG 27.4, William H. Standley proceeded across the Atlantic. While she was en route, the ship's SH-2D Seasprite helicopter crashed at sea. Of the crew of four men, all but one were rescued. The fourth man went down with the helicopter.

Reaching Rota, Spain, on 22 June, William H. Standley completed turnover procedures with USS Harry E. Yarnell (DLG-17) and then joined Task Force (TF) 60 at sea. During her second deployment with the 6th Fleet, William H. Standley participated in Operations "Good Friendship," "Quick Draw," two "National Weeks," and "Bystander." She visited the ports of Livorno, Italy; Cannes and Golfe-Juan, France; Athens and Corfu, Greece; Mersin and İzmir, Turkey; and Palma de Mallorca, Barcelona, Málaga, and Naval Station Rota, Spain.

Departing Rota on 9 December, William H. Standley transited the Atlantic and arrived at her new home port, Charleston, South Carolina, a week before Christmas of 1973. In port at Charleston between 18 December 1973 and 17 January 1974, the ship then underwent a seven and one-half month overhaul. Following that period of repairs and alterations, William H. Standley trained locally and prepared for another Mediterranean deployment.

Departing Charleston on 14 June 1974, William H. Standley reached Rota on the 27th and, during the early part of her tour, visited the French ports of Saint-Tropez and Theoule, where the ship joined in celebrations commemorating the 30th anniversary of the Allied landings during World War II. She then visited the Italian port of Civitavecchia.

From July to September, William H. Standley spent many days at sea due to the Greco-Turkish crisis on the island of Cyprus. She underwent a brief tender overhaul at Augusta Bay, Sicily, and followed up the repairs with a full slate of underway activities. Highlighting that period were two events: the tow of the ocean escort USS Vreeland (DE-1068) when that ship developed serious boiler trouble on 4 October; and the surveillance of Soviet warships in the eastern Mediterranean. During the latter, William H. Standley discovered a Soviet submarine and maintained sonar contact for over 49 hours, forcing the surfacing of a Zulu-class submarine.

For the remainder of the cruise, the ship continued her schedule of at-sea periods interspersed with visits to Genoa and San Remo, Italy, and to Rota. Departing the last-named port on 24 November, she arrived back in Charleston on 9 December 1974.

Following the ensuing Christmas leave period, the ship underwent repairs at the Norfolk Naval Shipyard, Portsmouth, Virginia, and emerged from the yard late in February 1975. On 1 July 1975, William H. Standley was redesignated as a guided missile cruiser, CG-32. As the summer wore on, the ship operated out of Guantanamo Bay, Roosevelt Roads, and San Juan. She subsequently sailed for the Mediterranean on 2 October 1975, leaving Charleston in her wake on that day, bound, as before, for Rota.

Taking over from USS Luce (DDG-38), William H. Standley operated in the "middle sea" into the winter, spending Christmas at Naples. The guided missile cruiser remained in the Mediterranean into the spring before turning over her duties to Harry E. Yarnell at Gibraltar on 25 April 1976 and heading for Charleston on that day.

=== 1977–1994 ===
Between mid-February and late July 1977, William H, Standley conducted one more deployment to the 6th Fleet. After returning to Charleston on 1 August, the guided missile cruiser sailed at the end of the month to join the United States Pacific Fleet. Leaving Charleston behind on the last day of August, William H. Standley transited the Panama Canal on 5 and 6 September, reaching her new home port of Bremerton, Washington, on the 29th. En route, she had touched at San Diego and San Francisco, and rescued a fishing boat adrift off Santa Barbara, California.

William H. Standley underwent a major overhaul from the autumn of 1977 into the late summer of the following year. She then ran trials and operated locally on training evolutions out of San Diego, spending Christmas holidays in port.

While in the Persian Gulf on May 17, 1987, USS Stark FFG-31 was struck by two Iraqi Exocet missiles, killing 37 sailors and wounding 21. This precipitated an increased concern for vital shipping in the Persian Gulf. Kuwaiti tankers were re-flagged to the U.S. allowing for escort by U.S. warships. Standley, participating in Operation Earnest Will in the Summer and Autumn of 1987, provided anti-air defense for both escorted convoys and Operation Nimble Archer making ship's company eligible for the Armed Forces Expeditionary Medal.

From June 1990 to August 1991, William H. Standley received a comprehensive overhaul including New Threat Upgrade (NTU), a major anti-aircraft warfare systems improvement.

=== Decommissioning and fate ===
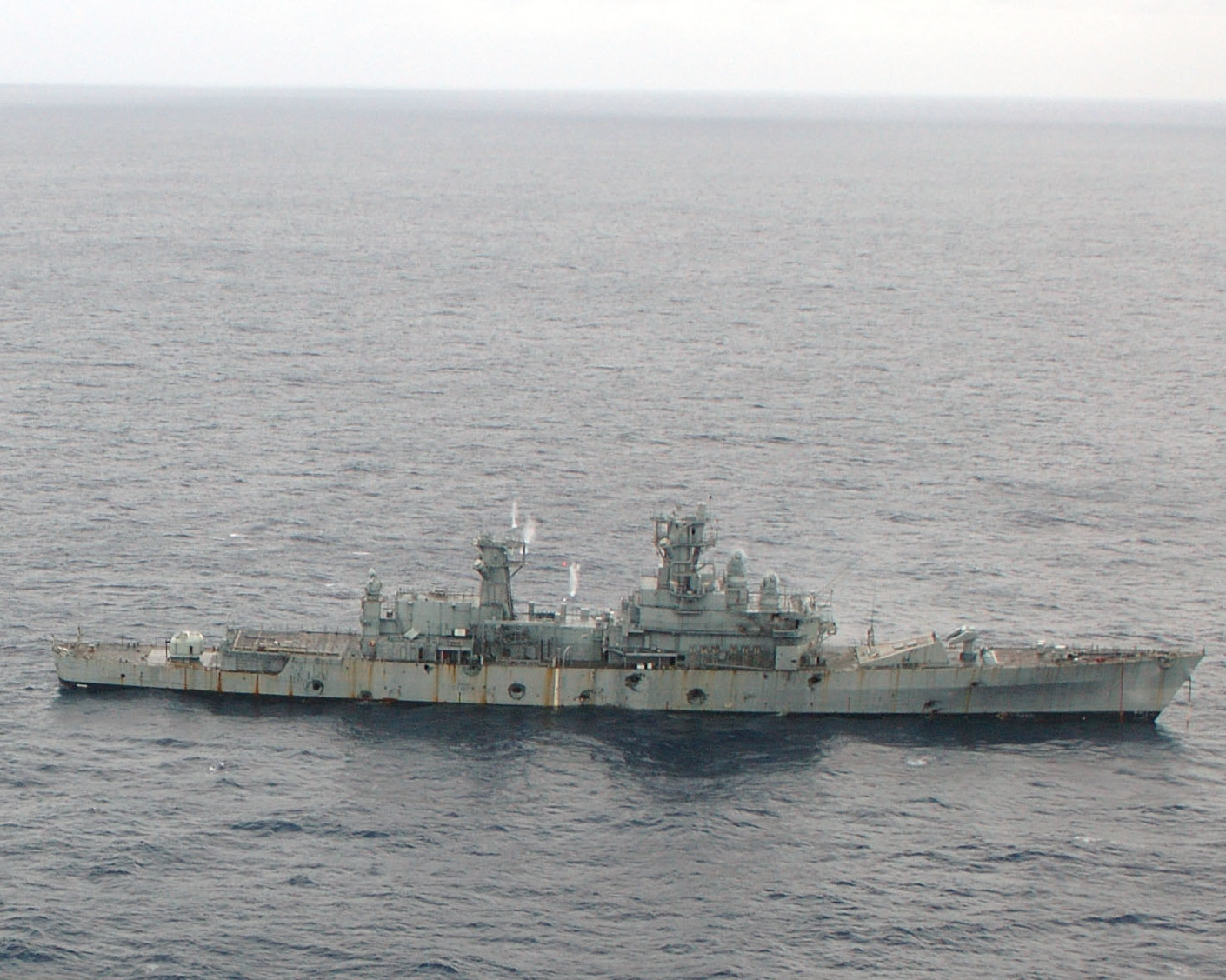
Standley used as a target for Exercise Talisman Saber 2005

After more than 27 years of service, William H. Standley was decommissioned on 11 February 1994. She was struck the same day and would be sunk in a fleet exercise. ex-William H. Standley and ex-Elliot were sunk off the eastern coast of Australia as part of Exercise Talisman Sabre, Elliot on 22 June 2005 and William H. Standley on 23 June 2005. Both ships are now artificial reefs in the Coral Sea, with William H. Standley resting at a depth of 4,526 metres (14,849 ft; 2,475 fathoms) at 24°47′S 155°48′E, or roughly 100 nautical miles (185 km) east of Fraser Island, Queensland, Australia.
