= Stanley Park railway station =

Proposed railway station in Liverpool, England

Anfield

General information
- Location: Anfield, Liverpool City Council; England
- Coordinates: 53.4334°N 2.960°W
- Grid reference: SJ362934
- Managed by: Merseyrail
- Transit authority: Merseytravel
- Platforms: 2

Stanley Park is a proposed new railway station in Anfield, Liverpool, England.

The proposed station would coincide with the expansion of nearby Anfield stadium due to the increase in capacity of the stadium to 60,000. It would be on the former Canada Dock Branch that closed to passengers in 1948 close to the site of the former Anfield Station. This was again mentioned in Merseytravel's 30-year plan of 2014.
