= Stanley Peak, South Georgia =

Mountain in South Georgia

Stanley Peak
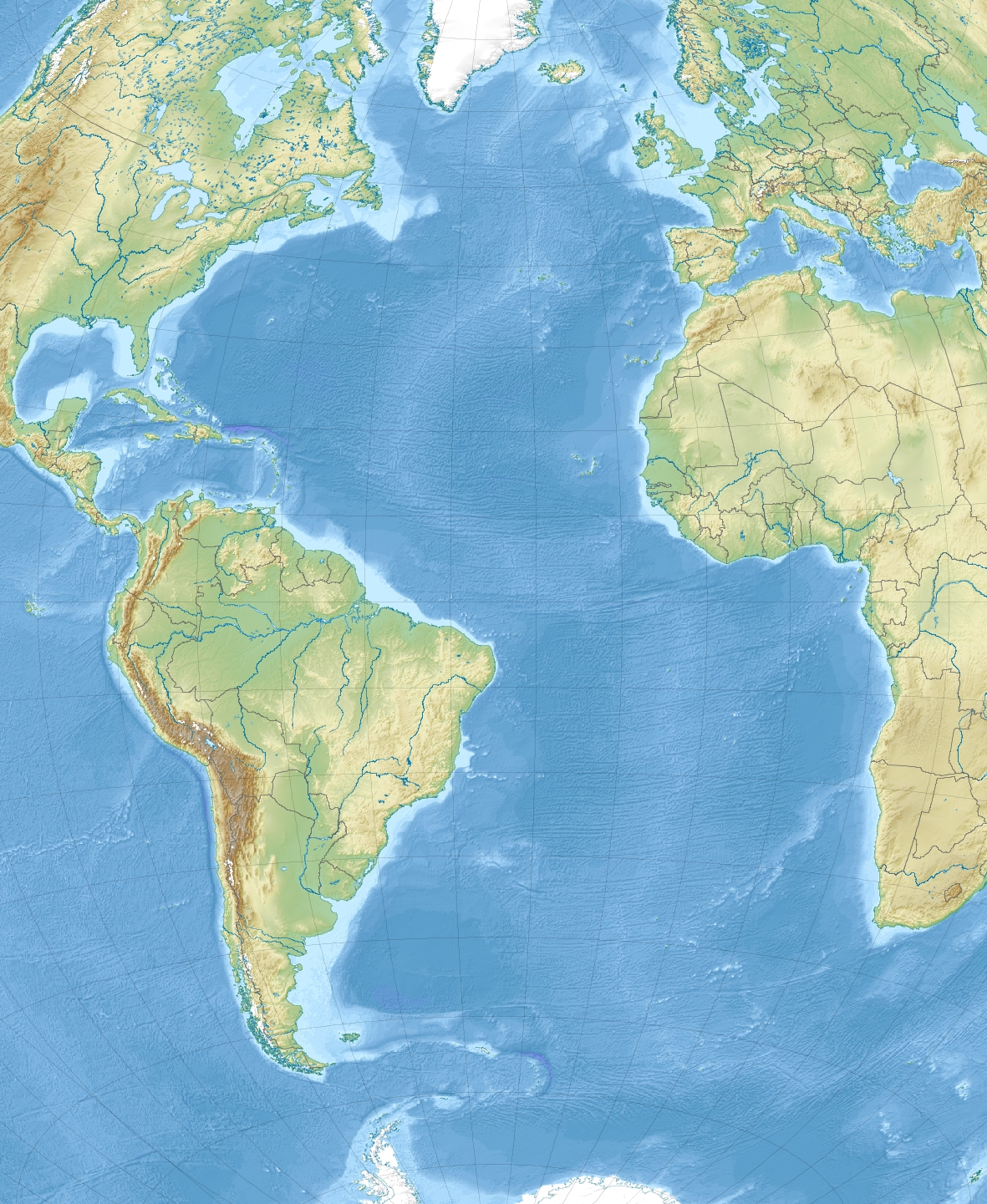
- Location within South Georgia Island Location within Atlantic Ocean Location within South America Location within Antarctica

Highest point
- Coordinates: 54°11′S 36°55′W

Naming
- Etymology: Commander Ian Stanley

Geography
- Country: United Kingdom
- Region: South Georgia

Stanley Peak is a central summit in the Wilckens Peaks, rising to 1,265 m at the head of Fortuna Glacier, South Georgia. It was named by the UK Antarctic Place-Names Committee (UK-APC) after Lieutenant Commander (later Cdr.) Ian Stanley, Royal Navy, a helicopter pilot from HMS Antrim, who carried out a rescue operation in bad weather after two helicopters had crashed on Fortuna Glacier, 21 April 1982.
