= William Harrison Standley =

United States Navy admiral (1872–1963)

William H. Standley
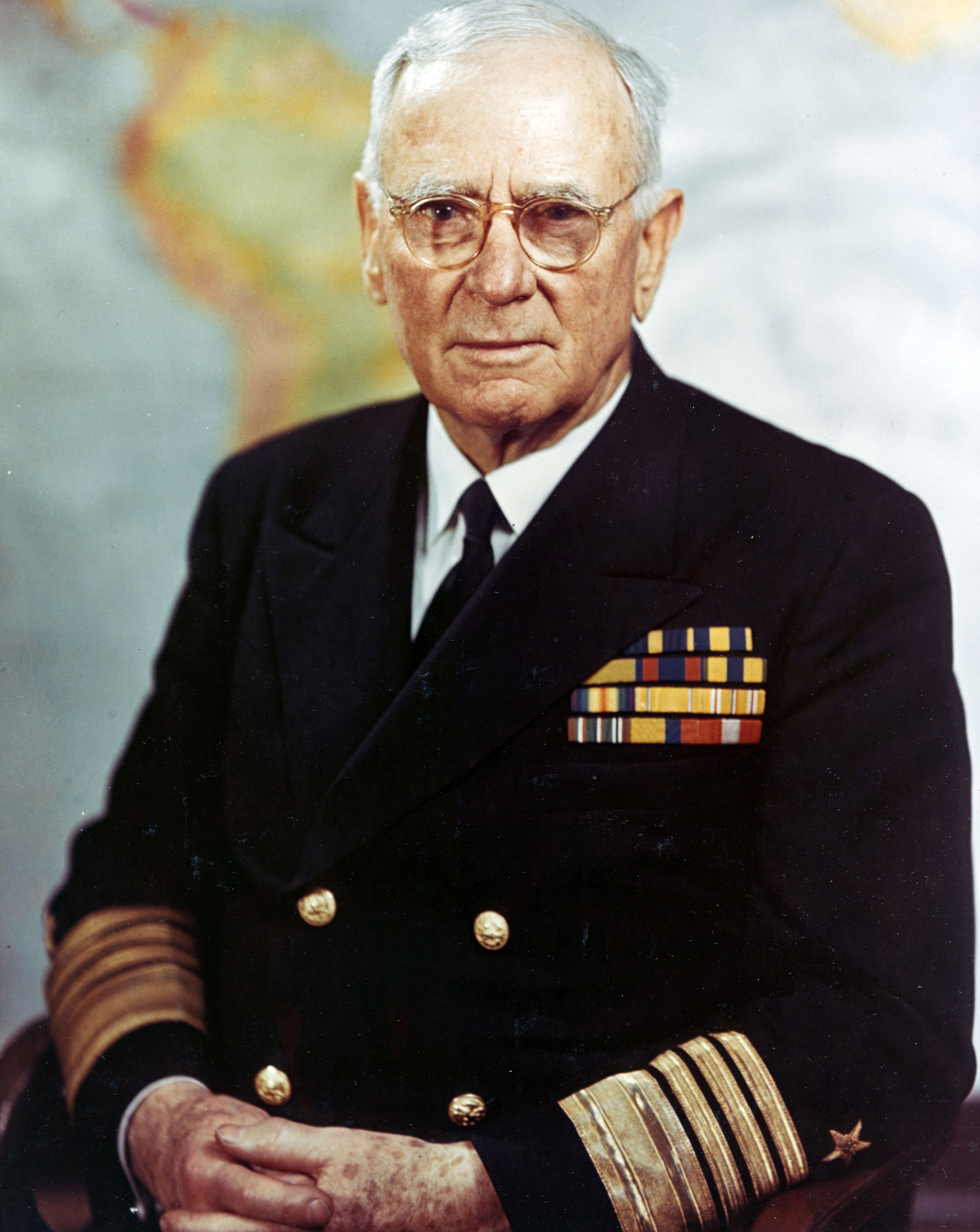
- Formal portrait, 1945

4th United States Ambassador to the Soviet Union
- In office 14 April 1942 – 19 September 1943
- President: Franklin D. Roosevelt
- Preceded by: Laurence Steinhardt
- Succeeded by: W. Averell Harriman

6th Chief of Naval Operations
- In office 1 July 1933 – 1 January 1937
- President: Franklin D. Roosevelt
- Preceded by: William V. Pratt
- Succeeded by: William D. Leahy

Personal details
- Born: 18 December 1872 Ukiah, California, U.S.
- Died: 25 October 1963 (aged 90) San Diego, California, U.S.

Military service
- Branch/service: United States Navy
- Years of service: 1895–1937; 1941–1945
- Rank: Admiral
- Commands: Chief of Naval Operations; Battle Force, United States Fleet; Cruisers, Battle Force; Destroyers, Battle Force; USS California (BB-44); USS Virginia (BB-13); USS Yorktown (PG-1)
- Battles/wars: Spanish–American War; Philippine–American War; World War I World War II
- Awards: Navy Distinguished Service Medal; Legion of Merit

William Harrison Standley (18 December 1872 – 25 October 1963) was an admiral in the United States Navy, who served as Chief of Naval Operations from 1933 to 1937. He also served as the U.S. ambassador to the Soviet Union from 1941 until 1943.

== Early life ==
Standley was born in Ukiah, California, where his grandfather operated a hotel and his father, Jeremiah "Doc" Standley, was Mendocino County Sheriff.

He graduated from the United States Naval Academy in 1895. He then served the required two years' sea duty in the cruiser USS Olympia before he received his commission as an ensign in 1897.

== Spanish–American War ==
During the Spanish–American War, Standley served in the monitor USS Monterey and later in the gunboat USS Alert. After the fighting with Spain had ended, he joined the gunboat USS Yorktown during the Philippine–American War. He received a commendation for bravery during a volunteer reconnaissance mission carried out at Baler, on 11 April 1899. In conjunction with a feint conducted by Lieutenant J. C. Gilmore, Standley, then an ensign, ventured into enemy territory to reconnoiter insurgent positions.

== Peacetime ==
Ordered to the gunboat USS Marietta on 29 May 1901, Standley later became Officer in Charge, Branch Hydrographic Office, San Francisco, California, in October of the same year. Assigned to the training ship USS Pensacola in June 1902, he later served as engineer in the ship USS Adams and as aide to the Commandant of the Naval Station at Tutuila, Samoa. Designated as the captain of the yard there in 1905, Standley discharged his duties as officer in charge of the native guard and chief customs officer until detached with orders to the United States in October 1906.

Reporting to the receiving ship USS Independence in January 1907, Standley served as executive officer of the cruiser USS Albany from February 1909 to August 1910. From January 1910, he also discharged duties as Albany's navigator as well. Standley then reported to the armored cruiser USS Pennsylvania on 3 November 1910 and was navigator of that ship until becoming aide to the Commandant of the Mare Island Navy Yard at Vallejo, California. After three years in that post, Standley became executive officer of the battleship USS New Jersey and later took command of the gunboat Yorktown on 15 May 1915.

== World War I ==
Returning to the Naval Academy on 14 October 1916, as Assistant to the Superintendent in charge of Building and Grounds, Standley later served for 11 months as Commandant of Midshipmen. Under his direction, the new seamanship and navigation buildings were constructed and over $4,000,000 spent in enlarging Bancroft Hall to accommodate the increased number of midshipmen appointed during the World War I period. For his "highly meritorious" service in those posts at Annapolis, Standley received a special letter of commendation from the Secretary of the Navy.

Detached from the Naval Academy in July 1919, Standley soon thereafter assumed command of the pre-dreadnought battleship USS Virginia and, a year later, received orders to attend the Naval War College. After completing his studies at Newport, Standley returned to sea, serving as Assistant Chief of Staff to the Commander in Chief, Battle Fleet, from 5 July 1921 to 30 June 1923, before he reported to Washington for duty heading the War Plans Division in the Office of the Chief of Naval Operations (CNO). Completing the latter tour on 1 February 1926, Standley then commanded USS California from 15 February 1926 to 11 October 1927.

Standley returned to shore duty in Washington, D.C., as Director of the Fleet Training Division, Office of the CNO, and held that post until 14 May 1928. He then served as Assistant CNO until 17 September 1930, when he became Commander, Destroyer Squadrons, Battle Fleet, a title that changed to Commander, Destroyers, Battle Force, United States Fleet, on 1 April 1931, with additional duty as Commander, Destroyers, United States Fleet. Designated as a member of the Navy Department's Selection Board on 18 November 1931, Standley became Commander, Cruisers, Scouting Forces, with additional duties as Commander, Cruisers, U.S. Fleet, and Commander, Cruiser Division 5, on 16 December of the same year.

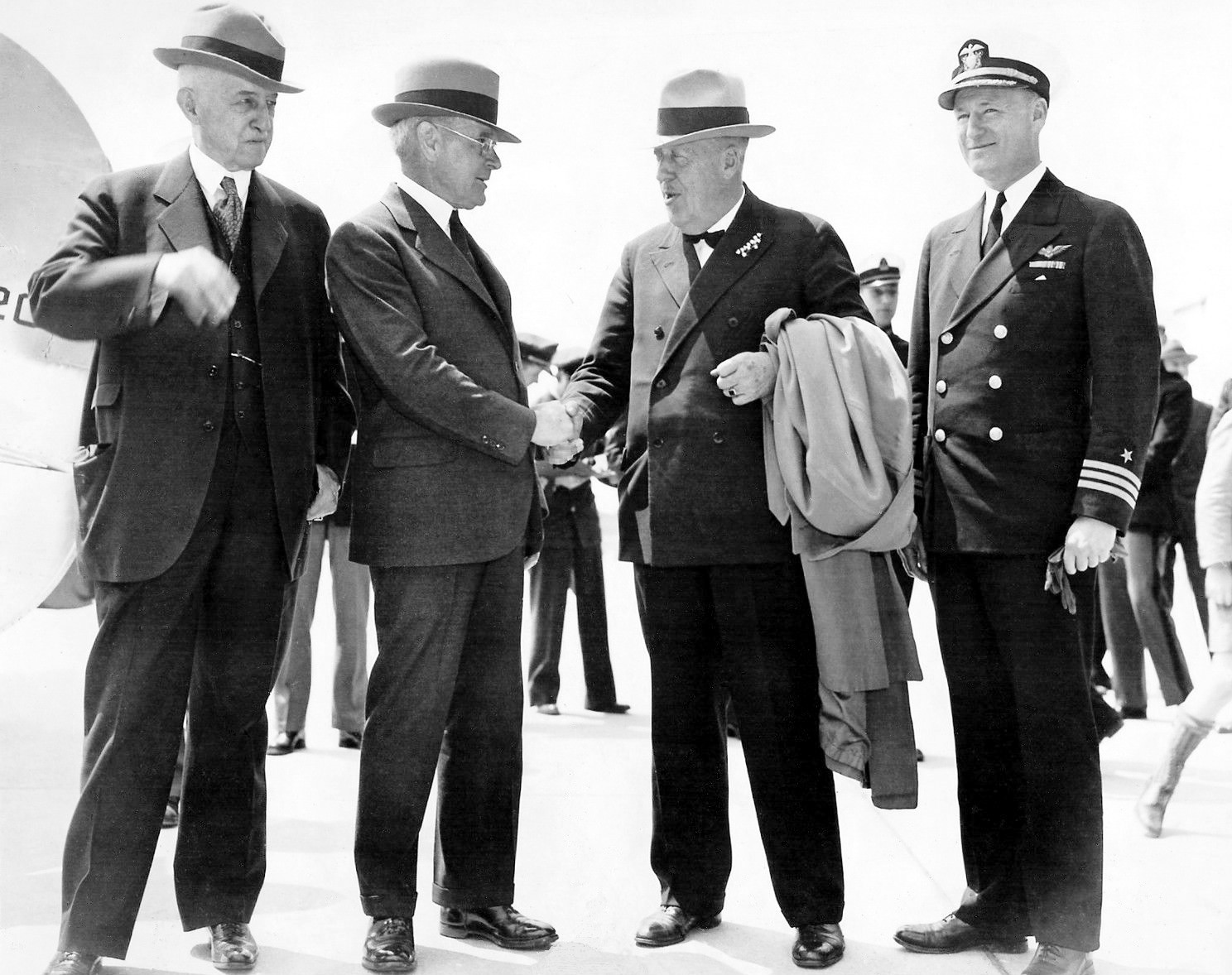
Standley shaking hands with Hugo Eckener during the official welcome of the LZ 129 Hindenburg to the United States in 1936

Appointed vice admiral, on 20 January 1932 while in command of the Battle Force's cruisers, Standley was placed in command of the Battle Force, U.S. Fleet, with the rank of admiral, on 20 May 1933. Breaking his flag in his former command, California, the admiral remained at sea until 1 July 1933, when President Franklin Roosevelt appointed him Chief of Naval Operations, replacing William V. Pratt.

Unlike Pratt, who had been content being primus inter pares among the bureau chiefs of the Navy, Standley asserted his position over them and treated them as his subordinates. This sat ill with Standley's opponents who felt that they were subordinate to the Secretary of the Navy, including William D. Leahy, then chief of the Bureau of Navigation, and Ernest King, then the newly appointed chief of the Bureau of Aeronautics. The argument grew severe enough for Standley to bring it directly to the President who decided to uphold the status quo and the CNO's limited authority. For his part, Standley never forgave Leahy for contesting him, even trying to prevent him from being appointed as Commander, Battleships, Battle Force. He continued to persist in doing so amid the support of Secretary Claude A. Swanson and the commander of the United States Fleet, Joseph M. Reeves. This was eventually overcome and Leahy assumed his intended position with the rank of vice admiral as planned.

From 1935 to 1936 he served as President of the Army Navy Country Club in Arlington, Virginia.

Before being retired, at his own request, on 1 January 1937 and handing over the reins of office to Admiral William D. Leahy, Admiral Standley frequently performed the duties of Acting Secretary of the Navy, due to the declining health of Secretary of the Navy Claude A. Swanson. Standley represented the United States as a delegate to the London Naval Conference between 7 December 1935 to 25 March 1936 and signed that accord on behalf of the United States. In addition, during his tenure as CNO, Standley initiated the Vinson–Trammell Naval Bill that provided for establishing, building, and maintaining the navy at treaty strength.

== World War II ==
Recalled to active duty on 13 February 1941, Standley served as naval representative on the planning board of the Office of Production Management (OPM) for seven months. After leaving the OPM in the autumn of 1941, Standley served as the American naval member on the Beaverbrook-Harriman Special War Supply Mission to the Soviet Union. Upon his return, Standley became a member of the Navy Board for Production Awards.

When President Roosevelt established the Roberts Commission to investigate the attack on Pearl Harbor, he selected Admiral Standley as one of the members of that sensitive body that studied the attack into early 1942. In February 1942, Standley was appointed American Ambassador to the USSR, a post he held into the autumn of 1943. Standley resigned after making controversial remarks in which he angrily claimed that the Soviets were taking full credit for the war against Germany.

"The Russian authorities seem to want to cover up the fact that they are receiving outside help. Apparently, they want their people to believe that the Red Army is fighting this war alone."

Subsequently recalled to active duty once more, in March 1944, Standley served in the Office of Strategic Services throughout the remaining period of hostilities. Relieved of all active duty on 31 August 1945, Standley lived in retirement at San Diego, California, until his death on 25 October 1963. After the war, he became involved with various anti-communist groups, including the Moral Re-Armament.

== Legacy ==
The cruiser USS William H. Standley (CG-32) was named in his honor. Admiral William Standley State Recreation Area, a California state recreation area, is also named for him, as is Standley middle school in San Diego. There is also a City of San Diego Recreation Center named in his honor.

=== In popular culture ===
- Standley was portrayed by Charles Lane in War and Remembrance.

Military offices
Preceded by William V. Pratt	Chief of Naval Operations; 1933–1937	Succeeded by William D. Leahy
Diplomatic posts
Preceded by Laurence A. Steinhardt	United States Ambassador to the Soviet Union; 1942–1943	Succeeded by W. Averell Harriman
