= List of ship commissionings in 1945 =

The list of ship commissionings in 1945 includes a chronological list of ships commissioned in 1945. In cases where no official commissioning ceremony was held, the date of service entry may be used instead.

Date	Operator	Ship	Class and type	Notes	Ref
7 January	United States Navy	Dayton	Cleveland-class cruiser		
8 January	United States Navy	Amsterdam	Cleveland-class cruiser		
10 January	United States Navy	Chicago	Baltimore-class cruiser		
15 January	Royal Navy	Vengeance	Colossus-class aircraft carrier		
17 January	Royal Navy	Venerable	Colossus-class aircraft carrier		
28 January	United States Navy	Antietam	Essex-class aircraft carrier		
29 January	United States Navy	Abatan	Pasig-class distilling ship		
30 January	United States Navy	LST-1081	LST-542 class tank landing ship		
January (unknown date)	French Navy	Dixmude	Charger-class escort carrier		
3 February	United States Navy	Tucson	Atlanta-class cruiser		
5 February	United States Navy	Gilbert Islands	Commencement Bay-class escort carrier		
17 February	United States Navy	St. Paul	Baltimore-class cruiser		
1 March	United States Navy	Hugh Purvis	Allen M. Sumner-class destroyer		
5 March	United States Navy	Cape Gloucester	Commencement Bay-class escort carrier		
10 March	United States Navy	Cahuilla	Abnaki-class tug		
17 March	United States Navy	Cutlass	Tench-class submarine		
31 March	United States Navy	Rowan	Gearing-class destroyer		
9 April	United States Navy	Vella Gulf	Commencement Bay-class escort carrier		
16 April	United States Navy	Boxer	Essex-class aircraft carrier		
29 April	United States Navy	Bremerton	Baltimore-class cruiser		
12 May	United States Navy	Kula Gulf	Commencement Bay-class escort carrier		
12 May	United States Navy	Richard B. Anderson	Gearing-class destroyer		
14 May	United States Navy	Siboney	Commencement Bay-class escort carrier		
15 May	United States Navy	Providence	Cleveland-class cruiser		
19 May	United States Navy	Salerno Bay	Commencement Bay-class escort carrier		
8 June	United States Navy	Columbus	Baltimore-class cruiser		
9 June	United States Navy	Conserver	Bolster-class rescue and salvage ship		
17 June	United States Navy	Little Rock	Cleveland-class cruiser		
18 June	United States Navy	Puget Sound	Commencement Bay-class escort carrier		
25 June	United States Navy	Portsmouth	Cleveland-class cruiser		
1 July	United States Navy	Fall River	Baltimore-class cruiser		
16 July	United States Navy	Bairoko	Commencement Bay-class escort carrier		
22 July	United States Navy	Los Angeles	Baltimore-class cruiser		
28 July	United States Coast Guard	Northwind	Wind-class icebreaker		
26 August	United States Navy	Macon	Baltimore-class cruiser		
4 September	United States Navy	Helena	Baltimore-class cruiser		
4 September	United States Navy	Saidor	Commencement Bay-class escort carrier		
10 September	United States Navy	Midway	Midway-class aircraft carrier		
10 October	United States Navy	Caloosahatchee	Cimarron-class oiler		
16 October	United States Navy	Point Cruz	Commencement Bay-class escort carrier		
22 October	United States Navy	Rendova	Commencement Bay-class escort carrier		
26 October	United States Navy	Richard B. Anderson	Gearing-class destroyer		
27 October	United States Navy	Franklin D. Roosevelt	Midway-class aircraft carrier		
15 November	United States Navy	Badoeng Strait	Commencement Bay-class escort carrier		
4 December	United States Navy	Mindoro	Commencement Bay-class escort carrier		
20 December	United States Navy	Reclaimer	Bolster-class rescue and salvage ship		
