= CA74 =

CA74 or CA-74 may refer to:

- USS Columbus (CA-74), a United States Navy Baltimore-class heavy cruiser
- California State Route 74, a highway in the US state of California
- Gifu Station, a railway station in Gifu, Gifu Prefecture, Japan, (station code CA74)
