= USS Helena (CA-75) =

United States Navy heavy cruiser

Coordinates: 46.5849238°N 112.0407559°W

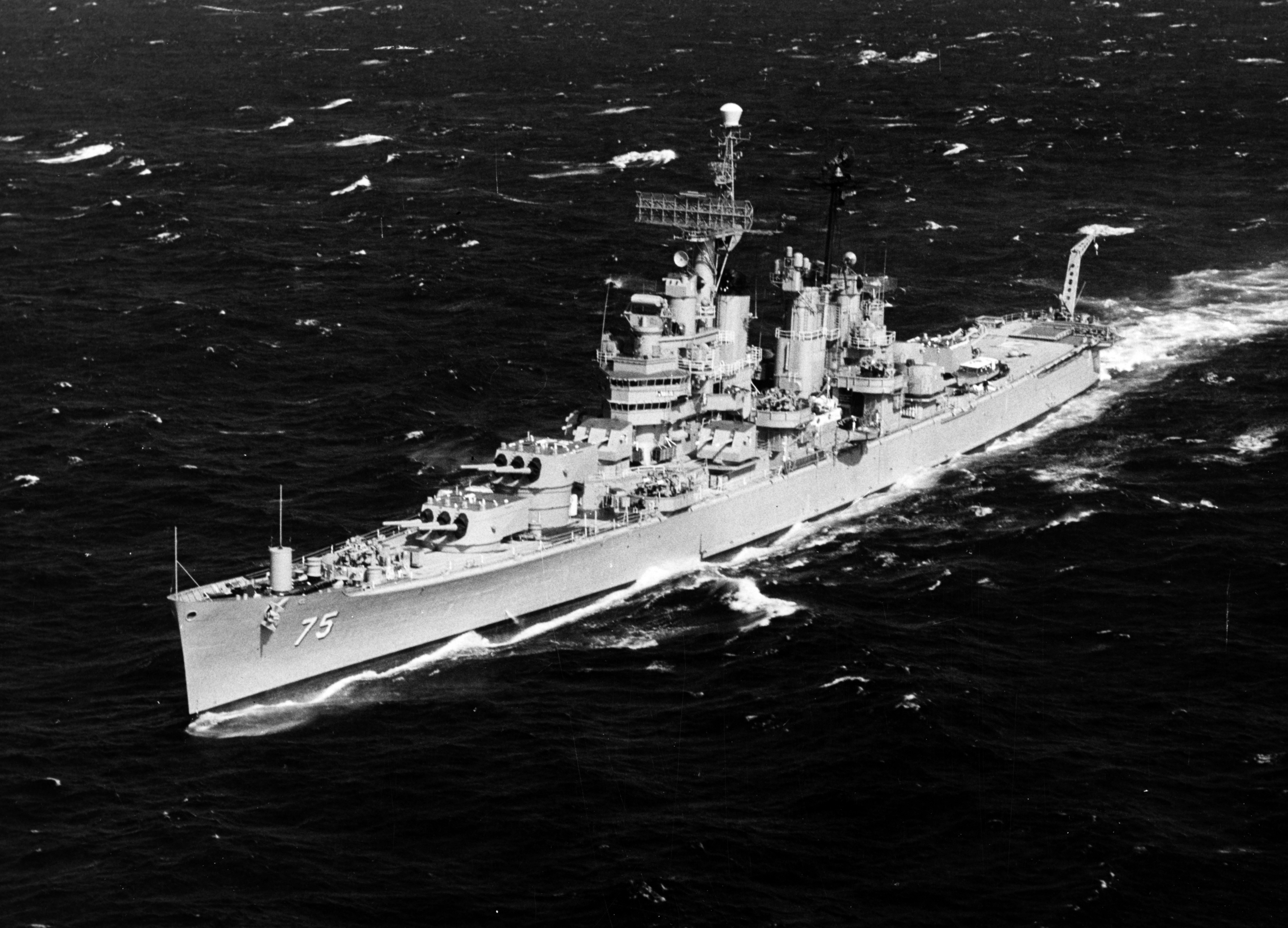
- USS Helena in 1961–1962

History

United States
- Name: Helena
- Namesake: City of Helena, Montana
- Builder: Bethlehem Steel
- Laid down: 9 September 1943
- Launched: 28 April 1945
- Sponsored by: Mrs. John T. Haytin
- Commissioned: 4 September 1945
- Decommissioned: 29 June 1963
- Renamed: from Des Moines, 1944
- Stricken: 1 January 1974
- Identification: Callsign: NUDR; Hull number: CA-75
- Motto: Proud and Fearless
- Honors and awards: See Awards
- Fate: Scrapped, 13 November 1974

General characteristics
- Class & type: Baltimore-class cruiser
- Displacement: 13,600 tons
- Length: 674 ft 11 in (206 m)
- Beam: 70 ft 10 in (22 m)
- Draft: 20 ft 6 in (6 m)
- Speed: 33 knots (38.0 mph; 61.1 km/h)
- Complement: 1,142
- Armament: 9 × 8-inch/55 caliber guns; 12 × 5-inch/38 caliber guns; 48 × 40 mm guns; 22 × 20 mm guns

USS Helena (CA-75), a Baltimore-class heavy cruiser, was the third ship of the United States Navy to be named for the city of Helena, Montana. Originally laid down as the USS Des Moines, she was renamed Helena while under construction after the 5 October 1944 cancellation of the Fargo-class light cruiser USS Helena (CL-113).

== Construction and commissioning ==
Helena was launched at the Bethlehem Steel Company in Quincy, Massachusetts, on 28 April 1945, sponsored by Mrs. John T. Haytin, wife of the mayor of Helena. She was commissioned on 4 September 1945 with Captain Arthur Howard McCollum in command.

=== 1940s ===
Helena completed her outfitting in the Boston, Massachusetts, area and departed on 24 October 1945, arriving in New York City the next day to take part in the tremendous celebration of the U.S. Navy's role in World War II victory that marked Navy Day, 27 October 1945. After two shakedown cruises and training periods at Guantánamo Bay, Cuba, Helena returned to Boston in February 1946 to prepare for her first deployment, a round-the-world cruise. Helena departed Boston on 12 February 1946 for England, where Admiral H. Kent Hewitt boarded and broke his flag as Commander Naval Forces, Europe, and Commander, 12th Fleet. During the next three months, Helena conducted training exercises in Northern European waters and paid good-will visits to major ports in England and Scotland.

Relieved as flagship on 1 May 1946, Helena departed for East Asia via the Suez Canal, calling at major Mediterranean ports; Colombo, Ceylon; and Singapore before arriving at Qingdao, China, on 18 June 1946. During her tour in East Asia, Helena took part in a wide variety of training exercises and fleet maneuvers until she finally departed Shanghai, China, on 22 March 1947 for the United States after more than a year in foreign waters.

After training operations in California waters Helena departed once more for the East Asia on 3 April 1948, arriving at Shanghai 24 days later. Throughout the summer and fall of 1948, she operated primarily in Chinese waters, returning to Long Beach, California, in December 1948.

Helena spent much of the spring of 1949 in training a new crew and in May 1949 cruised to train Naval Reservists, returning to Long Beach for a conversion necessary to equip her to carry a helicopter. During July and August 1949, Helena took part in a six-week at-sea training cruise for men of the Naval Reserve Officers' Training Corps to the Galapagos Islands and Panama. She then took part in Operation Miki, a joint United States Army-U.S. Navy amphibious training exercise in the Hawaiian Islands conducted in November 1949.

Helena then proceeded via Yokosuka, Japan, and Hong Kong to the Philippines, where she conducted training exercises. She returned to Japan in January 1950, and soon after experienced the highlights of her service as flagship of the United States Seventh Fleet when the Joint Chiefs of Staff, then touring East Asia, embarked on 2 February 1950. During the remainder of her East Asian tour she carried out a schedule of large-scale fleet exercises off Okinawa and visits to Japanese ports. She departed for the United States on 21 May 1950.

=== 1950s ===
==== Korean War ====
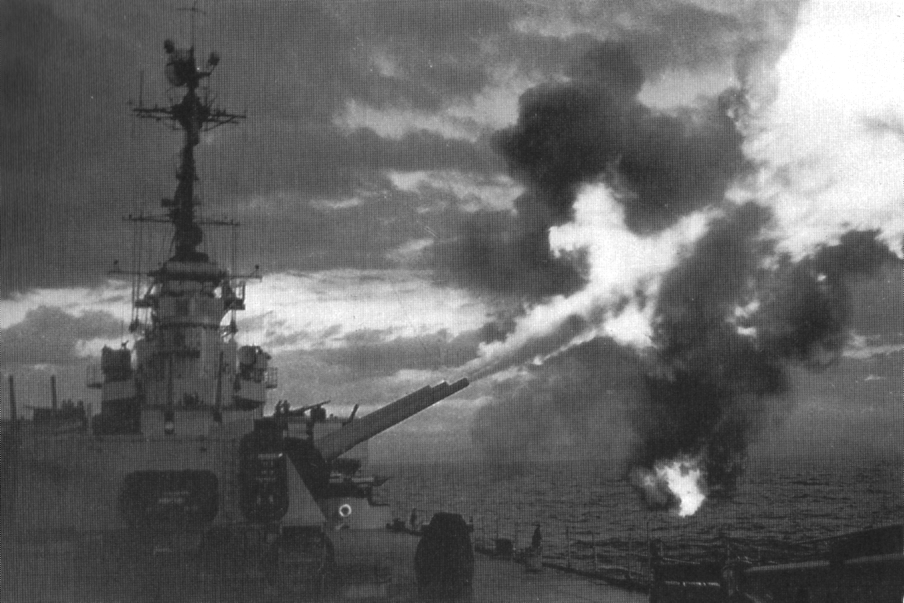
Helena fires her 8-inch/55-caliber (203-mm) guns at enemy forces ashore on the Korean Peninsula in August 1950 during the Korean War.

Helena's schedule called for a summer spent in Long Beach, California, followed by an overhaul at the San Francisco Naval Shipyard. Suddenly came word of the communist aggression in Korea. Hurriedly she prepared for sea; and, on 6 July 1950, sped westward. Stopping at Pearl Harbor, Hawaii, only to take on ammunition, she plowed across the Pacific and into action on the east coast of Korea. On 7 August, she first unleashed her guns on an enemy target—the railroad marshalling yards, trains, and power plant near Tanchon.

Serving as flagship of the Bombardment Task Group, Helena pounded enemy positions, aiding immeasurably in keeping the invaders off balance and preventing them from mounting a formidable drive, as United Nations forces prepared to take the offensive. Operations such as hers provided the diversion necessary to cover the powerful amphibious assault into Inchon, on 15 September 1950, Later, Helena provided gunfire support for Korean troops pushing the invaders north along the east coast, and it was Helena's, concentrated firepower that aided in creating a diversion at Samcheok, and in the recapture of Pohang.

Valuable as she was in Korean waters, Helena could no longer put off overhaul, and in November 1950 she arrived at Long Beach to prepare for the now twice-postponed yard period.

After her overhaul, she reported for duty in Sasebo, Japan, on 18 April 1951, and was assigned to Task Force 77, the fast carrier group making daily air strikes against the enemy. While operating as heavy support for the carriers, Helena was often detached to pound shore targets. During June 1951, she was occupied almost continually in interdiction fire at targets along the east coast of Korea, subsequently she returned to the Task Force, At twilight on a day late in July, Helena was straddled and then hit by shore gunfire. Damage was light, and, swiftly twisting around the harbor in the maneuver which came to be called "the war dance", Helena delivered rapid continuous fire that destroyed seven enemy gun positions and an ammunition dump. After a short respite at Yokosuka, she returned again to the Task Force, but was soon detached for special duty supporting a massive air strike on supply depots and rail road marshalling yards at Rason, acting as radar picket.

Helena's accurate gunnery was next sought by the Eighth Army, for whom she fired at 13 targets along the bombline in aid of advancing infantry. Her support to ground forces continued with missions fired for United States Marines and Republic of Korea Army units. On 20 September 1951 she returned to Yokosuka. Here, at a ceremony on her decks, President Syngman Rhee of Korea presented to Task Force 95 the first Korean Presidential Unit Citation awarded to a naval unit. Helena received the award for her operations in the fall of 1950.

After rejoining the Task Force, Helena was ordered to duty as fire support vessel in the Hungnam-Hamhung area. With her helicopter providing its usual efficient spotting, she fired with great success on rail and highway bridges, marshalling yards and gun positions for the next 2 weeks.

Helena returned to Long Beach on 8 December 1951 and her entire battery of nine 8-inch (200 mm) guns was replaced. In February, she commenced training for return to the Far East. One of the highlights of this training period came from 14 February to 23 February 1952 when she took part in "Lex Baker One", the largest scale training exercise held since the outbreak of the Korean War. Over 70 ships and 15,000 sailors and Marines took active part in this operation.

Helena arrived once again at Yokosuka on 8 June 1952 and the next day was underway to rendezvous with Task Force 77 off the coast of Korea. For 5 months her mission again was to burn buildings, destroy gun positions, and smash transportation facilities; all were left in her wake after shore bombardments. She also performed air rescue of pilots, two of whom were deep in enemy territory.

On 24 November 1952, Helena was relieved of her normal duties at Yokosuka and 5 days later sailed on a special mission. She called first at Iwo Jima where on 1 December Admiral Arthur W. Radford, Commander In Chief Pacific Fleet, boarded the ship by helicopter to visit briefly. Two days later she proceeded to Guam, where President-Elect Dwight D. Eisenhower, with several of his prospective cabinet members, and Admiral Radford embarked for passage to Pearl Harbor. Top-level policy conferences were held on board. Helena's distinguished passengers disembarked at Pearl Harbor on 11 December 1952, and she returned to Long Beach on 16 December.

==== Post-Korean War ====
Helena departed for the Far East on 4 August 1953 to join Task Force 77 on security patrol in the Sea of Japan and after another voyage to the United States for upkeep and training, rejoined the 7th Fleet at Yokosuka as flagship on 11 October 1954. Helena spent much of her time in waters off Taiwan. The highlights of Helena's service during this tour of duty came in February 1955 during the evacuation of the Dachen Islands. These off-shore islands posed a possible point of contention between the Nationalist and Communist Chinese; and it was determined to neutralize them by means of evacuation. On 6 February came the "execute" from President Eisenhower, and the fleet, led by Helena, got underway. By 1500 on 9 February 1955, with Helena on watchful patrol, all civilians had been removed to safety from the islands—a total of 18,000 people. Early on 12 February the remaining 20,000 Nationalist troops were removed and, as Helena steamed on rear guard patrol, the Task Force sailed south.

After 6 months' training in home waters, Helena again sailed for Yokosuka, arriving on 25 January 1956. During the 6 months of this tour of duty, she once more operated primarily in the Taiwan area and briefly in Philippine waters on exercises. She returned to Long Beach on 8 July. While there alterations were performed replacing her fore and aft masts and enclosing her navigation and flag bridges.

Exercises, which included firing of the Regulus I missile from Helena's launching gear, continued for 9 months, and then she headed for another Far East tour on 10 April 1957. During the ensuing tour of duty, she played her flagship role fully, combining sea power and diplomacy.

Helena returned to Long Beach on 19 October. Following a major overhaul completed on 31 March 1958 and intensive training, including missile launching, she again sailed west.

Helena's 1958 cruise in the Far East began on 3 August. Her first port of call was Keelung, Taiwan, arriving on 21 August. On the next day, students and faculty of the Taiwan National Defense College were received on board for a tour of the ship. Her schedule next called for a visit to Manila, but the crisis brought on by the Chinese Communist shelling of the off-shore islands of Quemoy and Matsu governed by the Nationalists interrupted normal operations.

During the next weeks, Helena patrolled the area. On 7 September she steamed to within 10 miles (16 km) of mainland China, covering Chinese Nationalist supply ships replenishing Quemoy Island.

On 9 October 1958, while off the Philippines, word flashed to Helena to proceed to the aid of a stricken merchant vessel of Norwegian registry, the Hoi Wong, which had run aground on Bombay Reef in the Paracel Islands. Helena reached the scene at 1000, on 10 October 1958. Her helicopters rescued men, women and children, whom she transported to Hong Kong. Her men had skillfully and courageously carried out a difficult humanitarian mission, another contribution to strengthening American relationships with Asian nations. Helena resumed patrol and readiness operations until her return to Long Beach on 17 February 1959.

=== 1960s ===
On 5 January 1960 Helena departed for the Western Pacific in company with USS Yorktown and her escort of Destroyer Squadron 23. Visits to Korea and to Taiwan prefaced her participation in Operation Blue Star, one of the largest peacetime amphibious exercises in our history.

After a period in Japan, Helena sailed with USS Ranger and Saint Paul to Guam. On 24 April 1960, Helena, in company with destroyers USS Taylor and USS Jenkins, set sail for Australia. She then returned to Long Beach and from June until November underwent extensive overhaul. In mid-January 1961 she became the permanent flagship of Commander, 1st Fleet.

On 17 May 1961, led by the Helena, 12 1st Fleet ships put on a firepower demonstration for more than 700 members of the American Ordnance Association. In June, Helena, with eight guests of the Secretary of the Navy on board, cruised to Portland, Oregon, for the Rose Festival.

During the next months, Helena joined in Exercise Tail Wind, rendezvousing with the cruiser Los Angeles, the guided missile frigate Coontz and their destroyer escort to form the largest "Fleet Sail" in 4 years. Helena visited major ports of the Far East, rode out Typhoon Olga off Hong Kong, then returned to San Diego, California, on 6 October, soon to participate in Exercise Covered Wagon. During the remainder of the year, Helena participated in a major fleet demonstration observed by the Chief of Naval Operations, Admiral George W. Anderson. Her last operation of the year was Exercise "Black Bear."

During 1961 and 1962, Helena, operated in United States West Coast and western Pacific waters, taking part in several amphibious operations with ships of the 1st Fleet and elements of the 1st Marine Division and 3rd Marine Air Wing. Helena embarked foreign and staff officers from the Naval War College in March 1962, and two groups of Navy League members engaged in orientation cruises in June and August.

As 1962 ended, Helena was scheduled for inactivation at Long Beach Naval Shipyard. On 18 March 1963, Commander 1st Fleet shifted his flag to Saint Paul.

She appeared as a search/recovery vessel in the 1963 movie A Ticklish Affair.

=== Decommissioning ===
Helena was placed out of commission in reserve on 29 June 1963, after serving (just two months shy of) 18 continuous years of service. Helena was transferred on 30 June 1963 to San Diego Group Pacific Reserve Fleet. Stricken on 1 January 1974, and sold to Levin Metals Co., San Jose, Calif., on 13 November 1974, and scrapped in Richmond, Calif the following year.

== Awards ==
For her service in the Korean War, Helena was presented the Presidential Unit Citation of the Republic of Korea and the Korean Service Medal with four stars.

== Legacy ==
Helena's ship's bell, her anchor chain, and one of her propellers are located in downtown Helena, Montana, on the grounds of the Walking Mall, outside the Lewis & Clark County Library.

Boilers from the Helena continue to be used in the ArcJet Complex at NASA Ames Research Center to operate a large steam injection vacuum pump system.
