= Albany-class cruiser =

US Navy cruiser class

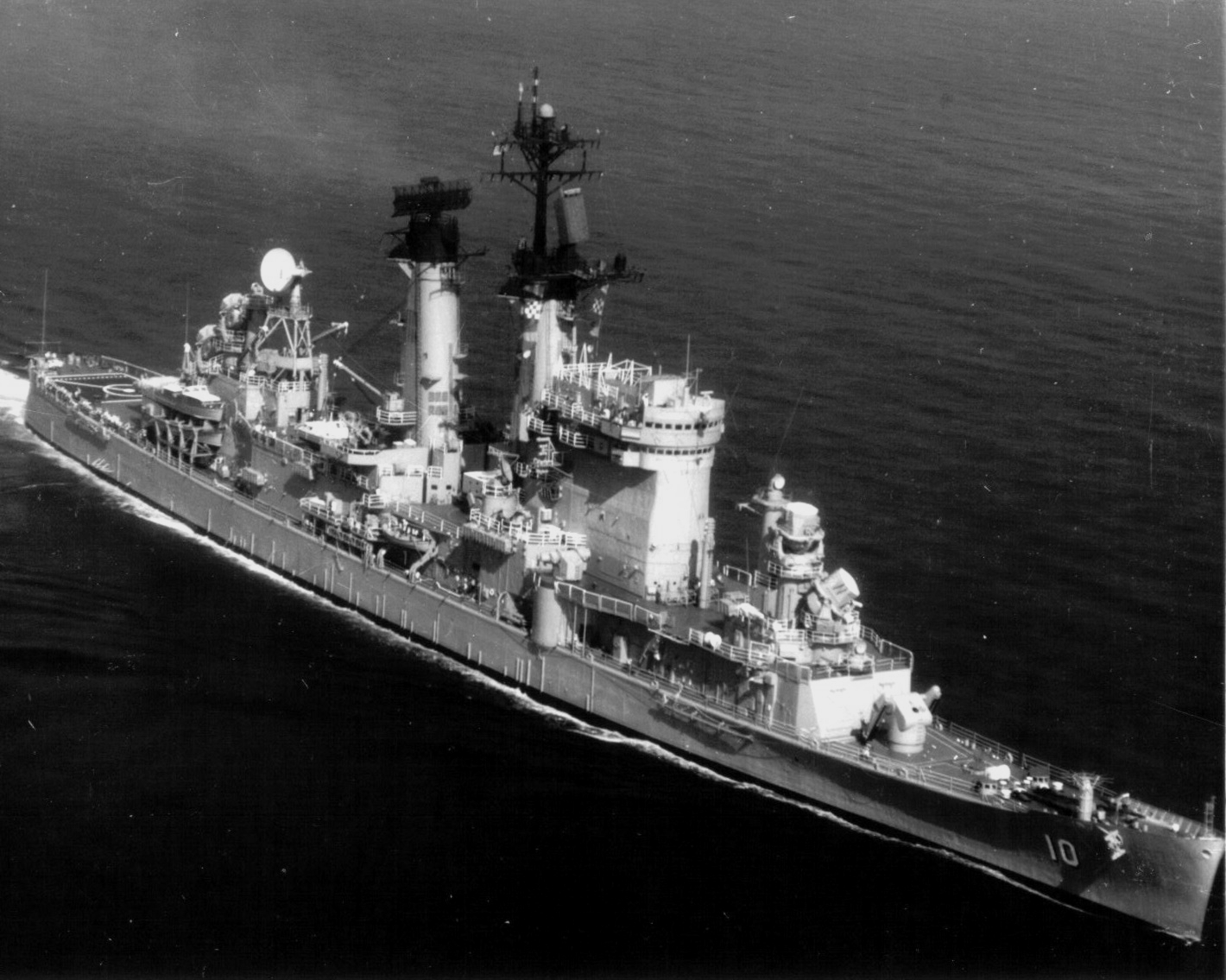
- USS Albany, lead ship of her class

Class overview
- Builders: Boston Navy Yard, MA (1); San Francisco Naval Shipyard, CA (1); Puget Sound Naval Shipyard, WA (1)
- Operators: United States Navy
- Preceded by: Long Beach class
- Succeeded by: Leahy class
- Built: 1959–1964 (conversions)
- In commission: 1962–1980
- Planned: 5
- Completed: 3
- Retired: 3
- Preserved: 0 (Anchor of USS Chicago preserved at Navy Pier)

General characteristics
- Type: Guided-missile cruiser
- Displacement: 13,700 tons std, 17,500 tons full load
- Length: 664 ft (202 m) waterline, 674 ft (205 m) overall
- Beam: 70 ft (21 m)
- Draft: 30 ft (9.1 m)
- Propulsion: four Babcock & Wilcox boilers, four General Electric geared turbines, 120,000 shaft horsepower, w. four shafts
- Speed: 32 kn (59 km/h)
- Complement: 1,222 (72 officers, 1,150 enlisted men)
- Sensors & processing systems: AN/SPS-48 3D air search radar, AN/SPS-43, AN/SPS-30, AN/SPS-10 surface search radar, AN/SPG-49 fire control radar for Talos, AN/SPG-51 fire control radar for Tartar, AN/SQS-23 bow mounted sonar
- Armament: 2 × Mk 12 twin RIM-8 Talos SAM launchers (104 missiles); 2 × Mk 11 twin RIM-24 Tartar SAM launchers (84 missiles); 1 × Mk 112 ASROC octuple-tube missile launcher; 2 × 5 in (127 mm) gun; 2 × triple Mk-32 torpedo tubes
- Aviation facilities: Flight deck only

The Albany-class guided-missile cruisers were converted Baltimore and Oregon City-class heavy cruisers of the United States Navy. All original superstructure and weapons were removed and replaced under project SCB 172. The converted ships had new very high superstructures and relied heavily on aluminum to save weight.

== Class description ==
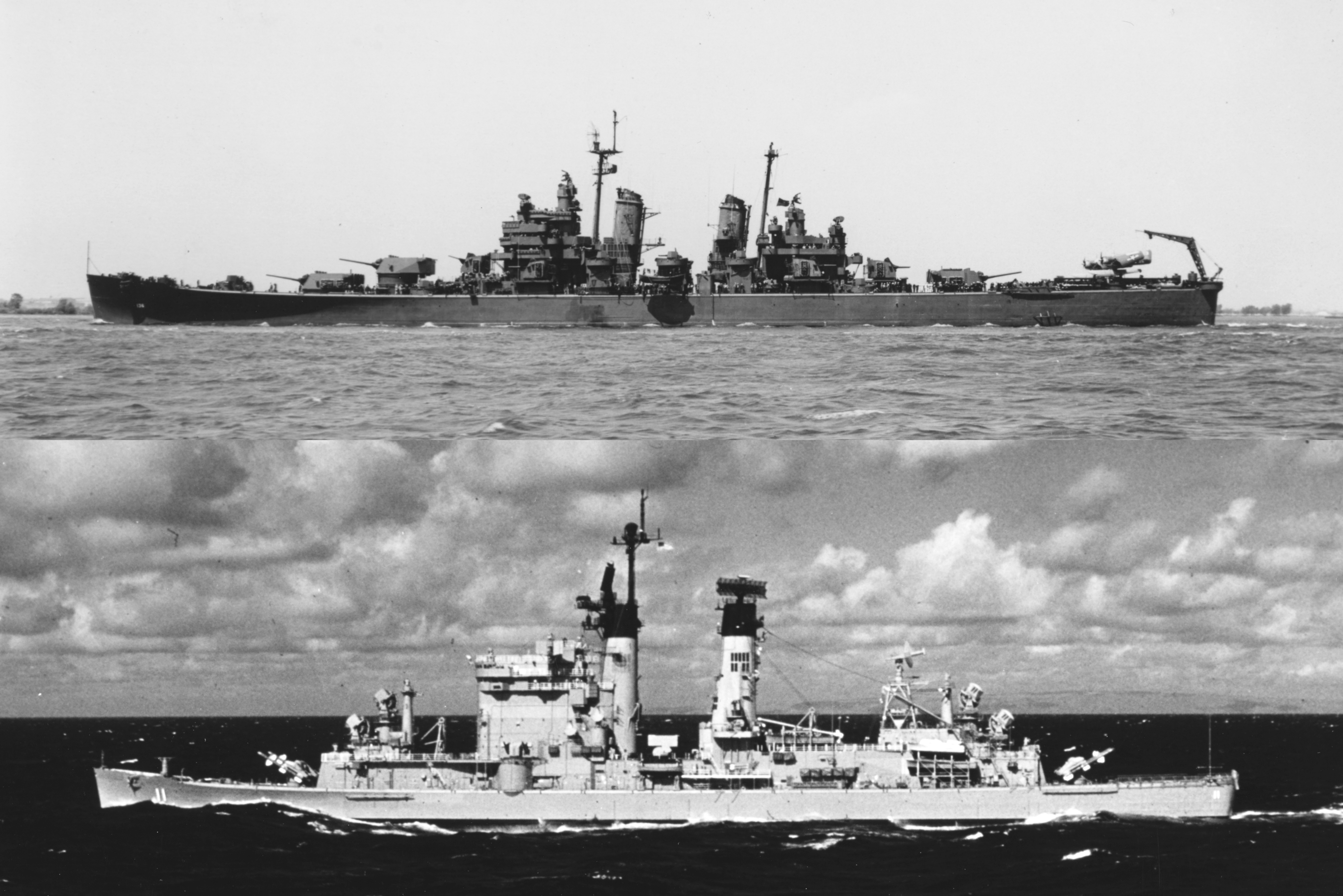
Chicago before and after her conversion.

The conversion was extensive, stripping the ships down to their hulls, removing all armament and the ship's superstructure. USS Albany (CA-123), an Oregon City-class cruiser, was converted at Boston Naval Shipyard starting in January 1959 and recommissioned as CG-10 on November 3, 1962. USS Chicago (CA-136), a Baltimore-class cruiser, was converted at San Francisco Naval Shipyard starting in July 1959 and was recommissioned as CG-11 on May 2, 1964. USS Fall River (CA-131) was originally slated to be CG-12, but USS Columbus (CA-74) was converted instead. Columbus was converted at Puget Sound Naval Shipyard beginning in September 1959 and recommissioning as CG-12 on December 1, 1962. USS Rochester (CA-124) and USS Bremerton (CA-130) were also proposed for conversion to CG-13 and CG-14, but those plans were dropped because of the high cost of the conversion and capabilities of newer guided-missile frigates.

== Weapons and systems ==
The weapon systems carried included the Mk 77 missile fire-control system with four AN/SPG-49 fire-control radars and two Mk 12 twin launchers for their armament of 104 Talos long-range surface-to-air missiles, one forward and one aft. These cruisers also carried an armament of 84 shorter-ranged Tartar missiles launched from two Mk 11 twin launchers, one to the port of and one to the starboard of the cruiser's main superstructure. The Tartar missiles were controlled by the Mk 74 missile fire-control system with four AN/SPG-51 fire-control radars. Some space was allocated on these cruisers amidships abaft the after stack for the possible installation of eight Polaris missiles, but the concept to add these ballistic missiles was dropped in mid-1959.

For anti-submarine warfare (ASW), one eight-cell Mk 112 "matchbox" ASROC missile launcher was installed amidships on each of these cruisers, located between their two stacks. Also for ASW purposes, two triple Mk 32 torpedo tubes for the Mk 46 ASW torpedo were installed.

These cruisers were initially converted into all-missile warships with no naval guns, but later on, two open-mount Mk 24 5-inch (127 mm) 38 calibre guns were added to the port side and the starboard side, near their aft exhaust stacks.

In the late 1960s Chicago and Albany underwent major engineering overhauls under SCB 002 and both the missile systems (Talos and Tartar) had new digital fire control system upgrades to handle the increasing threat from Soviet Navy anti-ship cruise missiles and aircraft, although Chicago did not receive all of the changes that Albany received. Columbus did not receive these missile system upgrades due to lack of funding, and would be decommissioned in 1976. The Talos system was deactivated on the Albany class (leaving them with the Tartar as the only SAM system operational) and all other ships in the fleet that carried it during 1976.

In late 1979 the two surviving ships (Chicago and Albany) were scheduled for massive overhauls. SM-1 (MR) missiles (which were to replace the Tartar system), as well as two Phalanx CIWS and two four-cell Harpoon missile launchers were planned to be installed, as well as a major refitting of the ships' machinery, structure, and electronics. The funding appropriated for this work was diverted, however, to other ships and both cruisers were finally decommissioned in 1980.

== Service history ==
All three ships served extensively through the 1960s and 1970s with Chicago being a long time flagship for the Third Fleet in the Pacific, and Albany serving likewise as the Second Fleet flagship in the Western Atlantic and as the Sixth Fleet flagship in the Mediterranean. Columbus did not receive the extensive Talos fire-control upgrades and extensive refits that the other two ships received in the late 1960s, though she did receive engineering overhauls to allow her to remain active until she was decommissioned early in 1976, and then immediately sold for scrap. Albany and Chicago remained in service until 1980, and while funding for massive overhauls for both was appropriated for 1979, the funds were diverted to other projects, and both ships were laid up in the summer of 1980. Both were retained in the reserve fleet and received minimal preservation until 1990 when they were both sold for scrap.

== Ships in class ==
Ship Name	Hull No.	Converted at	Commissioned	Decommissioned	Fate	Link
Albany	CG-10	Boston Naval Shipyard	3 November 1962	29 August 1980	Disposed of, sold by DRMS for scrapping, 08/12/1990	NVR DANFS
Chicago	CG-11	San Francisco Naval Shipyard	2 May 1964	1 March 1980	Disposed of, sold by DRMS for scrapping, 10/24/1991	NVR DANFS
Columbus	CG-12	Puget Sound Naval Shipyard	1 December 1962	31 January 1975	Disposed of, sold by DRMS for scrapping, 11/01/1977	NVR DANFS

== Gallery ==
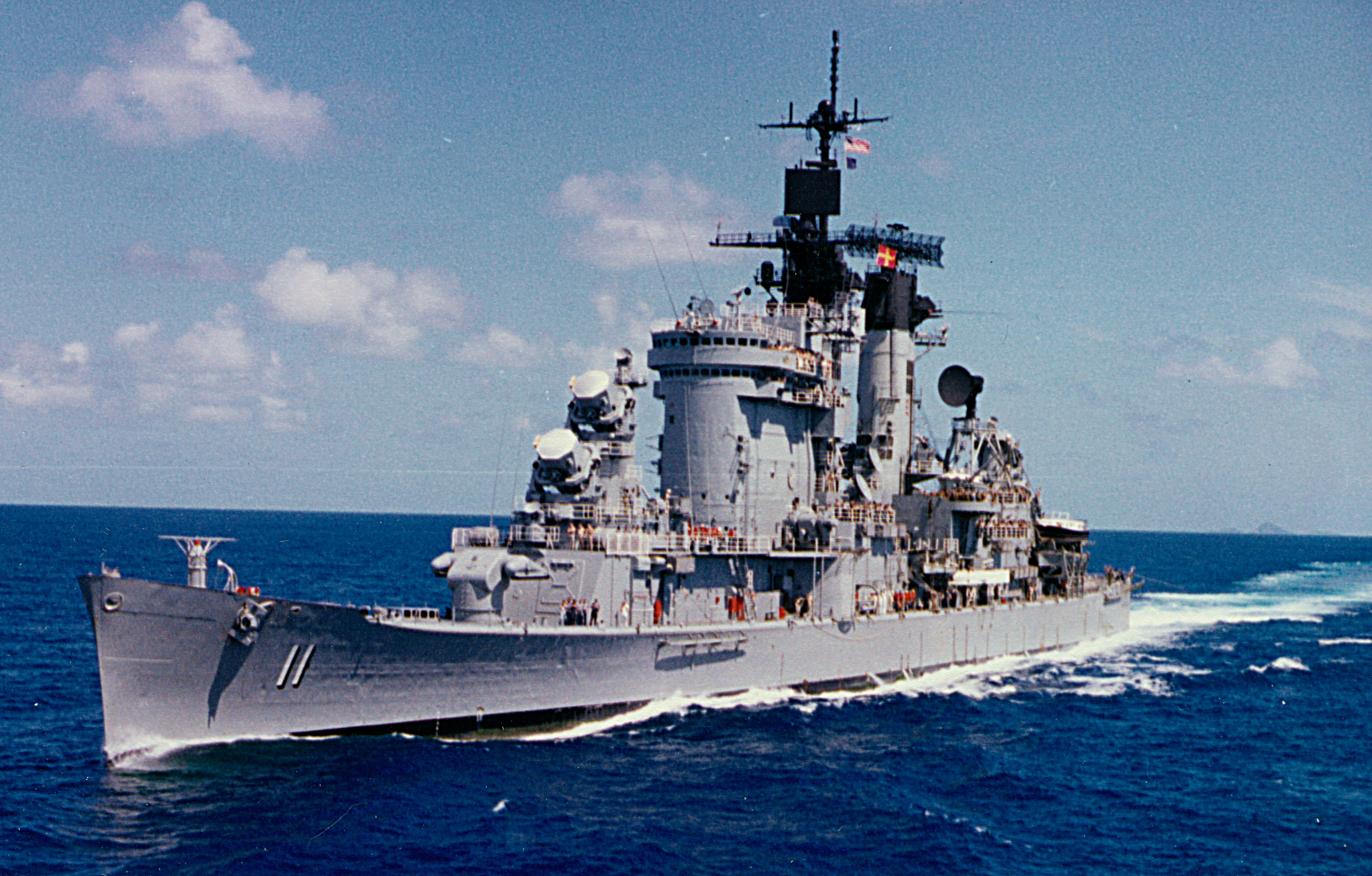
Chicago under way in the Coral Sea in 1979 showing the forward AN/SPG-49 radar scanners and Mk 12 SAM launcher

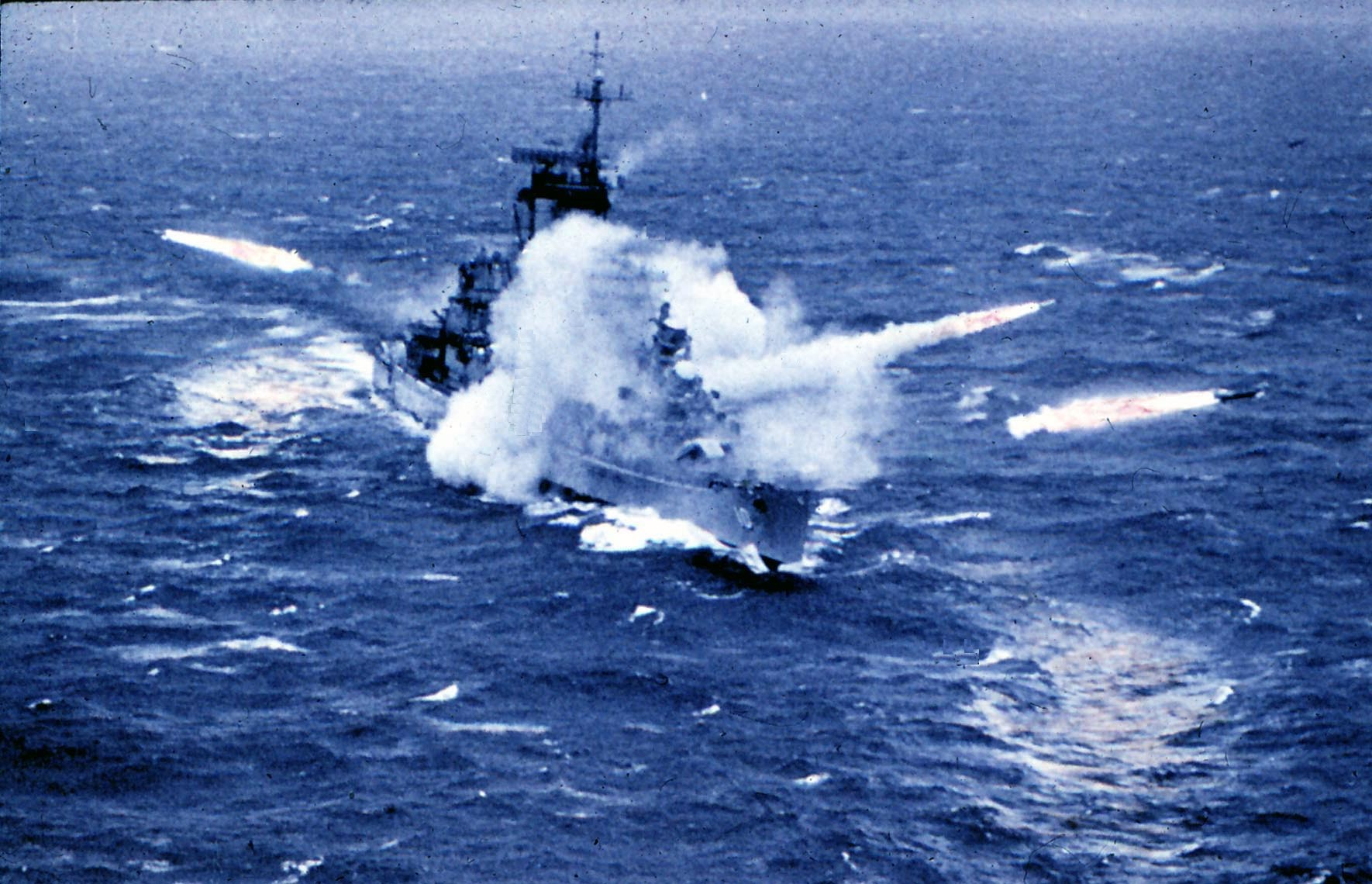
Albany firing Talos and Tartar missiles, 1963

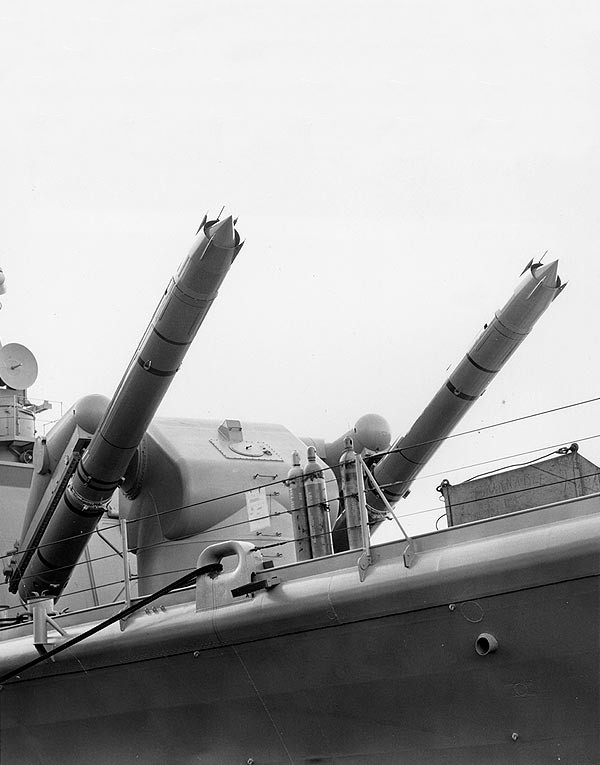
Talos launcher on Columbus, 1962

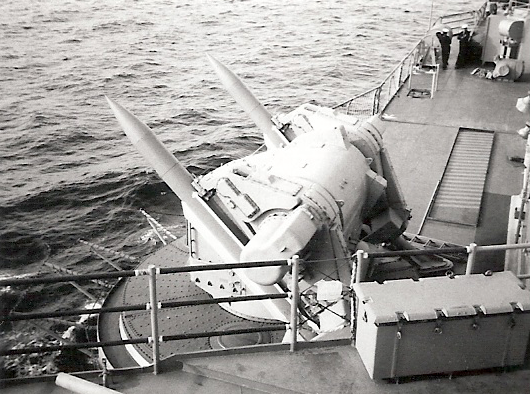
RIM-24 Tartar launcher on Chicago, 1970

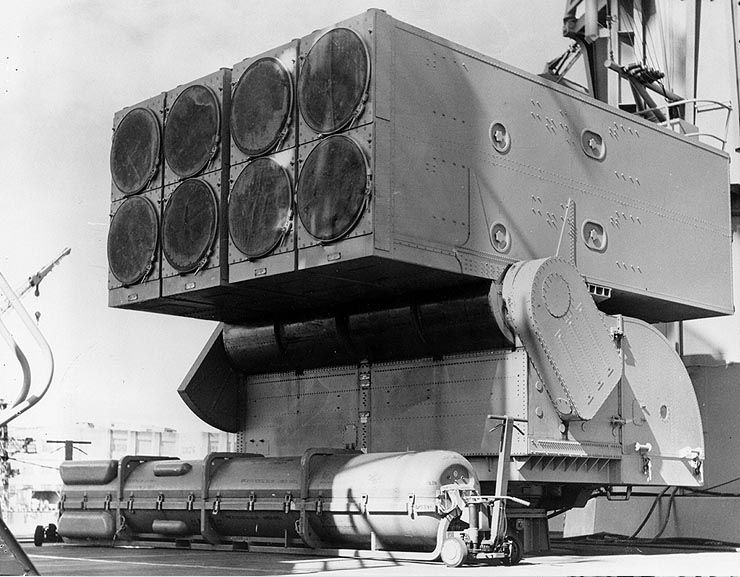
USS Columbus' 8-tube Mk 112 ASROC, 1962

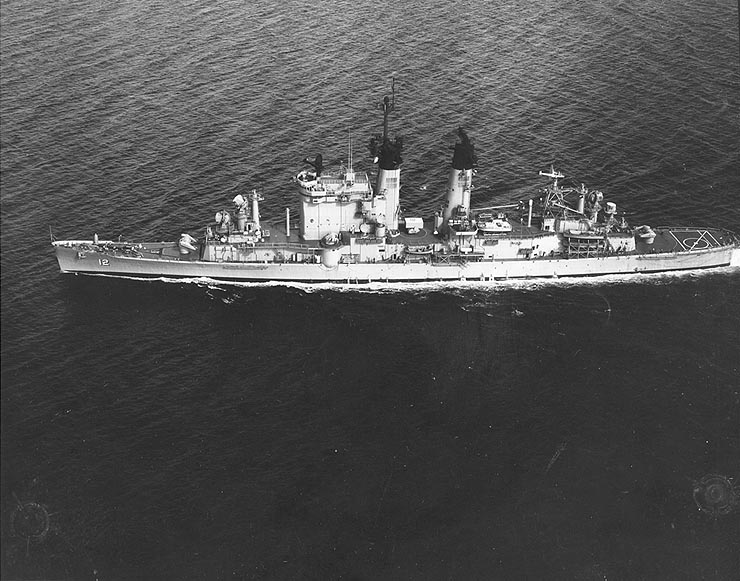
Elevated port side view of Columbus

== See also ==
- List of cruisers of the United States Navy
