= USS Bremerton (CA-130) =

Baltimore-class heavy cruiser

Coordinates: 47.5631883°N 122.6265155°W

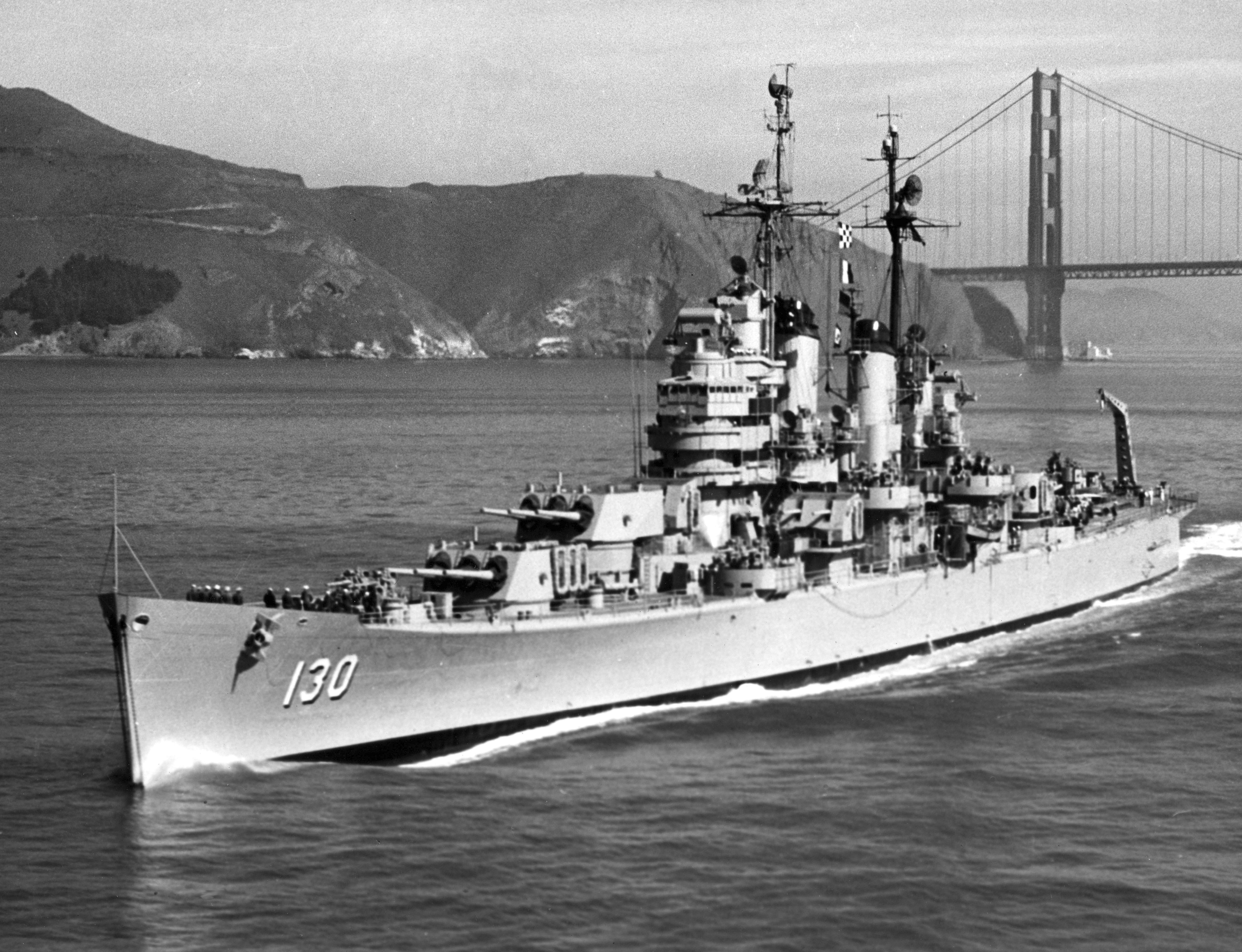
- USS Bremerton off San Francisco, in 1955

History

United States
- Name: Bremerton
- Namesake: City of Bremerton, Washington
- Builder: New York Shipbuilding Corporation
- Laid down: 1 February 1943
- Launched: 2 July 1944
- Commissioned: 29 April 1945
- Decommissioned: 9 April 1948
- Recommissioned: 23 November 1951
- Decommissioned: 29 July 1960
- Stricken: 1 October 1973
- Identification: Callsign: NTEW; Hull number: CA-130
- Motto: Better Be
- Honours and awards: See Awards
- Fate: Scrapped, October 1973
- Notes: Bell at the Bremerton Naval Shipyard Museum
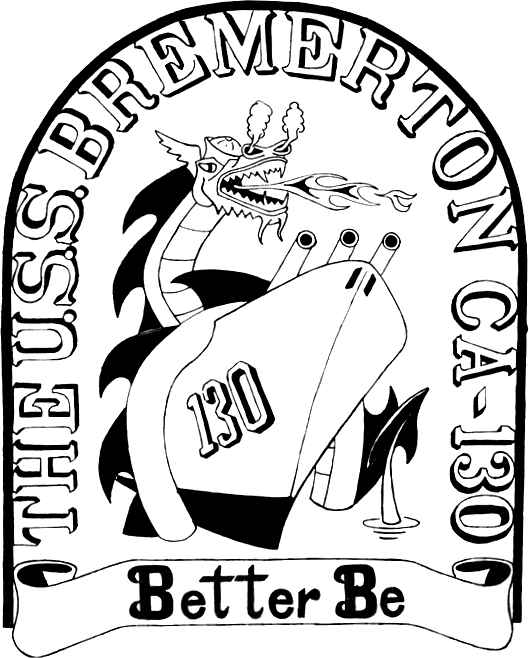
- Badge

General characteristics
- Class & type: Baltimore-class heavy cruiser
- Displacement: 13,600 tons
- Length: 673 ft 5 in
- Beam: 70 ft 10 in
- Draft: 26 ft 10 in
- Speed: 33 knots
- Complement: 1042 officers and enlisted
- Armament: 9 × 8"/55 caliber guns; 12 × 5"/38 caliber guns

USS Bremerton (CA-130), was a Baltimore-class heavy cruiser, named for the city of Bremerton in Washington state.

== Construction and career ==
She was laid down by the New York Shipbuilding Corporation at Camden in New Jersey on 1 February 1943, launched on 2 July 1944 by Miss Elizabeth K. McGowan and commissioned on 29 April 1945, Captain John Boyd Mallard in command.

=== 1940s ===
Bremerton left Norfolk for her shakedown cruise in the waters off Guantanamo Bay, Cuba, 29 May 1945. Toward the end of the shakedown period she served as flagship for Admiral Jonas Ingram, Commander-in-Chief of the Atlantic Fleet, during his South American tour of inspection. She returned to the United States and engaged in experimental work at Casco Bay, Maine, from 22 July to 2 October 1945.

On 7 November 1945 she sailed to Guantanamo Bay for further training. She then proceeded to Pearl Harbor en route for duty in the 7th Fleet. Bremerton arrived at Pearl Harbor 15 December 1945 and Inchon, Korea, 4 January 1946. She operated in the Far East until 20 November 1946, when she arrived at San Pedro, Calif. She participated in type training and made one reserve training cruise off the west coast before placed out of commission in reserve at San Francisco 9 April 1948.

=== Korean War Service ===
Bremerton was recommissioned 23 November 1951. After refresher training she joined the 7th Fleet for her first cruise of the Korean War zone. Her guns blasted enemy lines at Wonsan, Kojo, Chongjin, and Changjon Hang, Korea. On 13 September 1952 she was relieved and returned to Long Beach.

Seven months were devoted to overhaul, drills, and gunnery exercises, and then on 5 April 1953 Bremerton again departed Long Beach for a tour with the 7th Fleet. Upon joining TF 77 her guns pounded enemy installations, troops, and railroads in Korea.

Completing this tour in November 1953, Bremerton returned to Long Beach and commenced a shipyard overhaul. With overhaul completed, she conducted extensive training and then departed for another tour of the Western Pacific 14 May 1954. On 4 April 1954 Commander Will P. Starnes assumed duties as Executive Officer and on 17 October 1954 Bremerton returned to Long Beach and was granted a thirty-day rest before continuing drills and gunnery exercises off Southern California coast.

=== Post Korean War ===
In January 1955, Bremerton proceeded to Mare Island Navy Yard at Vallejo, California, for her regular overhaul period. At Mare Island Bremerton underwent a thorough revamping under the Navy's high-geared program of improved habitability and fighting efficiency.

On 12 July 1955 after a rigid training period, Bremerton again sailed for duties in the Far East. On this trip to the Western Pacific, Bremerton served as the flagship for Rear Admiral D. M. Tyree, Commander Cruiser Division One, later relieved by Rear Admiral H. L. Collins. For two weeks in October she served as temporary flagship for Vice Admiral A. M. Pride, Commander Seventh Fleet, in Keelung, Formosa. During this Far Eastern tour, Bremerton participated in five operations with Task Force 77. For her operations with Nationalist Forces she earned her second China Service Medal. While in Formosa, her crew participated in the Chinese Nationalist celebration of Double Ten Day with Chiang Kai-Shek presiding.

On 10 January 1956 while the Bremerton was in Yokosuka, Commander Robert M. Brownlie assumed duties as Bremerton's Executive Officer. Then on 12 February Bremerton returned home to Long Beach, California, and on 28 February Captain Charles C. Kirkpatrick assumed command. Bremerton was awarded a white "E" and a green "E" for excellence for winning the Battle Efficiency competition among cruisers of the Pacific Fleet for the fiscal year 1956 and on 1 September 1956, Command was assumed by Captain Raymond H. Bass.

On 6 November 1956 Bremerton left her home port of Long Beach for the Orient once more, but this time going via Melbourne, Australia and the XVI Olympiad. Besides Australia, Bremerton visited Redondo Beach, Monterey, Victoria, British Columbia, Seattle, Pearl Harbor, Guam, Kwajalein Atoll, the Japanese ports of Yokosuka, Kobe, Beppu, Okinawa, Keelung, Formosa, Kaohsiung, Taiwan, the cities Manila and Olongapo in the Philippines, Hong Kong and Dingalon Bay. Bremerton returned to Long Beach in May 1957. Around this time she was selected for conversion to the Albany class guided missile cruiser CG-14, but funding was deleted from the Navy's budget. She continued on in service for a few more years after the conversion was cancelled.

=== Decommissioning ===
Bremerton was scheduled to undergo a major conversion to become one of the planned Albany-class guided missile cruisers, with the ship allocated the new number CG-14. However, the cost of this process, along with the similar conversion of Rochester, was deemed too high, and so was cancelled. Bremerton was decommissioned on 29 July 1960 after serving a total of 11.5 years in commissioned service. She lingered in the mothball fleet but was stricken from the Naval Vessel Register on 1 October 1973, along with several of her sister ships. Sold to Zidell Explorations Corp., Portland Oregon on 11 July 1974.

== Awards ==
- American Campaign Medal
- World War II Victory Medal
- Navy Occupation Medal
- China Service Medal
- National Defense Service Medal
- Korean Service Medal with two battle stars
- United Nations Korea Medal
