= USS Macon (CA-132) =

Baltimore-class heavy cruiser

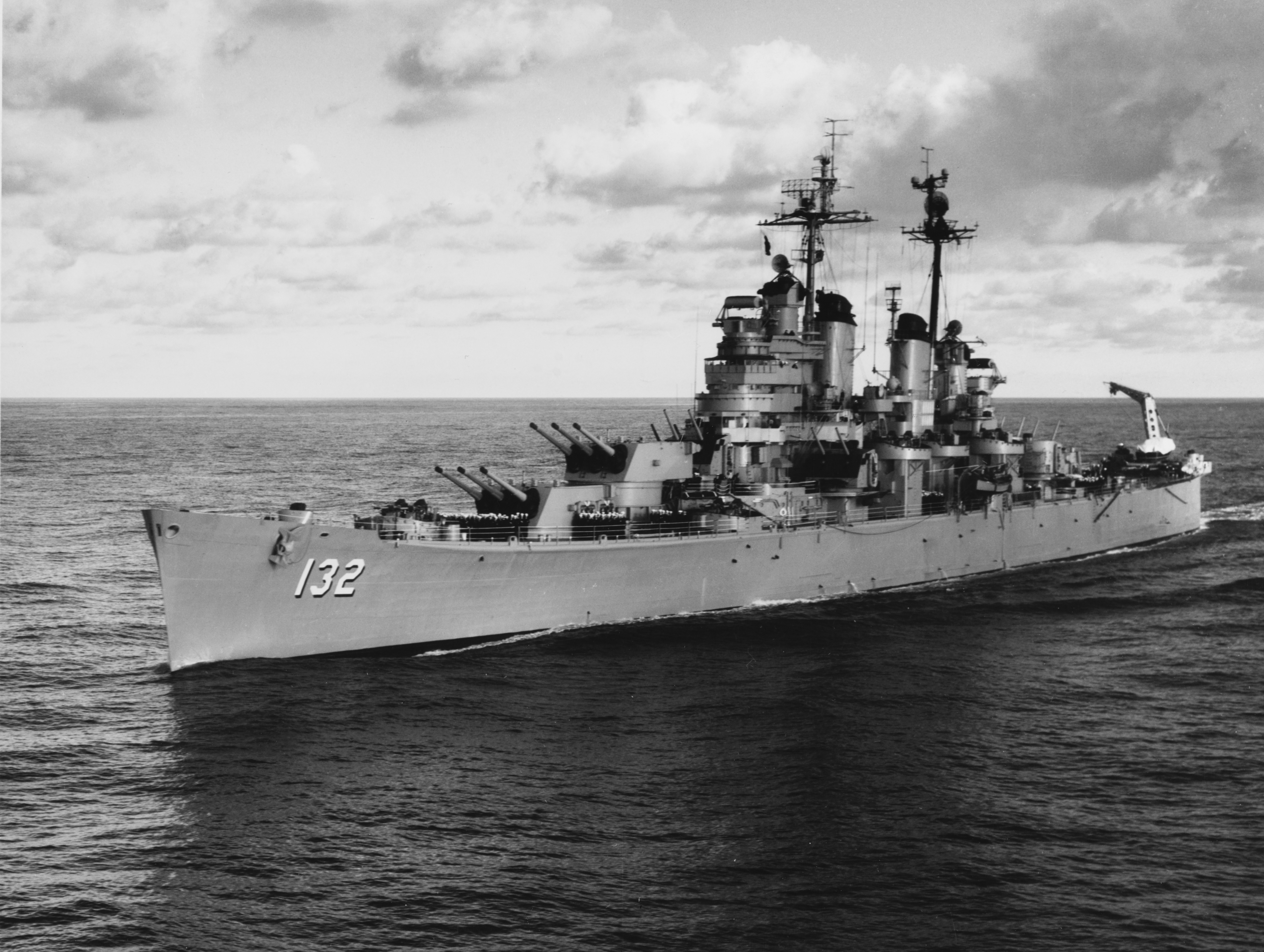
- USS Macon underway on 6 October 1951

History

United States
- Name: Macon
- Namesake: City of Macon, Georgia
- Builder: New York Shipbuilding
- Laid down: 14 June 1943
- Launched: 15 October 1944
- Commissioned: 26 August 1945
- Decommissioned: 12 April 1950
- Recommissioned: 16 October 1950
- Decommissioned: 10 March 1961
- Stricken: 1 November 1969
- Identification: Callsign: NKEC; Hull number:CA-132
- Motto: Constitution, Justice, Wisdom, Moderation
- Fate: Scrapped, 5 July 1973
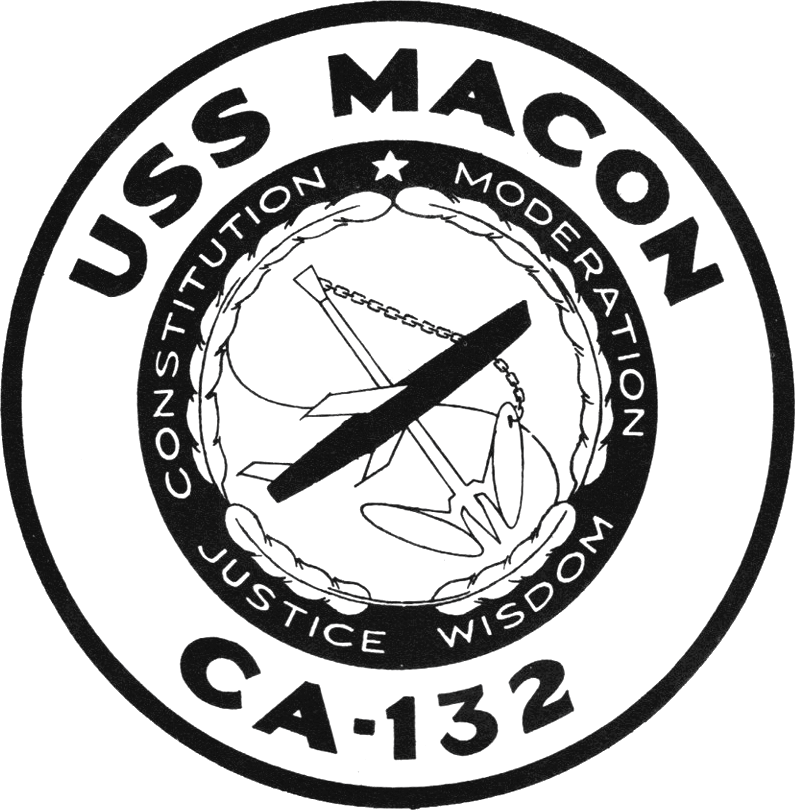
- Badge

General characteristics
- Class & type: Baltimore-class cruiser
- Displacement: 13,600 long tons (13,818 t)
- Length: 674 ft 11 in (205.71 m)
- Beam: 70 ft 10 in (21.59 m)
- Draft: 20 ft 6 in (6.25 m)
- Speed: 33 knots (61 km/h; 38 mph)
- Complement: 1,142 officers and enlisted
- Armament: 9 × 8"/55 caliber guns (3×3); 12 × 5"/38 caliber guns (6×2); 46 × Bofors 40 mm guns; 28 × Oerlikon 20 mm cannons

USS Macon (CA-132), a Baltimore-class heavy cruiser of the United States Navy, was laid down on 14 June 1943 by the New York Shipbuilding Corp., Camden, New Jersey; launched on 15 October 1944; sponsored by Mrs. Charles F. Bowden, wife of the mayor of Macon, Georgia; and commissioned on 26 August 1945 at Philadelphia, Captain Edward Everett Pare in command.

== 1946 – 1950 ==
Macon's first fleet assignment was with the 8th Fleet, which she joined soon after her shakedown cruise. Sailing with the fleet for maneuvers in the Caribbean, she departed Norfolk on 19 April 1946, returning to New York City on 7 May. On 4 June Macon arrived at Norfolk for duty as a test ship for the operational development force.

Over the next four years the cruiser periodically received experimental equipment in the Philadelphia Naval Shipyard, conducted tests of the new equipment while she served as an anti-aircraft gunnery schoolship, and training naval reservists off the Atlantic and Gulf coasts of the United States. She also participated in a midshipmen summer cruise to Europe in 1948. Her experimental duties continued until 12 April 1950 when she decommissioned and went into reserve at Philadelphia.

== 1950 – 1961 ==
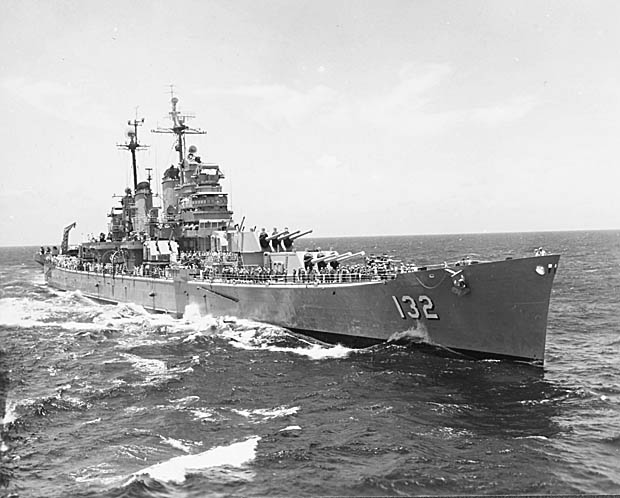
Macon in the Mediterranean, 1953

With the outbreak of the Korean War in June 1950, Macon was ordered reactivated. As she had just entered into a decommissioned status in April (3 months earlier) her reactivation went extremely quickly, and in reality consisted of minor repairs, loading a crew, stores, and ammunition. She recommissioned at Philadelphia 16 October 1950, Capt. Victor Dismukes Long in command and, upon completion of refresher training, became the flagship of Cruiser Division 6 in the Atlantic. She patrolled in the eastern Mediterranean during the Suez Crisis of 1956; took part in the International Naval Review celebrating the 350th Anniversary of the foundation of Jamestown, Virginia, 12 June 1957; and participated in the NATO exercise operation "Strikeback", conducted in the North Sea and Arctic Ocean in September 1957.

Besides these duties, Macon continued to receive experimental equipment for testing throughout the period. Having also received missile equipment during January–March 1956, she launched the first Regulus missile from an Atlantic Fleet cruiser on 8 May while anchored off the North Carolina coast, and then continued tests of the missile as she completed her cycle of Atlantic Fleet operations. On the night of 19–20 January 1959, Macon, steaming from Cartagena to Marseille, diverted from her course and sped to the aid of burning Italian merchant ship Maria Amata. Macon's crew fought the flames, but the ship was soon beyond salvage. Macon then carried the merchantman's crew to Valencia, Spain.

Macon participated in Operation Inland Seas, which was a United States Navy operation to celebrate the completion of the Saint Lawrence Seaway in 1959. By the end of 1959 Macon had conducted six midshipmen summer cruises and had spent the fall and winter season of almost every year with the 6th Fleet.

The following January, Macon, carrying the U.S. Navy Band, departed Norfolk for a goodwill cruise to South American ports. While on this tour, 19 members of the band perished in a plane crash en route to perform at a state dinner for Brazilian President Juscelino Kubitschek. With Argentine Naval personnel participating, Macon's crew held memorial services in Buenos Aires Harbor on 28 February. Completing this cruise at Rio de Janeiro on 10 March, Macon returned to Boston to resume her cycle of operations with the Atlantic Fleet.

Macon was placed out of commission in reserve at Philadelphia on 10 March 1961. Stricken on 1 November 1969, and sold to the Union Minerals and Alloys Corporation, New York City, on 5 July 1973 and scrapped in Port Newark, New Jersey.
