= Baltimore-class cruiser =

Class of US Navy heavy cruisers

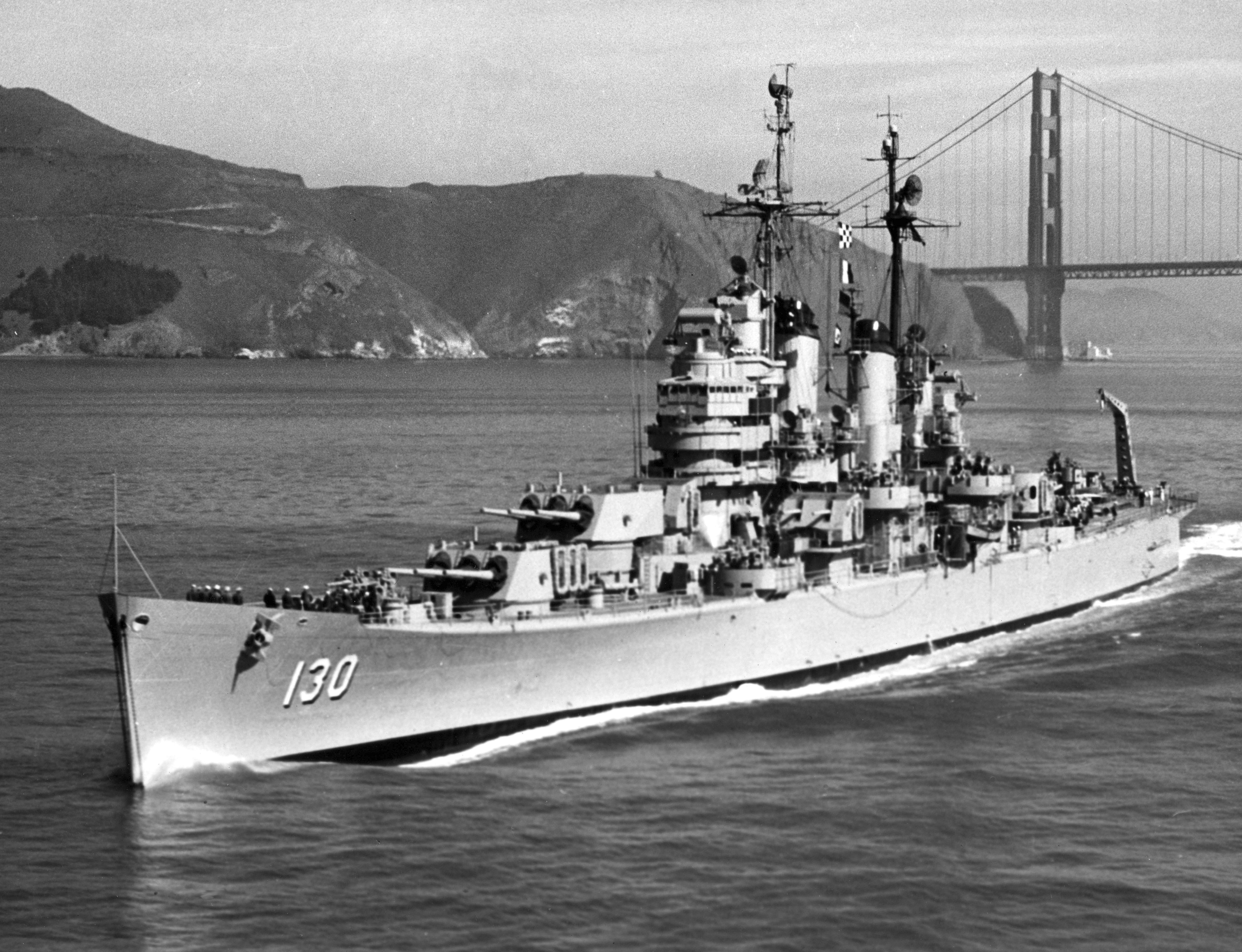
- USS Bremerton (CA-130) in 1955

Class overview
- Name: Baltimore class
- Builders: Bethlehem, Fore River, MA (8); New York Ship, NJ (4); Philadelphia Naval Shipyard, PA (2)
- Operators: United States Navy
- Preceded by: USS Wichita
- Succeeded by: Oregon City class
- Subclasses: Boston class; Albany class
- Cost: US$40 million per ship
- Built: 1941–1945
- In commission: 1943–1971
- Planned: 14
- Completed: 14
- Retired: 14
- Scrapped: 14

General characteristics
- Type: Heavy cruiser
- Displacement: 13,600 long tons (13,818 t) standard; 17,000 long tons (17,273 t) full load
- Length: 664 ft (202 m) wl; 673 ft 5 in (205.26 m) oa
- Beam: 70 ft 10 in (21.59 m)
- Height: 112 ft 10 in (34.39 m) (mast)
- Draft: 26 ft 10 in (8.18 m)
- Installed power: 4 × Babcock & Wilcox boilers; 120,000 shp (89,000 kW)
- Propulsion: 4 screws; 4 steam turbine sets
- Speed: 33 knots (61 km/h; 38 mph)
- Boats & landing craft carried: 2 × lifeboats
- Complement: 61 officers and 1,085 sailors
- Sensors & processing systems: 2 x Mk34 GFCS; 2 × Mk37 GFCS; Early: SK-2 air-search radar; SP radar fighter-direction radar; Later: AN/SPS-6 air-search radar; AN/SPS-8A height-finding radar; AN/SPS-10 surface-search radar; AN/SPS-12 air-search radar; AN/SPS-37 early-warning radar (Saint Paul); AN/SPS-43 air-search radar (Helena); AN/URN-3 TACAN; Up to 6 x Mark 56 fire-control system
- Armament: 3 × triple 8-inch/55-caliber guns; 6 × twin 5-inch/38-caliber guns; 12 × quad Bofors 40 mm guns; 24 × single Oerlikon 20 mm cannons
- Armor: Belt armor: 4–6 in (102–152 mm); Deck: 2.5 in (64 mm); Turrets: 1.5–8 in (38–203 mm); Barbettes: 6.3 in (160 mm); Conning tower: 6.5 in (165 mm); Bulkheads: 6 in (152 mm)
- Aviation facilities: 2 × aircraft catapults; Helipad (later conversion)

The Baltimore-class heavy cruisers were a class of heavy cruisers in the United States Navy commissioned during and shortly after World War II. Fourteen Baltimores were completed, more than any other class of heavy cruiser (the British County class had 15 vessels planned, but only 13 completed), along with another three ships of the Oregon City sub-class. The Baltimores also were the first cruisers in the US Navy to be designed without the limitations of the London Naval Treaty.

Fast and heavily armed, the Baltimore cruisers were mainly used in World War II as anti-aircraft cruisers to protect the fast aircraft carriers in battle groups from air attack. Additionally, their 8-inch (203 mm) main guns and secondary 5-inch (127 mm) guns were regularly used to bombard land targets in support of amphibious landings. After the war, only six Baltimores (St. Paul, Macon, Toledo, Columbus, Bremerton, and Helena) and two Oregon City-class ships (Albany and Rochester) remained in service, while the rest were moved to the reserve fleet. However, all ships except Boston, Canberra, Chicago, and Fall River were reactivated for the Korean War.

Except for St. Paul, all the ships retaining all-gun configurations had 18 year or less service lives, and by 1971 were decommissioned, and started being sold for scrap. However, four Baltimore-class cruisers were refitted and converted into some of the first guided missile cruisers in the world, becoming two of the three Albany-class and two Boston-class cruisers. The last of these was decommissioned in 1980, with the Chicago lasting until 1991 in reserve. No example of the Baltimore class still exists.

== History ==
=== Planning and construction ===
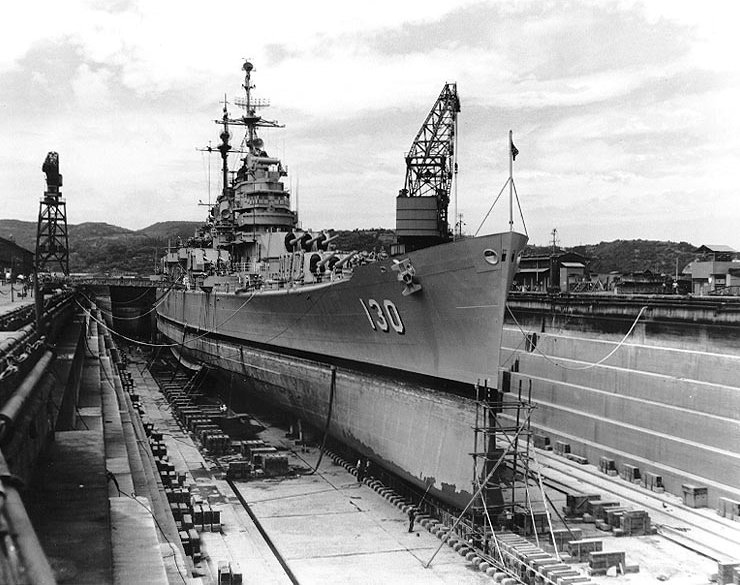
USS Bremerton in drydock

Immediately after the outbreak of World War II in September 1939, the US Navy initiated studies regarding a new class of heavy cruiser that led to construction of the Baltimore class. With the start of the war, the limitations instituted by the Second London Naval Treaty, which had completely banned the construction of heavy cruisers, became obsolete. The Baltimore class was based partly on USS Wichita, a heavy cruiser from 1937, which represented the transition from inter-war to World War II designs. It was also based partly on the Cleveland class, a light cruiser that was then being built. In profile, the Baltimores looked very much like the Cleveland-class light cruisers, the obvious difference being that the larger Baltimores carried nine 8-inch (203 mm) guns in three triple turrets, compared to the twelve 6-inch (152 mm) guns in four triple turrets of the Clevelands.

The construction of the first four ships of the Baltimore class began on 1 July 1940, and four more were ordered before the year was out. A second order, which consisted of 16 more ships, was approved on 7 August 1942. Despite the heavy losses in cruisers during the first 14 months of the Pacific War, the completion of the ships was delayed because the Navy gave priority to the construction of the lighter Cleveland-class ships, as more of the lighter ships could be completed more quickly for deployment in carrier groups. With the construction of the first eight Baltimore-class ships moving slowly, the US Navy used the time to review the initial plans and improve them. The new, modified design was itself delayed, so that construction had begun on a further six ships—for a total of 14—using the original design before the revisions were completed. The final three ships ordered were converted to the second design, known as the Oregon City class. Between 1943 and 1947, 17 ships of the Baltimore and Oregon City classes entered service. Construction of the eighteenth ship (Northampton) was suspended, to eventually be completed as a flagship/command ship in 1950. Five more were laid down but cancelled and scrapped before launch, and one was never started before being cancelled.

The largest contractor for the construction of the Baltimore-class ships was Bethlehem Steel, which produced eight ships at the Fore River Shipyard in Quincy, Massachusetts. New York Shipbuilding in Camden, New Jersey, built four and the Philadelphia Naval Shipyard in Philadelphia completed two. The ships were named after cities in the United States, the only exception being USS Canberra, which was named in honor of HMAS Canberra (sunk at the battle of Savo Island), which had been named after Canberra, the Australian capital. The classification "CA" originally stood for "armored cruiser" but was later used for heavy cruisers.

=== Service ===
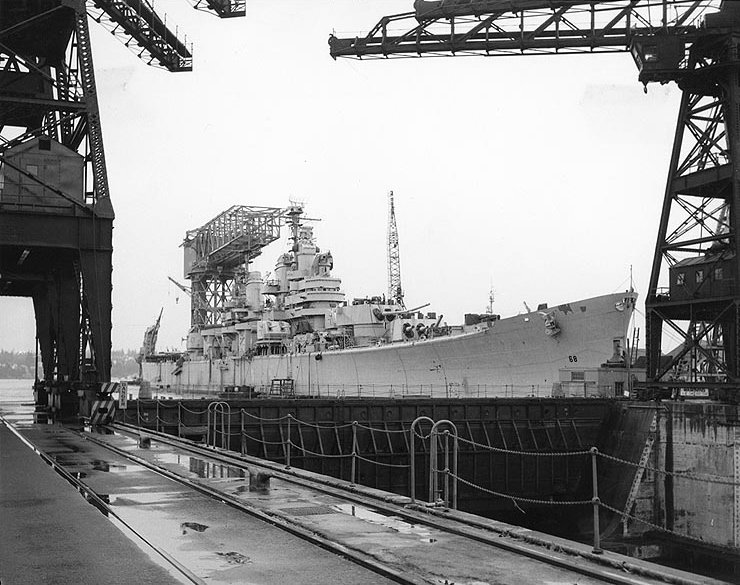
USS Baltimore during her reactivation

Of the seventeen (including the three Oregon Citys) completed ships, twelve were commissioned before the Japanese capitulation on 2 September 1945, though only seven took part in the battles of the Pacific Theater and one in the European Theater. By 1947, nine of the Baltimores had been decommissioned and placed in the reserve fleet, while seven (Helena, Toledo, Macon, Columbus, Saint Paul, Rochester, and Albany) remained in service. However, at the start of the 1950s, six were reactivated (Macon had been decommissioned for four short months: June–October 1950), making thirteen available for deployment in the Korean War. Six of these were used for escort missions and coastal bombardment in Korea, while the other seven reinforced fleets in other areas of the globe. Four ships remained out of service: the Fall River was never reactivated, the Boston and Canberra were refitted as Boston-class guided missile cruisers (CGs), and the Chicago was reactivated after being converted to an Albany-class CG.

After the Korean War ended and due to the high cost of keeping them in service; starting in 1954 with Quincy, some of the Baltimores were decommissioned for good. By 1969, only six ships were still in commission; five (Boston, Canberra, Chicago, Columbus, Albany) as CGs (guided missile cruisers), and only one unmodified ship, the Saint Paul, which remained active to serve in the Vietnam War, providing gunfire support. Saint Paul was the only member of the class to serve continuously from commissioning (serving 26 years) and was finally decommissioned in 1971. Boston and Canberra retired in 1970, Columbus (serving 29.5 years) in 1975, and finally Chicago in 1980. Starting in 1972 all fourteen of the original Baltimores were sold for scrap after being decommissioned, with Chicago being the final one broken up in 1991.

==== Damage ====
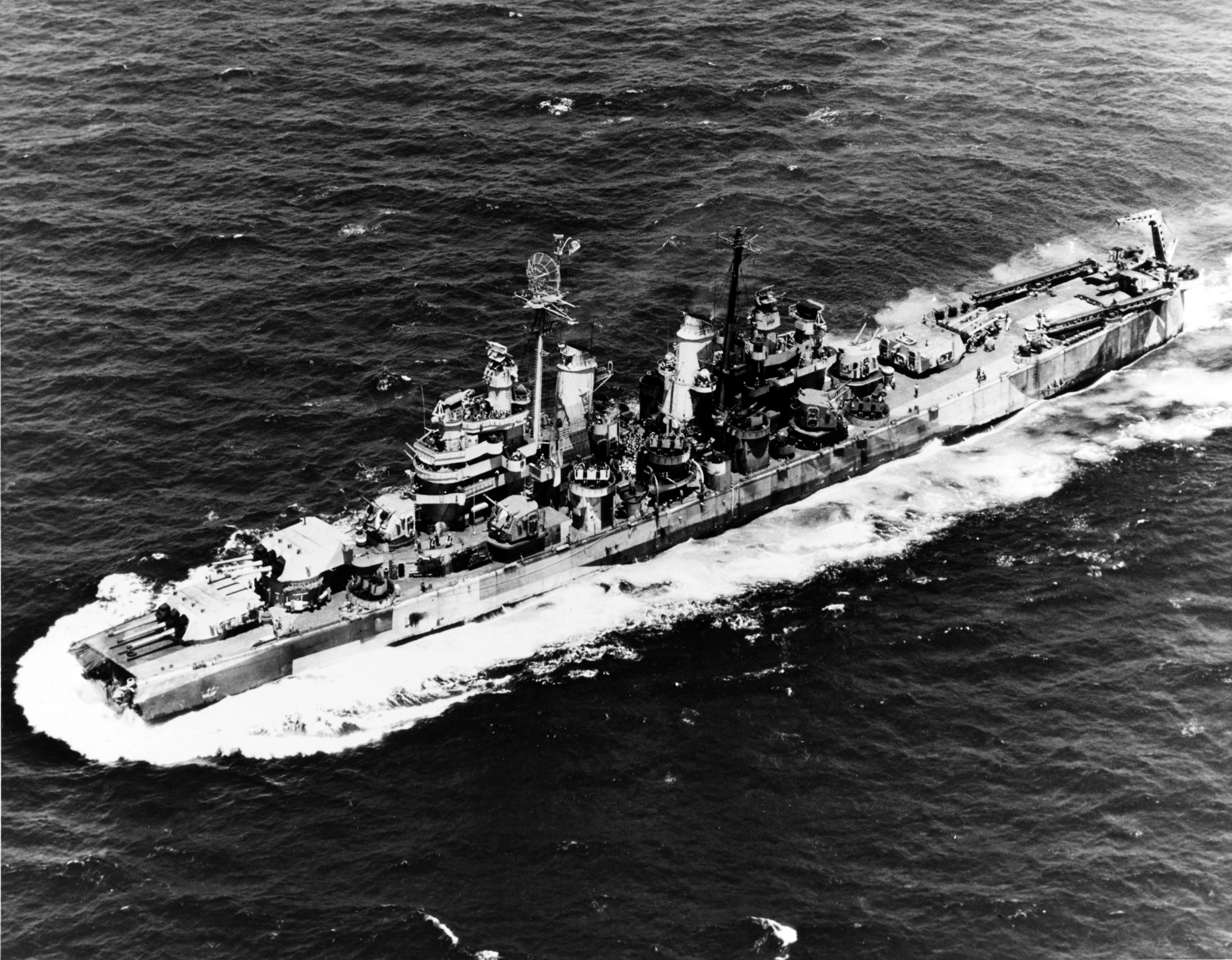
USS Pittsburgh with her bow ripped off

In World War II, only the Canberra was damaged through enemy fire, when she was struck with an air-dropped torpedo on 13 October 1944, which killed 23 men in the engine room and left the ship immobilized. The ship was hit amidships and both boiler rooms were flooded with 3,000 tons of seawater. She was towed away by sister ship Boston, and as a result, both ships missed the crucial Battle of Leyte Gulf. A year later, repairs were completed at the Boston Naval Shipyard, and Canberra was assigned to the Atlantic Fleet. In June 1945, Pittsburgh had her entire bow ripped off in a typhoon, but there were no casualties. The ship struggled through 70-knot (130 km/h; 81 mph) winds to Guam, where provisional repairs were made before sailing to the Puget Sound Naval Shipyard for a full reconstruction. Pittsburgh's detached bow stayed afloat, and it was later towed into Guam and scrapped.

During the Korean War, a fire in a forward gun turret on 12 April 1952, killed 30 men on St. Paul. Then, in 1953, the same ship was hit by a coastal battery, though without injury to the crew. Helena in 1951 and Los Angeles in 1953 were also struck by coastal batteries without injuries during the war.

In June 1968, Boston, along with its escort, the Australian destroyer HMAS Hobart, were victims of friendly fire when planes of the US Air Force mistook them for enemy targets and fired on them with AIM-7 Sparrow missiles. Only Hobart was seriously damaged; although Boston was hit, the warhead of the missile failed to detonate.

=== Missile conversions ===
By the latter half of the 1940s, the US Navy was planning and experimenting with warships equipped with guided missiles. In 1946 the battleship USS Mississippi and in 1948 the seaplane tender USS Norton Sound were converted to test this idea. Both were equipped with, among other weapons, RIM-2 Terrier missiles, which were also used after 1952 on the first series of operational missile cruisers. Two Baltimore-class cruisers were refitted in this first series, Boston and Canberra. These were the first operational guided missile cruisers in the world. They were designated the Boston class and returned to service in 1955 and 1956 respectively, reclassified as CAG-1 and CAG-2—"G" for "guided missile" and maintaining the "A" because they retained their heavy guns.

In the following years, six light cruisers of the Cleveland class were retrofitted to be equipped with guided missiles, and in 1957, the first warship designed from the start to be a missile cruiser was completed (Long Beach). Other ships also continued to be converted, so starting in 1958, two Baltimore-class cruisers, Chicago and Columbus, along with an Oregon City-class cruiser, (considered a sub-class of the Baltimore class) Albany, were converted to the new Albany class. These were recommissioned in 1962 and 1964, respectively. Two more ships were planned to be refitted as Albanys, the Baltimore class Bremerton and the Oregon City class Rochester, but these conversions were cancelled because of cost. As opposed to the Boston-class refit, the Albany-class refit required a total reconstruction. Both entire weapons systems and the superstructure were removed and replaced with new ones; the cost of one refit was $175 million. Because no high-caliber guns were retained, the Albany class ships received the designation CG rather than CAG.

In addition to the operational conversions, four Baltimore-class ships, Helena, Los Angeles, Macon, and Toledo, received modifications to operate the SSM-N-8 Regulus cruise missile between 1956 and 1958 on an experimental basis. Regulus was a nuclear-armed weapon that was primarily used by the US Navy in the nuclear deterrent role. Although associated primarily with submarines, the four Baltimore-class cruisers fitted to operate the missile undertook operational taskings with it to the Western Pacific during the experimental period.

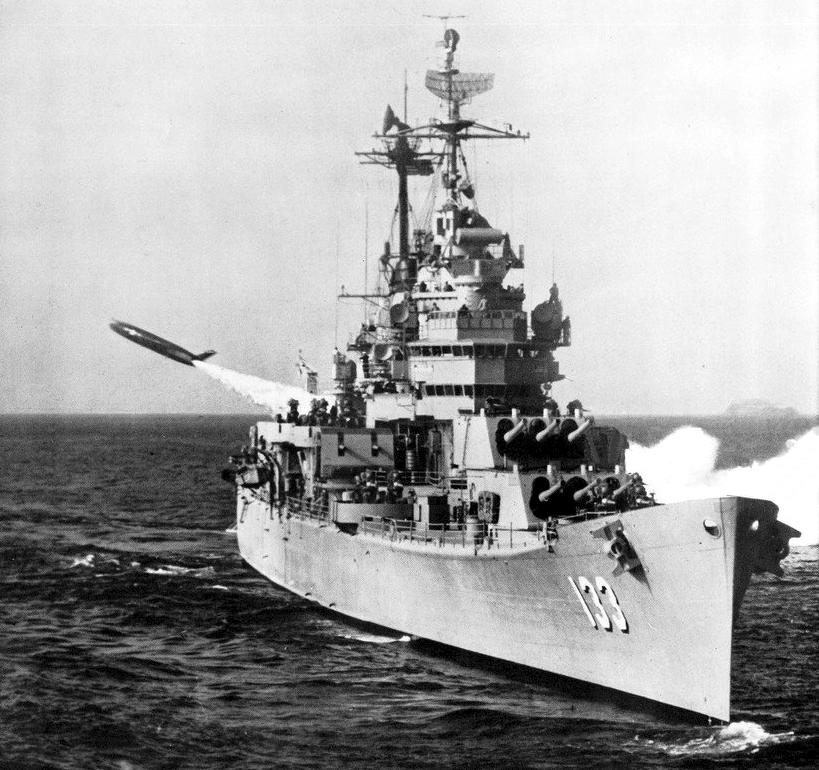
USS Toledo launches a Regulus cruise missile

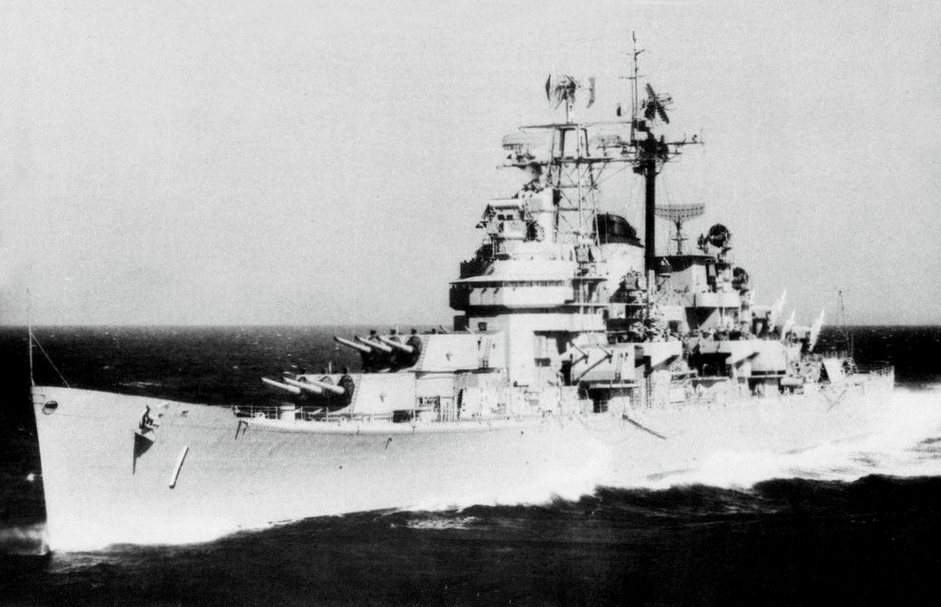
USS Boston, the first of two Boston-class conversions

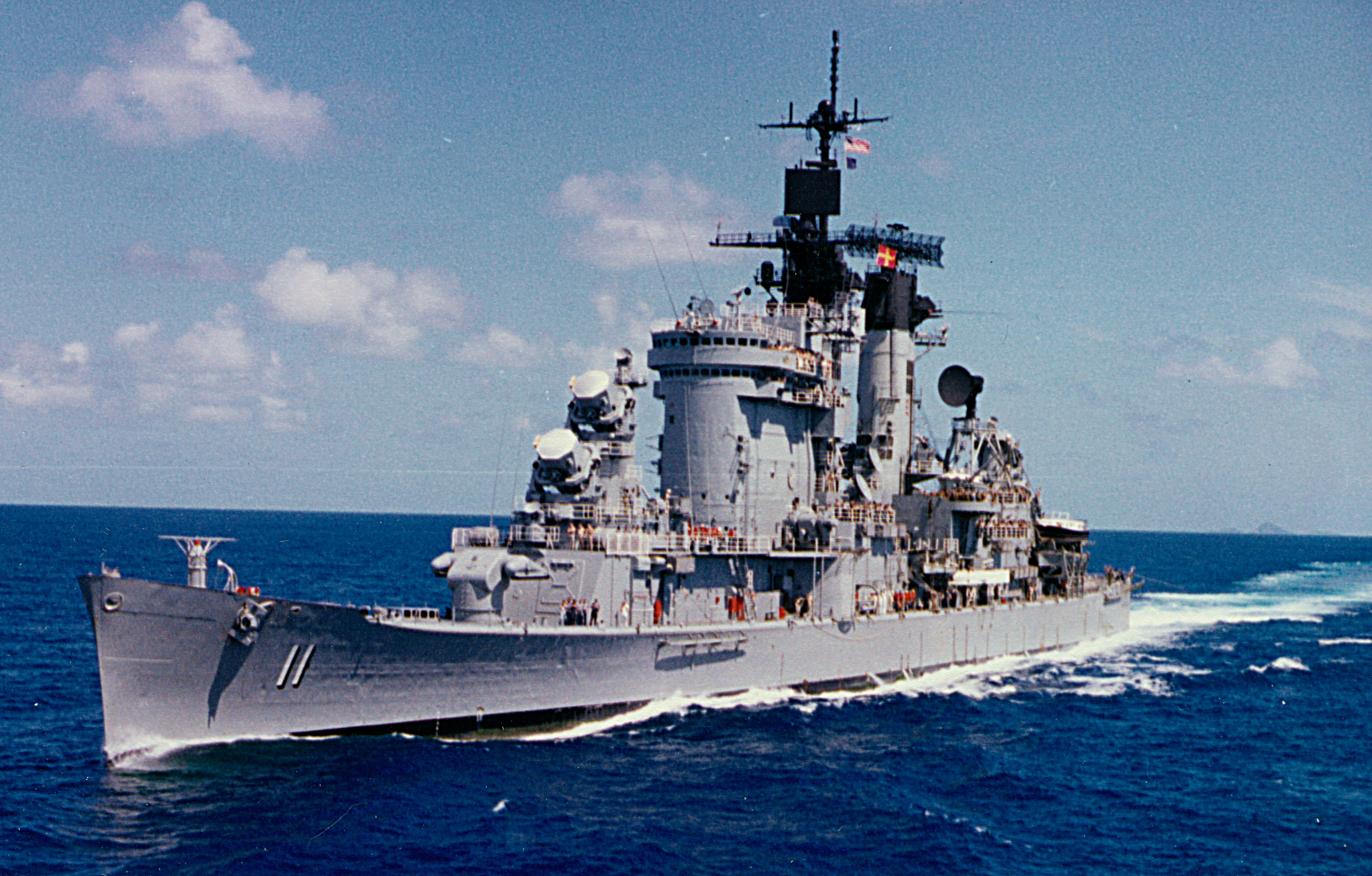
USS Chicago after reconstruction as an Albany-class cruiser

== Engineering and equipment ==
=== Hull ===
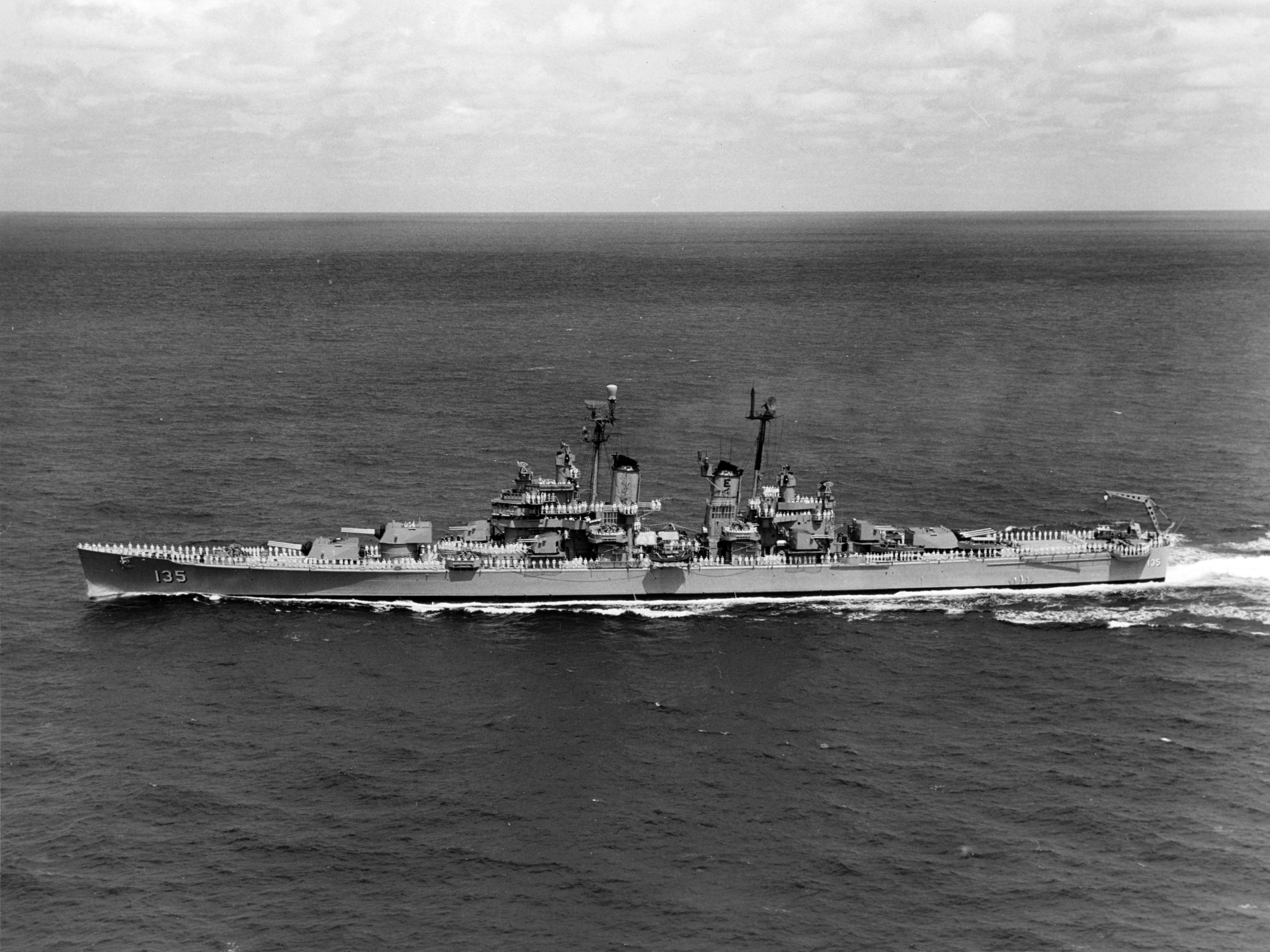
Side view of Los Angeles

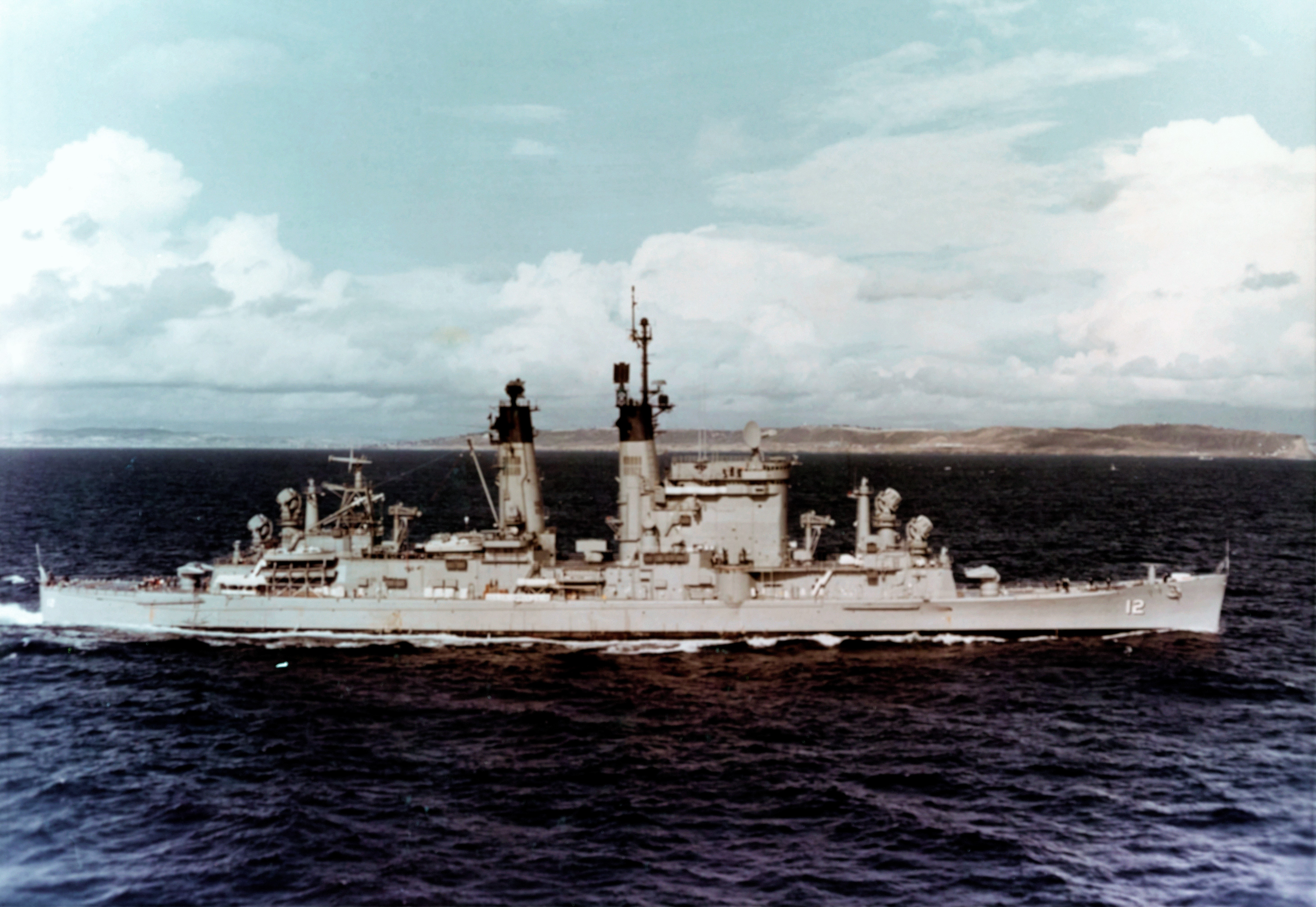
Side-view of Columbus, heavily refitted as an Albany-class cruiser

Baltimore-class cruisers were 673 feet 7 inches (205.31 m) long and 70 feet 10 inches (21.59 m) wide. Since the hull was not altered in either the Albany or the Boston class, these numbers were the same for those ships as well, but the alterations differentiated them in all other categories.

Fully loaded, original Baltimores displaced 17,031 long tons (17,304 t) of water. Their draft was 23 feet 11 inches (7.29 m). At the bow, the top level of the hull lay 33 feet (10 m) above the water; at the stern, 25 feet (7.6 m). The funnels were 86 feet (26 m) high, and the highest point on the masts was at 112 feet (34 m). The superstructure occupied about a third of the ship's length and was divided into two deckhouses. The gap between these housed the two thin funnels. Two masts, one a bit forward and the other a bit aft of the funnels, accommodated the positioning electronics.

The vertical belt armor was 6 inches (152 mm) thick and the horizontal deck armor was up to 3 inches (76.2 mm) thick. The turrets were also heavily armored, between 1.5–8 in (38–203 mm) thick, while the conning tower had up to 6.5 inches (165 mm).

The Boston class had a draft about 20 inches (510 mm) deeper in the water and displaced about 500 long tons (510 t) more water than their former sister ships. Because the Bostons were only partially refitted, the forward third of the ship remained virtually untouched. The first serious change was the combination of what were two funnels on the Baltimores to just one, thicker funnel, which still stood in the gap between the two deckhouses. Because the missiles required more guiding electronic systems, the forward mast was replaced with a four-legged lattice mast with an enlarged platform. The most conspicuous change was of course the addition of the missile-launching apparatus and its magazine of missiles, which took up the entire back half of the ship and replaced the guns which had been there.

The three Albanys were completely rebuilt from the deck level up; except for the hull, they bore very little resemblance to their former sister ships. The deckhouse now took up nearly two-thirds of the ship's length and was two decks high for almost the entire length. Above that lay the box-shaped bridge which was one of the most recognizable markers of the class. The two masts and funnels were combined into the so-called "macks", combining "mast" and "stack" (smokestack), where the electronics platforms were attached to the tops of the funnels rather than attached to masts rising all the way from the deck. The highest points on the forward mack were more than 130 feet (40 m) above the water line. Such heights could only be achieved with the use of aluminum alloys, which were used to a great extent in the construction of the superstructures. Despite this, the fully loaded displacement of the Albanys grew to more than 17,500 long tons (17,800 t).

=== Propulsion ===
The Baltimore cruisers were propelled with steam power. Each ship had four shafts, each with a propeller. The shafts were turned by four steam turbines, the steam produced by four boilers, which at full speed reached pressures of up to 615 pounds per square inch (4,240 kPa). The Baltimores each had two engine rooms and two funnels, although this was changed in the Bostons, which had only one funnel for all four boilers, as noted above. The high speed was around 33 knots (61 km/h) and the performance of the engine was around 120,000 horsepower (89 MW).

The original Baltimores could carry up to 2,250 long tons (2,290 t) of fuel, putting the maximum range at a cruising speed of 15 knots (28 km/h) at about 10,000 nautical miles (19,000 km). The increased displacement of the modified Boston and Albany classes meant their range was reduced to about 9000 and 7,000 miles (11,000 km) respectively, despite increases in fuel capacity to 2600 and 2500 tons.

=== Armament ===
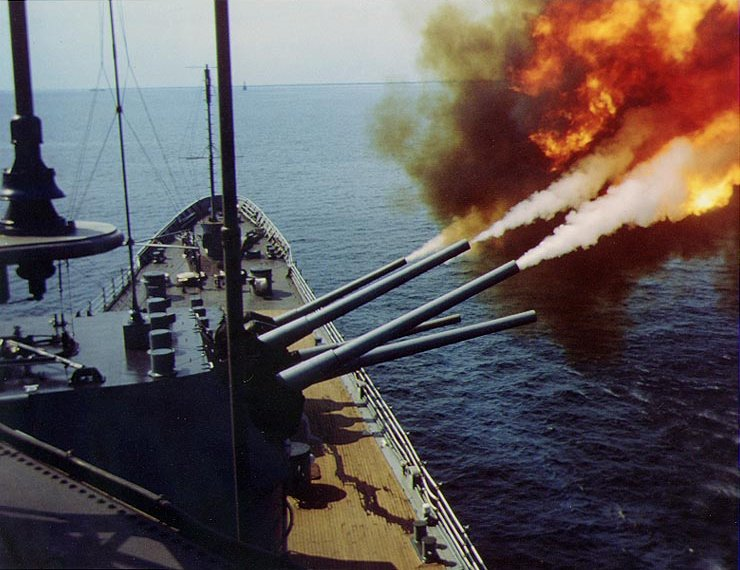
Salvo by both forward turrets on St. Paul during the Vietnam War

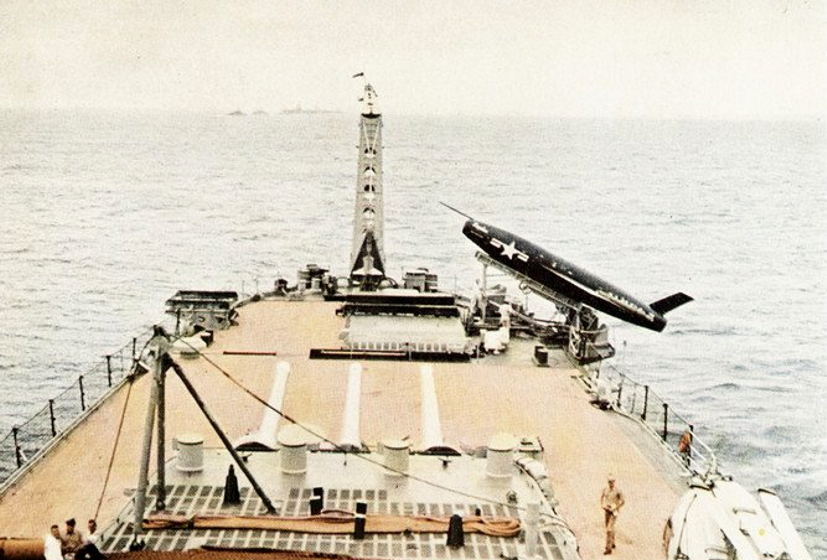
A Regulus missile ready to launch from Toledo in 1958

The main armament of the Baltimore class consisted of three turrets, each with three Mark 15 8"/55 caliber guns (Mark 12 in Baltimore). Two of these were located forward and one aft. They fired a 335-pound (152 kg) shell out to a maximum range of 30,050 yards (27,480 m). The armor-piercing shell could penetrate six inches of armor plating at 20,800 yards (19,000 m). The secondary armament consisted of twelve 5"/38 caliber guns in six twin mounts. Two mounts were located on each side of the superstructure and two were behind the main batteries fore and aft. These guns could be used against aircraft and surface targets. Their maximum range for surface targets was 17,575 yards (16,071 m) and they could reach aircraft at altitudes of up to 12,400 yards (11,300 m). In addition, the ships had numerous light anti-aircraft weapons: 12 quadruple mounts of Bofors 40 mm guns (or 11 quadruple mounts and 2 twin mounts on ships with only one rear aircraft crane) as well as 20–28 Oerlikon 20 mm cannons, depending on when a given ship was commissioned. After World War II the 20 mm anti-aircraft guns were removed without replacement, due to limited effectiveness against kamikaze attacks, and because it was expected they would be completely ineffective against postwar jet aircraft. The 40 mm Bofors were replaced with 3"/50 caliber guns in the 1950s.

Four ships, Toledo, Macon, Helena, and Los Angeles, were also each equipped with three nuclear cruise missiles of the SSM-N-8 Regulus type between 1956 and 1958. Ultimately, though, the deployment of such missiles on surface ships remained an experiment, which was only undertaken until the 1960s. The successor UGM-27 Polaris was carried only by nuclear submarines. In the late 1950s, plans were made to fit Polaris to missile conversions of these cruisers, but the only missile cruiser conversion ever so equipped was the Italian cruiser Giuseppe Garibaldi, (four tubes), and the missiles were never actually shipped.

=== Electronics ===
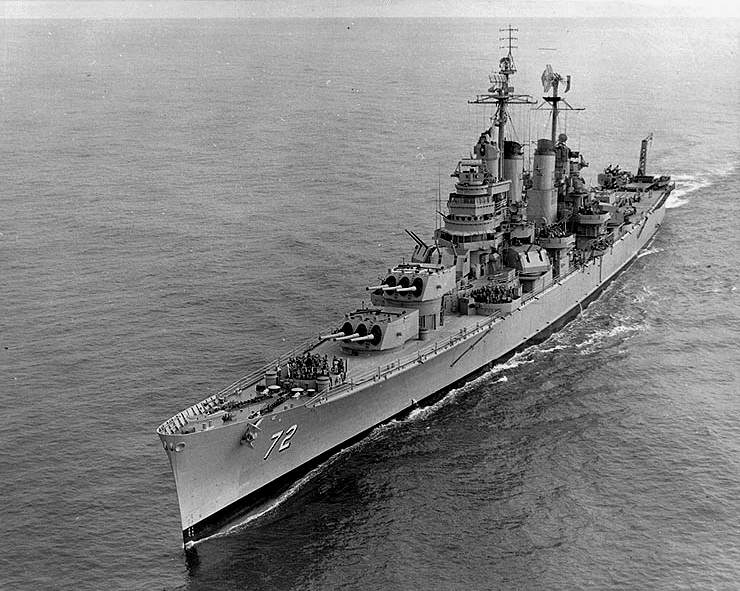
USS Pittsburgh with the SPS-8 on the aft mast, and the SPS-6 on the forward mast

Initially, the Baltimores were equipped with SG radar systems for surface targets and SK systems for airborne targets. The range of these systems for surface targets, depending on the size of the target was between 15 and 22 nautical miles (28 and 41 km). The SK could detect bombers at medium altitudes from 100 nautical miles (190 km). The radar systems were replaced in the Korean War with the more effective SPS-6 (built by Westinghouse Electric or later with the SPS-12 (from the Radio Corporation of America combined with an SPS-8 as a height-finder. With these systems, the detection range for bombers was increased to 145 miles (233 km). The ships in active service longer received further upgrades in their final years: the SPS-6 was replaced with the SPS-37 (also from Westinghouse) and the SPS-12 was replaced with the SPS-10 from Raytheon. With this equipment, planes could be detected at over 250 miles (400 km) away.

The Baltimore class was equipped from the start with electronic and electromechanical fire control systems to determine the fire parameters by which targets over the horizon could be hit. The main guns were controlled by a Mark 34 fire control system connected to an Mk 8 radar. The 5-inch/38 dual-purpose guns were guided by two Mk 37 systems with Mk 4 radar. Later, the fire control radars were replaced along with the main radar systems. The fire control systems remained the same except that the new 3-inch guns were upgraded to Mk 56 with Mk 35 radars.

=== Aircraft ===
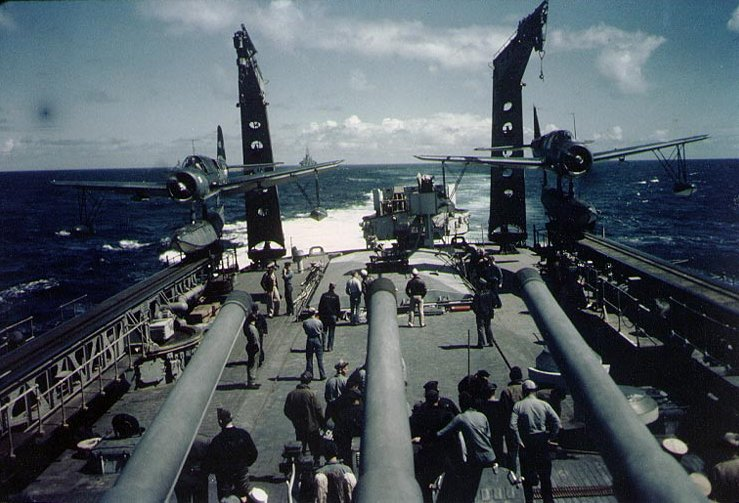
Two Kingfishers on their catapults on board USS Quincy

The onboard flight systems of the Baltimore-class cruisers during World War II consisted of two aircraft catapults on the side edges of the aft deck. Between the catapults was a sliding hatchway which was the roof of an onboard hangar. Directly under the hatch was an aircraft elevator. The hangar had room to accommodate up to four aircraft at one time, one to port forward of the elevator, one to port abeam the elevator, one starboard abeam, and one on the elevator itself. The first four ships of the class had two cranes each, while the later models had only one.

At full speed, the Vought OS2U Kingfisher could be launched from these catapults and later the Curtiss SC-1 Seahawk. These planes were used for reconnaissance, anti-submarine, and rescue missions. The planes were seaplanes, and after their missions would land in the water near the cruiser and be lifted back up into the ship by the crane or cranes in the rear and reset upon their catapults. In the 1950s, the catapults and the accompanying capacity to launch airplanes were removed, though the cranes were left and the hangars used to house helicopters, ship's boats or the workings of the Regulus missile system.

Macon in 1948 had a slightly elevated helipad installed instead of the catapults. Because of the helipad, the available firing angles for the main guns were sharply narrowed and the experiment was therefore quickly abandoned and not attempted on any other ships of the class. The ships of the Albany class did have an area on the deck for helicopters to land, but no platform.

=== Later designs ===
The hull of the Baltimore class was used for the development of several other classes. The Oregon City-class cruisers differed only slightly from Baltimores, because they were originally planned as Baltimore-class cruisers but were constructed based on modified plans. Though nine ships were planned, only three were completed. The main differences between the two classes are the reduction to a single-trunked funnel; a redesigned forward superstructure that was placed 40 feet (12 m) further aft, primarily to decrease top-heaviness; and an increase in the arcs of fire for the guns.

A fourth Oregon City-class cruiser, the Northampton (CLC-1), was ultimately completed as a light command cruiser. Despite having a heavy cruiser hull, she was classed as a light cruiser because her main armament of four 5 inch guns was smaller than the 8 inch guns usually found on heavy cruisers.

The Des Moines-class cruiser was an entirely new heavy cruiser design that attempted to improve upon the Baltimore class. While the basic deck and machinery layout was largely unchanged, this class carried the first fully automated high-caliber guns on a warship and had improved damage protection features, greatly improving both firepower and survivability. None was constructed in time to take part in World War II.

The plans for light aircraft carriers of the Saipan-class were adapted from the drafts of the Baltimore hull design, including the layout of the engines. The hulls of these ships were, however, significantly widened. The Saipan-class ships were completed in 1947 and 1948, but by the mid-1950s, they proved too small for the planes of the jet age and were converted for use as communication and command ships.

== Crew ==
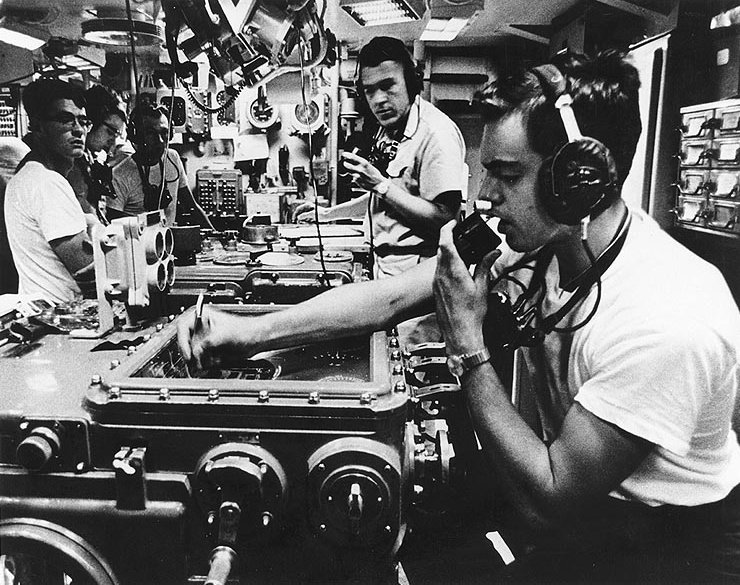
The crew of Canberra plotting target data

The size of the crew of a Baltimore-class cruiser varied by era and by tactical situation. Different sources also differ on the numbers. Naturally, the crew sizes were larger during wartime. Some cruisers—including all three of the modified Albany class—were used as flagships and therefore housed an admiral and his staff.

At launch, during, and shortly after the war, the crews consisted of around 60 officers and about 1000 rank-and-file crewmen. When an admiral's staff was aboard during wartime, this number could swell to 80 officers and 1500 crewmen. On the Bostons, the standard crew, even in peacetime and without an admiral's staff, was 80 officers and around 1650 crewmen. Because the Albany class was equipped almost exclusively for guided missiles, it required fewer crew than the Bostons and was roughly comparable numerically to the basic Baltimore.

Compared to today's crew sizes, these numbers seem high. The modern Ticonderoga-class cruiser is crewed by about 400. These differences are mostly due to the much less humanpower-intensive nature of modern weapon systems.

== Ships in class ==
(Note: the three Oregon City-class ships are not listed here)

Construction details
Ship name	Hull no.	Builder	Laid down	Launched	Comm./Recomm.	Decomm.	Fate
Baltimore	CA-68	Bethlehem Steel Corporation, Fore River Shipyard	26 May 1941	28 July 1942	15 April 1943	8 July 1946	Struck 15 February 1971, Broken up at Portland, Oregon, 1972
Baltimore	CA-68	Bethlehem Steel Corporation, Fore River Shipyard	26 May 1941	28 July 1942	28 November 1951	31 May 1956	Struck 15 February 1971, Broken up at Portland, Oregon, 1972
Boston	CA-69	Bethlehem Steel Corporation, Fore River Shipyard	30 June 1941	26 August 1942	30 June 1943	29 October 1946	Struck 4 January 1974; Sold for scrap 28 March 1975
Boston	CAG-1	Bethlehem Steel Corporation, Fore River Shipyard	30 June 1941	26 August 1942	1 November 1955	5 May 1970	Struck 4 January 1974; Sold for scrap 28 March 1975
Canberra (ex-Pittsburgh)	CA-70	Bethlehem Steel Corporation, Fore River Shipyard	3 September 1941	19 April 1943	14 October 1943	7 March 1947	Struck 31 July 1978; Sold for scrap 31 July 1980
Canberra (ex-Pittsburgh)	CAG-2	Bethlehem Steel Corporation, Fore River Shipyard	3 September 1941	19 April 1943	15 June 1956	2 February 1970	Struck 31 July 1978; Sold for scrap 31 July 1980
Quincy (ex-St. Paul)	CA-71	Bethlehem Steel Corporation, Fore River Shipyard	9 October 1941	23 June 1943	15 December 1943	19 October 1946	Struck 1 October 1973; Broken up at Portland, Oregon, 1974
Quincy (ex-St. Paul)	CA-71	Bethlehem Steel Corporation, Fore River Shipyard	9 October 1941	23 June 1943	31 January 1952	2 July 1954	Struck 1 October 1973; Broken up at Portland, Oregon, 1974
Pittsburgh (ex-Albany)	CA-72	Bethlehem Steel Corporation, Fore River Shipyard	3 February 1943	22 February 1944	10 October 1944	7 March 1947	Struck 1 July 1973; Broken up at Portland, Oregon, 1974
Pittsburgh (ex-Albany)	CA-72	Bethlehem Steel Corporation, Fore River Shipyard	3 February 1943	22 February 1944	25 September 1951	28 August 1956	Struck 1 July 1973; Broken up at Portland, Oregon, 1974
Saint Paul (ex-Rochester)	CA-73	Bethlehem Steel Corporation, Fore River Shipyard	3 February 1943	16 September 1944	17 February 1945	30 April 1971	Struck 31 July 1978; Broken up at Terminal Island, California, 1980
Columbus	CA-74	Bethlehem Steel Corporation, Fore River Shipyard	28 June 1943	30 November 1944	8 June 1945	8 May 1959	Struck 9 August 1976; Sold for scrap on 3 October 1977
Columbus	CG-12	Bethlehem Steel Corporation, Fore River Shipyard	28 June 1943	30 November 1944	1 December 1962	31 January 1975	Struck 9 August 1976; Sold for scrap on 3 October 1977
Helena (ex-Des Moines)	CA-75	Bethlehem Steel Corporation, Fore River Shipyard	9 September 1943	28 April 1945	4 September 1945	29 June 1963	Struck 1 January 1974; Broken up at Richmond, California, 1975
Bremerton	CA-130	New York Shipbuilding Corporation, Camden, New Jersey	1 February 1943	2 July 1944	29 April 1945	9 April 1948	Struck 1 October 1973; Broken up at Portland, Oregon, 1974
Bremerton	CA-130	New York Shipbuilding Corporation, Camden, New Jersey	1 February 1943	2 July 1944	23 November 1951	29 July 1960	Struck 1 October 1973; Broken up at Portland, Oregon, 1974
Fall River	CA-131	New York Shipbuilding Corporation, Camden, New Jersey	12 April 1943	13 August 1944	1 July 1945	31 October 1947	Struck 19 February 1971; Broken up at Portland, Oregon, 1972
Macon	CA-132	New York Shipbuilding Corporation, Camden, New Jersey	14 June 1943	15 October 1944	26 August 1945	12 April 1950	Struck 1 November 1969; Broken up at Port Newark, New Jersey, 1973
Macon	CA-132	New York Shipbuilding Corporation, Camden, New Jersey	14 June 1943	15 October 1944	16 October 1950	10 March 1961	Struck 1 November 1969; Broken up at Port Newark, New Jersey, 1973
Toledo	CA-133	New York Shipbuilding Corporation, Camden, New Jersey	13 September 1943	6 May 1945	27 October 1946	21 May 1960	Struck 1 January 1974; Broken up at Terminal Island, California, 1974
Los Angeles	CA-135	Philadelphia Naval Shipyard	28 July 1943	20 August 1944	22 July 1945	9 April 1948	Struck 1 January 1974; Broken up at San Pedro, California, 1975
Los Angeles	CA-135	Philadelphia Naval Shipyard	28 July 1943	20 August 1944	27 January 1951	15 November 1963	Struck 1 January 1974; Broken up at San Pedro, California, 1975
Chicago	CA-136	Philadelphia Naval Shipyard	28 July 1943	20 August 1944	10 January 1945	6 June 1947	Struck 31 January 1984; Sold for scrap 9 December 1991
Chicago	CG-11	Philadelphia Naval Shipyard	28 July 1943	20 August 1944	2 May 1964	1 March 1980	Struck 31 January 1984; Sold for scrap 9 December 1991

== See also ==
- List of cruisers of the United States Navy
- List of ship classes of the Second World War
