= USS Los Angeles (CA-135) =

Baltimore-class heavy cruiser

Coordinates: 33.7383914°N 118.2789471°W

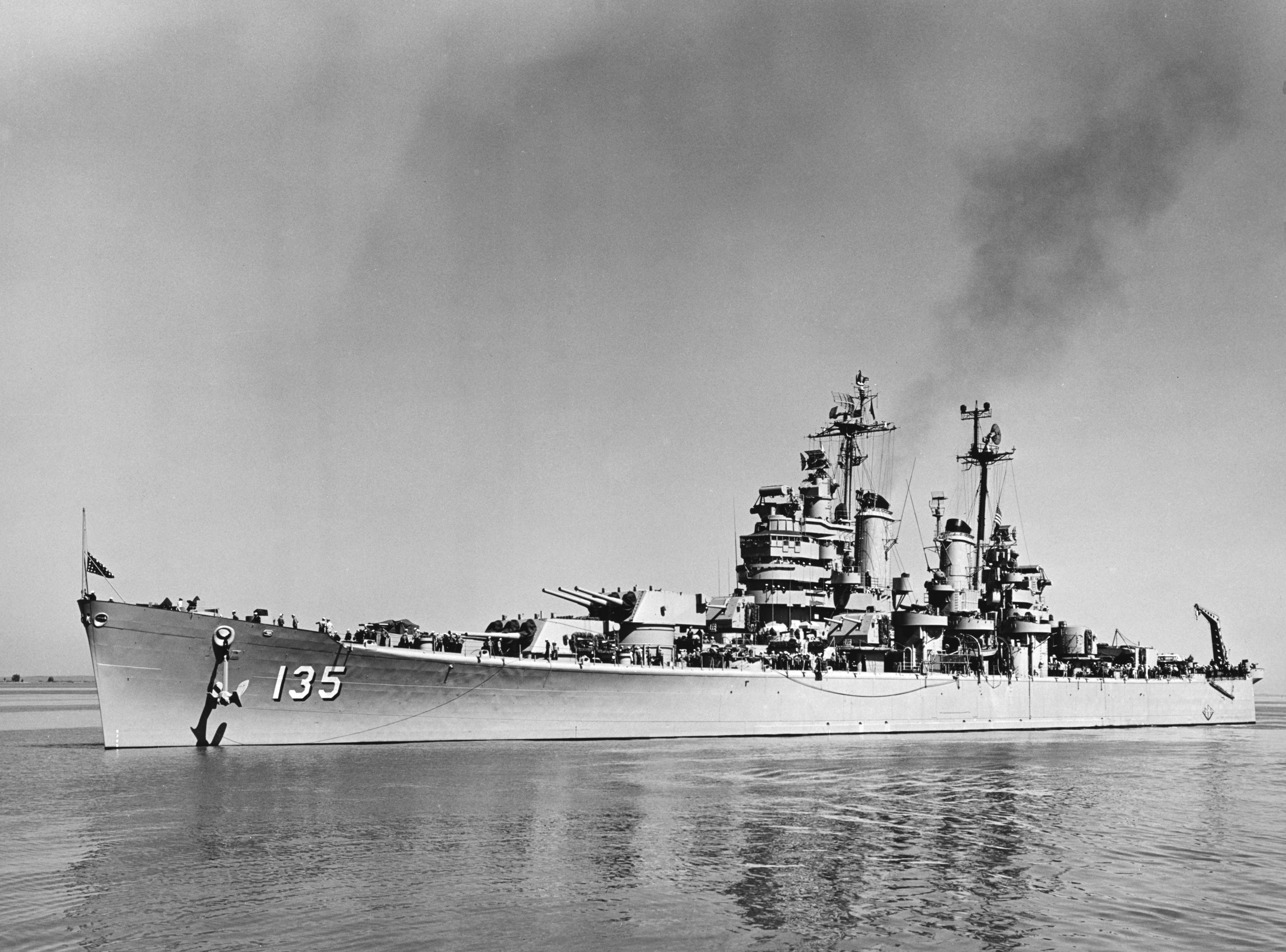
- USS Los Angeles in the Far East on 13 October 1952

History

United States
- Name: Los Angeles
- Namesake: City of Los Angeles, California
- Builder: Philadelphia Navy Yard
- Laid down: 28 July 1943
- Launched: 20 August 1944
- Commissioned: 22 July 1945
- Decommissioned: 9 April 1948
- Recommissioned: 27 January 1951
- Decommissioned: 15 November 1963
- Stricken: 1 January 1974
- Identification: Callsign: NTMG; Hull number: CA-135
- Motto: Non Sibi Sed Patriae; (Not for self, but for country)
- Honors and awards: See Awards
- Fate: Scrapped, 16 May 1975

General characteristics
- Class & type: Baltimore-class heavy cruiser
- Displacement: 13,600 long tons (13,818 t)
- Length: 674 ft 11 in (205.71 m)
- Beam: 70 ft 10 in (21.59 m)
- Draft: 20 ft 6 in (6.25 m)
- Speed: 33 knots (61 km/h; 38 mph)
- Complement: 1,142 officers and enlisted
- Armament: 9 × 8"/55 caliber guns (3×3); 12 × 5"/38 caliber guns (6×2); 48 × Bofors 40 mm guns (12×4); 28 × single Oerlikon 20 mm cannons
- Aircraft carried: Curtiss SC-1 Seahawk floatplane

Los Angeles Historic-Cultural Monument
- Official name: USS Los Angeles Naval Monument (John S. Gibson Jr. Park)
- Designated: 3 May 1978
- Reference no.: 188

The third USS Los Angeles (CA-135) was a Baltimore-class heavy cruiser, laid down by the Philadelphia Navy Yard, Philadelphia, on 28 July 1943 and launched on 20 August 1944. She was sponsored by Mrs. Fletcher Bowron and commissioned on 22 July 1945, with Captain John A. Snackenberg in command.

== Service history ==
=== 1944–1948 ===
After a shakedown cruise out of Guantánamo Bay, Cuba, Los Angeles sailed on 15 October for the Far East via the west coast and arrived at Shanghai, China, on 3 January 1946. During the next year she operated with the 7th Fleet along the coast of China and in the western Pacific to the Marianas. She returned to San Francisco, California, on 21 January 1947, and was decommissioned at Hunters Point on 9 April 1948, and entered the Pacific Reserve Fleet.

=== 1951–1953 ===
Los Angeles was recommissioned on 27 January 1951, Capt. Robert N. McFarlane in command. In response to the American efforts in the Korean War, she sailed for the Far East 14 May and joined naval operations off the eastern coast of Korea on 31 May as flagship for Rear Admiral Arleigh A. Burke's CRUDIV 5. During the next six months she ranged the coastal waters of the Korean Peninsula from Hungnam in the east to Haeju in the west while her guns pounded enemy coastal positions. After returning to the United States on 17 December for overhaul and training, she made her second deployment to Korean waters on 9 October 1952 and participated on 11 October in a concentrated shelling of enemy bunkers and observation points at Koji-ni. During the next few months, she continued to provide off-shore gunfire support for American ground operations, and cruised the Sea of Japan with fast carriers of the 7th Fleet. While participating in the bombardment of Wonsan late in March and early in April 1953, she received minor damage from enemy shore batteries, but continued operations until sailing for the west coast in mid-April. She arrived at Long Beach on 15 May.

=== 1953–1963 ===
Between November 1953 and June 1963 Los Angeles made eight more deployments to the Far East where she served as a cruiser division flagship with the 7th Fleet in support of "keeping the peace" operations in that troubled part of the world. Her operations sent her from the coast of Japan to the Sea of Japan, the Yellow Sea, and the East and South China Seas; and with units of the 7th Fleet she steamed to American bases in the Philippines and Okinawa, as well as to Allied bases in South Korea, Hong Kong, Australia, and Taiwan. During the Quemoy-Matsu crisis in 1956, she patrolled the Taiwan Strait to help protect ROC Army units from possible landing offenses from Communist China. When not deployed in the western Pacific, Los Angeles operated out of Long Beach along the west coast and in the Pacific to the Hawaiian Islands. She returned to Long Beach from her final Far East deployment on 20 June 1963.

== Decommissioning and sale ==
While some consideration was made to convert Los Angeles into a single-end Talos missile cruiser, with flagship facilities (in essence a heavy cruiser version of the Oklahoma City) funds were not appropriated for this or for a general overhaul to enable her continued fleet service, so she was decommissioned at Long Beach on 15 November 1963 and entered the Pacific Reserve Fleet at San Diego. Stricken on 1 January 1974, and sold on 16 May 1975 (sale #16-5049) to the National Steel Corporation for $1,864,380.21, and scrapped in San Pedro, California.

The flying bridge and a small portion of the bow section of the Los Angeles is on display at the Los Angeles Maritime Museum in San Pedro, CA.

== Awards ==
- Occupation Germany/Japan
- Asiatic–Pacific Campaign Medal
- World War II Victory Medal
- China Service Medal *2 Jan – 30 Aug 46
- National Defense Service Medal with star
- Korean Service Medal with 5 battle stars
- Armed Forces Expeditionary Medal with 2 battle stars
- United Nations Korea Medal
- Korean Presidential Unit Citation
