= USS Columbus (CA-74) =

United States Navy heavy cruiser

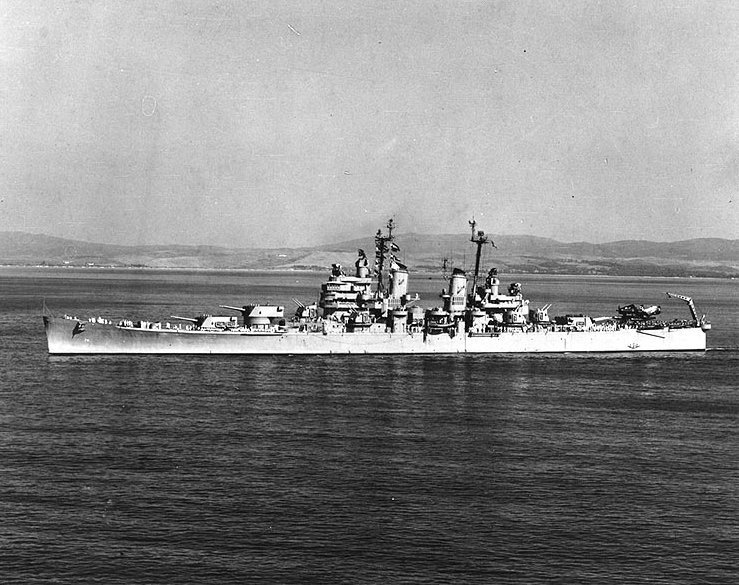
- USS Columbus on 12 July 1948

History

United States
- Name: Columbus
- Namesake: City of Columbus, Ohio
- Ordered: 9 September 1940
- Laid down: 28 June 1943
- Launched: 30 November 1944
- Sponsored by: Mrs. E. G. Meyers
- Commissioned: 8 June 1945
- Decommissioned: 31 January 1975
- Reclassified: CG-12, 30 September 1959
- Stricken: 9 August 1976
- Identification: Callsign: NBZW; Hull number: CA-74
- Motto: Ad Frontes Mundi
- Nickname(s): The Tall Lady
- Honors and awards: See Awards
- Fate: Scrapped, 3 October 1977
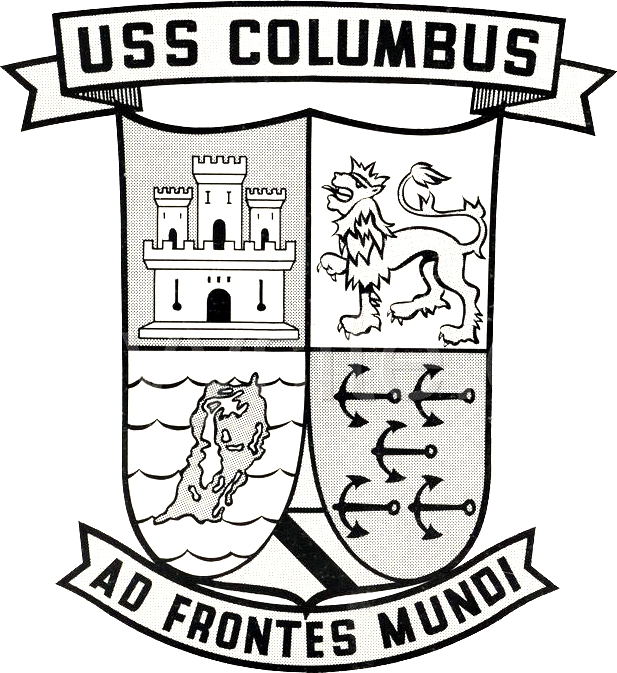
- Badge

General characteristics
- Class & type: Baltimore-class cruiser
- Displacement: 13,600 tons
- Length: 674 ft 11 in (205.71 m)
- Beam: 70 ft 10 in (21.59 m)
- Draft: 26 ft 5 in (8.05 m)
- Speed: 32.6 kn (60.4 km/h; 37.5 mph)
- Complement: 1,906 officers and enlisted
- Armament: 9 × 8 in (200 mm) guns; 12 × 5 in (130 mm) guns

The third USS Columbus (CA-74/CG-12), a Baltimore-class heavy cruiser, was the first ship of the United States Navy named for Columbus, Ohio. She was launched on 30 November 1944 by Bethlehem Steel Co., Quincy, Massachusetts; she was sponsored by Mrs. E. G. Meyers; and commissioned on 8 June 1945.

== History ==
=== As CA-74 ===
Joining the Pacific Fleet, Columbus reached Tsingtao, China, on 13 January 1946 for occupation duty. On 1 April, she helped to sink 24 Japanese submarines, prizes of war, and next day sailed for San Pedro, California. For the remainder of the year, she operated in west coast waters, then made a second Far Eastern cruise from 15 January to 12 June 1947.

After west coast operations and an overhaul at Puget Sound Naval Shipyard, Columbus cleared Bremerton on 12 April 1948 to join the Atlantic Fleet, arriving at Norfolk, Va., on 19 May. Columbus made two cruises as flagship of Commander-in-Chief, Naval Forces Eastern Atlantic and Mediterranean, from 13 September 1948 to 15 December 1949 and from 12 June 1950 to 5 October 1951, and one as flagship of Supreme Allied Commander, Atlantic, during parts of NATO Operation Mainbrace from 25 August to 29 September 1952. She cruised in the Mediterranean from October 1952 through January 1953, serving part of that time as flagship of the 6th Fleet. Now flagship of Cruiser Division 6, she returned to the Mediterranean from September 1954 to January 1955. Between deployments, Columbus received necessary overhauls and carried out training operations along the east coast and in the Caribbean.

Reassigned to the Pacific Fleet, Columbus cleared Boston, Massachusetts, on 8 November 1955 for Long Beach, California, where she arrived on 2 December. Just a month later, on 5 January 1956, she sailed for Yokosuka, Japan, and operated with the 7th Fleet until she returned to Long Beach on 8 July. Columbus made two more cruises to the Far East in 1957 and 1958. During the late summer of 1958, her presence was a reminder of American strength and interest as she patrolled the Taiwan Straits during the crisis brought on by the renewed shelling of the offshore islands by the Chinese communists. In late 1958 she was selected to be converted to carry guided missiles and on 8 May 1959, Columbus entered the Puget Sound Naval Shipyard to begin her conversion to an Albany-class guided missile cruiser.

=== As CG-12 ===
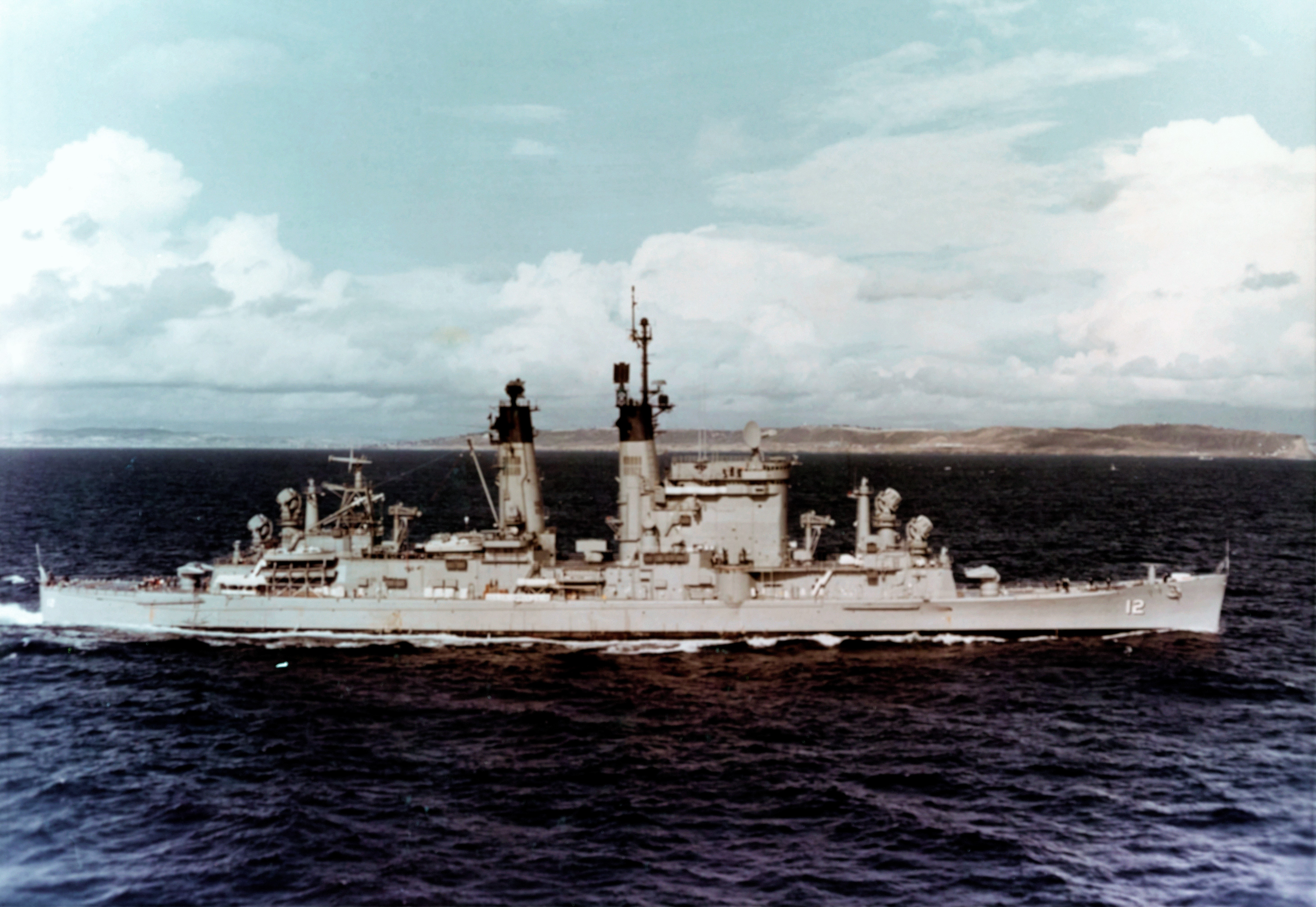
USS Columbus in 1965.

On 30 September 1959, Columbus was retrofitted as an Albany-class guided missile cruiser, joining USS Albany (CG-10) and USS Chicago (CG-11) as the only three ships of this line, and reclassified CG-12. USS Columbus (CG-12) was subsequently recommissioned on 1 December 1962 (following a much shorter conversion period than either Chicago or Albany), though a year and half long work-up and testing of her new weapons system delayed her first deployment to the western Pacific until August 1964.

The 1959 Albany-class refit of USS Columbus left CG-12 with the following armaments:

- RIM-8 Talos - 2 twin Talos SAM launch systems

Fore: Systems 1 & 2, with one launcher; Aft: Systems 7 & 8, with one launcher

- RIM-24 Tartar - 2 twin Tartar SAM launch systems

Starboard: Systems 3 & 5 with MK11 launcher; Port: Systems 4 & 6 with MK11 launcher

- Anti-submarine - 1 eight-tube ASROC system
- Torpedoes - 2 triple-tube Mk-32 torpedo systems
- two open mount 5 in (130 mm) naval guns port and starboard midships

==== Flagship ====
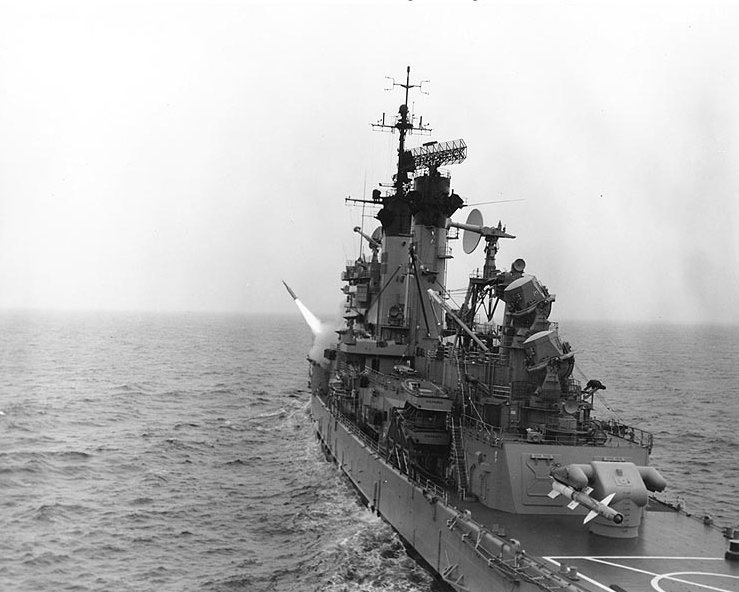
USS Columbus firing a Tartar missile while on deployment to Mediterranean

After visiting San Francisco, Puget Sound, and Hawaii as flagship of the 1965 Pacific Midshipman Training Squadron,

Parts of the ships are on display in Columbus.

== Awards ==
Columbus served as Flagship COMCRUDESFLOT throughout 1966, after assignment to the Atlantic Fleet at the start of that year. From 1966 until 1974, Columbus deployed to the Mediterranean seven times.

- September 1966 - March 1967
- January 1968 - July 1968
- December 1968 - May 1969
- 8 October 1969 - 18 March 1970
- 6 September 1970 - 1 March 1971
- 17 May 1972 - 18 October 1972
- 2 November 1973 - 31 May 1974

Unlike the Albany and Chicago, both of which received further upgrades, Columbus did not receive the digital missile fire-control and radar modernizations in 1970 due to cutbacks in the defense budget. The ship did however, receive a 5-month overhaul of her machinery, and heavy maintenance to her electrical and hull structures to keep her operational for another five years. Upon return from her final Mediterranean deployment on 31 May 1974, she entered port and began preparations for deactivation and decommissioning. After serving for 29.5 years, Columbus was decommissioned on 31 January 1975, stricken from the Naval Vessel Register on 9 August 1976 and sold for scrapping on 3 October 1977, to Union Minerals & Alloys Corp., and scrapped in Port Newark, NJ.

== Bibliography ==
- Wright, Christopher C. (1977). "The Tall Ladies...Columbus, Albany & Chicago". Warship International. XIV (2): 104–134. ISSN 0043-0374.
