= ASL (disambiguation) =

ASL is a common initialism for American Sign Language, the sign language of the United States and Canada (not be confused with Auslan, also called ASL or Asilulu language which has the ISO code ASL), and may also refer to:

== Culture ==
=== Sport ===
- American Soccer League (disambiguation)
- Australia's Surfing Life, surf magazine
- African Super League, a future CAF club competition
- Axpo Super League, former name of the Swiss Super League

=== Other uses ===
- A/S/L, a 2025 novel by Jeanne Thornton
- A Static Lullaby, American post-hardcore band
- Advanced Squad Leader, a tactical board wargame
- Age/sex/location, in early internet slang
- As hell, in Generation Z slang
- Average shot length, in film editing
- AfreecaTV StarCraft League, a video game tournament series

== Science and technology ==
=== Automobile ===
- ASL, Japanese car manufacturer known for producing the ASL Garaiya sports car

=== Aviation ===
- Aeronautical Syndicate, British aeroplane manufacturer
- Air Serbia, ICAO airline code
- ASL Airlines Australia
- ASL Airlines Ireland, cargo airline

=== Biology and medicine ===
- Airway surface liquid, mucus in the respiratory tract
- American Society of Lymphology, former name of the Lymphology Association of North America
- Argininosuccinate lyase, an enzyme
- Arterial spin labelling, a perfusion MRI technique

=== Computing ===
- ACPI Source Language, for ACPI tables
- Adobe Source Libraries, open-source GUI software libraries
- Advanced Simulation Library, open-source hardware-accelerated multiphysics simulation software
- AMPL Solver Library, an open-source automatic differentiation library
- Apache Software License, an open-source license for software
- Application Services Library, a process model for the maintenance of software applications
- Arithmetic shift left, an operation implementing an arithmetic shift

=== Other uses ===
- Above sea level, an altitude measurement
- Association for Symbolic Logic, of specialists in mathematical logic and philosophical logic
- Automated side loader, type of garbage collection truck
- Atmospheric Sciences Laboratory, a research institution formerly under the U.S. Army Materiel Command

== Society ==
=== Education ===
- The American School in London
- Appalachian School of Law, Grundy, Virginia
- Art Students' League of Philadelphia
- Additional Support for Learning, Scotland
- Hong Kong Advanced Supplementary Level Examination, a standardized examination from 1994 to 2013

=== Other uses ===
- Anti-Saloon League, an organization of temperance movements that lobbied for prohibition in the United States
- Advanced stop line, a road marking at junctions
- Artists' Suffrage League, UK
- Ansar al-Sharia in Libya, a Salafist Islamist militia group
- Animelo Summer Live, a Japanese music festival
- Azienda sanitaria locale, local healthcare services in Italy
