= ASLP =

ASLP may refer to:

- Archipelagic sea lanes passage
- The American School of Las Palmas
- Age/sex/location and picture, an Internet slang term
- Amalgamated Society of Lithographic Printers
- Adkins Life Skills Career Development Program of Winthrop Adkins
