= CA-134 =

CA-134 may refer to one of the following:

- USS Des Moines (CA-134), the lead ship of the Des Moines class heavy cruisers which served with the United States Navy from 1948 to 1961
- California State Route 134, a segment of the Ventura Freeway near Los Angeles, California
