= Winthrop Adkins =

Syrian-American academic

- Born: October 25, 1932; Beirut, Syria (now Lebanon)
- Died: July 17, 2015 (aged 82)
- Education: Phillips Academy, Andover; Princeton University; Teachers College, Columbia University (Ph.D., 1963)
- Known for: Adkins Life Skills Career Development Program
- Scientific career
- Workplaces: York College, City University of New York; Harvard University; Teachers College, Columbia University

Winthrop R. Adkins (October 25, 1932 – July 17, 2015) was a professor emeritus of psychology and education at Teachers College, Columbia University.

== Early life and education ==
Adkins was born in Beirut, Syria (now Lebanon) to Turkish and Syrian missionaries Leslie John Adkins and Edith Sanderson. Adkins was a graduate of Phillips Academy Andover and in 1955 he graduated from Princeton University where one of his classmates was Ralph Nader. For 12 years, Adkins served in the US Navy starting from his time in the Naval Reserve Officers Training Corps at Princeton to his service as a naval officer on the USS Salem the flagship of the US Sixth Fleet in the Mediterranean. . Following his service Adkins attended Columbia University and in 1963 obtained his PhD in Counseling Psychology.

== Career ==
After obtaining his doctorate Adkins spent a year at Harvard University where he worked on Achievement Motivation with David McClelland at the Center for Personality. Following his Harvard appointment Adkins became involved with the War on Poverty working at the YMCA of Greater New York with Dr. Paul Sharer and Dr. Sidney Rosenberg. Together they developed Project TRY, a federally funded training center for unemployed youth.

In 1966, Adkins became a founding faculty member of York College, City University of New York, where he developed, along with others, the Search for Education, Elevation and Knowledge project. The project later turned into a program whose goal was to provide support for low income students. The program now known as SEEK is still used today and is an integral part of the City University System.

Adkins then joined the faculty of Teachers College, Columbia University where he had originally worked on the famous Career Pattern Study with Prof. Donald Super. While there he created the Institute for Life Coping Skills. For the next thirty years he developed and taught others how to develop psychoeducational programs using a variety of new multi-media methods.. The programs were directed at helping people learn the complex attitudes and behaviors they needed to cope with the predictable tasks of career, marriage and parenting

During his career, Adkins trained many graduate students on how to develop psychological and behavioral interventions, using his methods and theory. In addition to his university and research work Adkins served on many non-profit boards of directors, including the HOPE Program for the homeless, the NYS Advisory Group on Adult Education, the Greenwich Adult and Continuing Program and the Center for Insurance Research. He was a founding member of the Princeton Project '55 Center for Civic Leadership.

=== ALSP ===
Adkins was best known as the pioneer behind the development of the Adkins Life Skills Career Development Program (ASLP), originally published by Psychological Corporation, a division of Harcourt, Brace and Jovanovich (now Harcourt Assessment). The program directed at lower income populations helped people learn how the world of work operated, how to make short and long-term job, career and educational decisions and most importantly learn to become self-aware and self-directing.

The program, also available in Spanish and Italian versions, was used in over 2,000 agencies including prisons, homeless shelters, drug rehabilitation centers, welfare-to-work programs, economic opportunity centers and community colleges. The Institute trained over 5000 staff members as Life Skills educators who delivered the program to clients in their own agencies. In later years as many as 200 community colleges in India adopted the Life Coping Skills curriculum to help their students from rural provinces learn the skills they needed to cope with urban life.

The success and impact of the program was well documented in numerous academic and research articles as well as program evaluation reports related to federal and state funding.

Death and Personal LIfe

Adkins died following lung surgery at the age of 82. He was married to Caroline Manuele Adkins, a psychologist and Professor Emerita, Hunter College, City University of New York Together they raised a son, Jason and daughter, Jennifer.
