= USS Ammen (DD-527) =

Fletcher-class destroyer

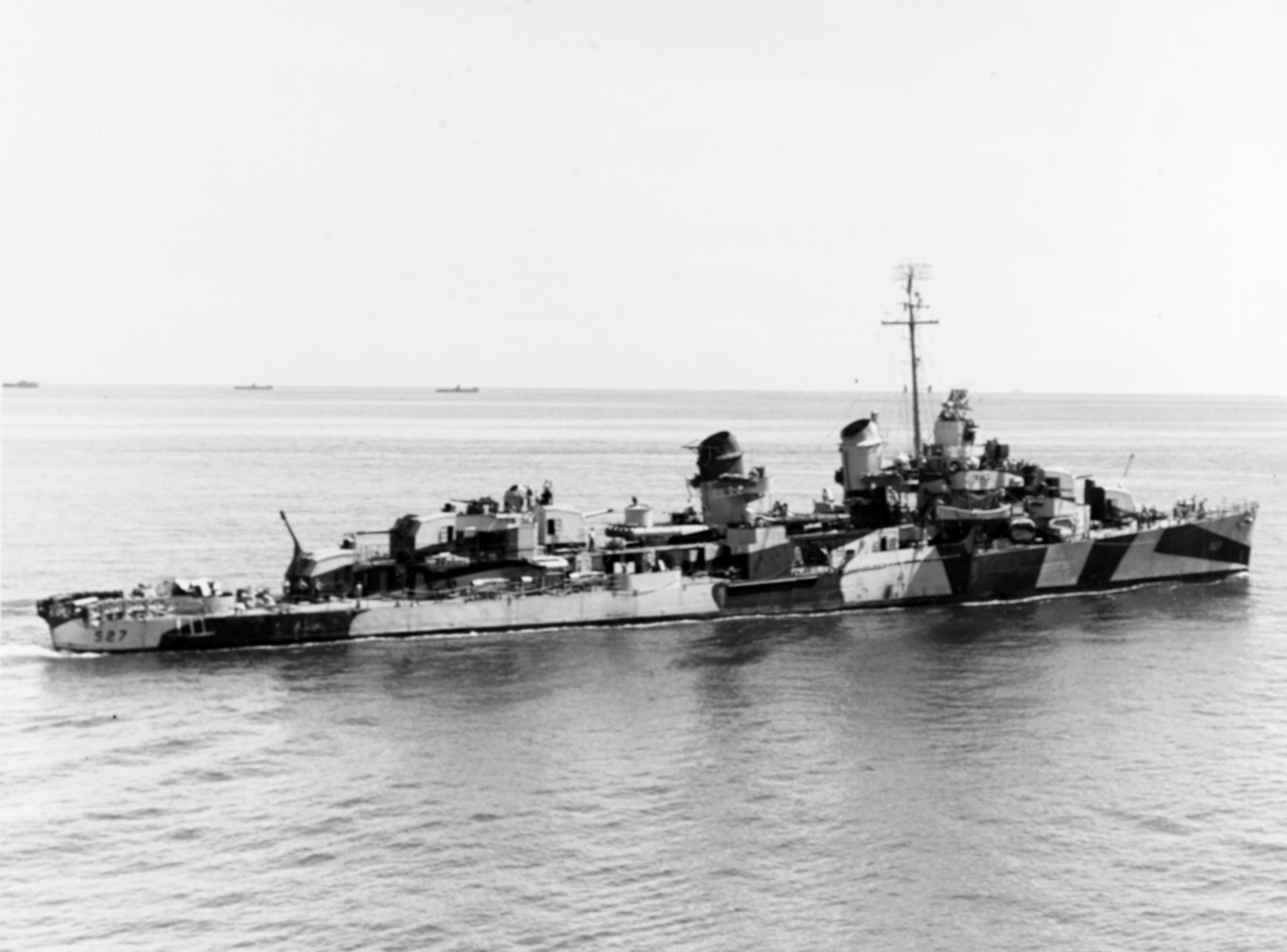
- USS Ammen (DD-527) underway off Leyte, 20–24 October 1944

History

United States
- Namesake: Daniel Ammen
- Builder: Bethlehem Shipbuilding Corporation, San Francisco, California
- Laid down: 29 November 1941
- Launched: 17 September 1942
- Commissioned: 20 March 1943
- Decommissioned: 15 September 1960
- Stricken: 1 October 1960
- Fate: Sold for scrap, 20 April 1961

General characteristics
- Class & type: Fletcher-class destroyer
- Displacement: 2,050 tons
- Length: 376 ft 6 in (114.7 m)
- Beam: 39 ft 8 in (12.1 m)
- Draft: 17 ft 9 in (5.4 m)
- Propulsion: 60,000 shp (45 MW); 2 propellers
- Speed: 35 knots (65 km/h; 40 mph)
- Range: 6500 nm at 15 kn (12,000 km at 28 km/h)
- Complement: 336
- Armament: 5 × single Mk 12 5 in (127 mm)/38 guns; 5 × twin 40 mm (1.6 in) Bofors AA guns; 7 × single 20 mm (0.8 in) Oerlikon AA guns; 2 × quintuple 21 in (533 mm) torpedo tubes; 6 × single depth charge throwers; 2 × depth charge racks

USS Ammen (DD-527), a Fletcher-class destroyer, was the second ship of the United States Navy to be named for Rear Admiral Daniel Ammen (1820–1898).

== Construction and commissioning ==
Ammen was laid down on 29 November 1941 at San Francisco, California, by the Bethlehem Steel Corporation; launched on 17 September 1942; sponsored by Miss Eva Ammen; and commissioned on 20 March 1943, Commander John C. Daniel in command.

== Service history ==
=== Alaska, March–November 1943 ===
Ammen put to sea on 30 March bound for San Diego where she completed her shakedown training. The destroyer departed San Diego on 20 April and arrived in San Pedro the following day. Two days later, she embarked upon a voyage to Alaskan waters as part of the screen for Task Force 51 (TF 51), built around Pennsylvania. The task force arrived at Cold Bay, Alaska, on 1 May and, 10 days later, participated in the landings on Attu Island. During that operation, Ammen's primary responsibility consisted of providing antisubmarine and antiaircraft protection for the ships of the invasion force. Since the air threat never materialized and the submarine menace proved almost as benign, she fired no shots at the enemy but struggled mightily against the inhospitable Aleutian climate.

At the conclusion of her part in the operation, Ammen headed back to California, arriving in San Diego on 31 May. The destroyer underwent two weeks of repairs at San Diego and then moved north to San Francisco where she resumed post-shakedown availability. On 11 July, she departed San Francisco in the screen of another convoy bound for Alaska. She escorted the convoy to a point about 900 miles from Adak Island where other escorts took over the mission. Ammen returned to San Francisco on 21 July but remained there only eight days. On 29 July, the destroyer put to sea with another Alaska-bound convoy. She shepherded her charges into port at Adak on 5 August and began preparations for the occupation of Kiska. That operation proved to be a walkover for the simple reason that the Japanese had evacuated Kiska. The destroyer returned to Adak on 12 September and remained there until 24 September. She put to sea again on the 24th, made a brief stop back at Kiska on the 25th, and then headed on to Pearl Harbor. Ammen arrived at her destination on 2 October and spent the ensuing nine days practicing gunnery, torpedo, and antisubmarine warfare (ASW) techniques. On 11 October, she departed Pearl Harbor in company with Bush. The destroyer arrived back at Adak on 16 October and, for the next six weeks patrolled in the Aleutian Islands.

=== New Guinea, November 1943 – September 1944 ===
On 26 November, Ammen left Adak bound for the southwestern Pacific. She made a five-day stop at Pearl Harbor before resuming her voyage on 9 December. Steaming by way of Funafuti in the Ellice Islands and Espiritu Santo in the New Hebrides, the warship arrived at Milne Bay, New Guinea, on 18 December. There, she became a unit of the 7th Fleet. For the next nine months, Ammen focused her energies on the series of operations that wrested control of the northern coast of New Guinea from the Japanese and isolated their big bases in the Bismarck Archipelago at Rabaul on New Britain and Kavieng on New Ireland. Between late December 1943 and late January 1944, Ammen supported the Allied landings at Cape Gloucester on the western end of New Britain as an element of the Cruiser Bombardment Unit under Rear Admiral V.A.C. Crutchley VC, RN. In addition to providing antisubmarine and antiaircraft protection for the larger ships, she transported casualties from the battle ashore and conducted shore bombardments.

In February, the destroyer visited Sydney, Australia, returning to the New Guinea area at Milne Bay on 22 February. A week later, Ammen put to sea in the screen of an LST task unit, the first resupply echelon for the reconnaissance in force of Los Negros Island that burgeoned into the occupation of the Admiralty Islands. During the first half of March, Ammen busied herself providing gunfire support for the soldiers securing a hold on Los Negros and fighting off air attacks. Between 17 and 19 March, she joined Beale, Daly, Hutchins, and Mullany in a fruitless anti-shipping sweep along the coast of New Guinea near enemy-held Wewak.

After several weeks of upkeep at Milne Bay and training exercises in that vicinity, Ammen put to sea once again on 18 April in company with Rear Admiral Crutchley's cruiser-destroyer force to support the next hop in the leapfrog along the northern coast of New Guinea-the Aitape-Hollandia invasion. During the assault at Tanamerah Bay, the destroyer provided antisubmarine and antiaircraft protection to gunfire support ships of the force and contributed her share of call fire as well. Later, she joined the screen of Task Group 78.2 (TG 78.2), one of two escort carrier task groups providing close air support for the troops ashore, until the middle of the first week in May.

After a respite at Manus, Ammen departed Seeadler Harbor in mid-May in company again with Admiral Crutchley's Australian and American cruisers and destroyers. The warships steamed to Hollandia, New Guinea, where they took station offshore to cover the invasion force assembled there. After sundown on 16 May, the entire force began the voyage to the Wakde-Sarmi area of northwestern New Guinea. From 17 to 21 May, Ammen and her consorts brought their guns to bear on Japanese targets in support of the troops charged with the seizure of the region. On 27 May, the destroyer was off Biak in the Schouten Islands located just to the north of the western end of New Guinea and, due east of the peninsula then known as the Vogelkop. During the amphibious assault at Bosnik on the southeastern coast of Biak, Ammen's guns struck at enemy positions once more. After the initial landings, Ammen's cruiser-destroyer force alternated with Rear Admiral Russell S. Berkey's TF 75 built around Phoenix, Nashville, and Boise in covering the invasion forces from enemy air and naval interference. Ammen's group fought off several half-hearted air attacks and foiled an attempted reinforcement by destroyers on the night of 8–9 June. The destroyer and her colleagues concluded their part in the Biak operation at the end of the third week in June and entered Seeadler Harbor for a week of upkeep.

On 30 June, the warship put to sea in the screen of the bombardment force assigned to the seizure of Noemfoor, an island located between Biak and the Vogelkop. During the landings on 2 July, Ammen drew no gunfire support missions and so, contented herself with antisubmarine and antiaircraft defense patrols against an enemy notable only for his absence. Between the conclusion of her part in the Noemfoor occupation and the Sansapor operation late in July, the destroyer carried out harassment missions against bypassed Japanese garrisons on the New Guinea coast from the base at Aitape. During the last four days of July, Ammen participated in the unopposed landings at Cape Sansapor on the northwestern coast of the Vogelkop. After Sansapor, the warship embarked upon a voyage to Sydney, Australia, for an 18-day liberty and upkeep call.

On 26 August, Ammen headed back to the combat zone. Steaming by way of Milne Bay, New Guinea, she arrived in Seeadler Harbor, Manus, on 1 September. The destroyer spent the first 10 days of September engaged in drills and upkeep at Manus. On the 11th, she got underway for Morotai and another uncontested landing. The warship spent only two days at Morotai before returning to Seeadler Harbor via Mios Woendi.

=== Philippines, October–December 1944 ===
Ammen remained at Manus from 29 September until 11 October. On the latter day, she put to sea on a circuitous voyage bound ultimately for the invasion of the Philippines at Leyte. That circuit took her first to the northern coast of New Guinea where-at Humboldt Bay-she became a unit of the screen of the invasion force flagship Wasatch. The flagship group weighed anchor on 15 October and laid in a course for Leyte Gulf. The destroyer escorted the command ship into Leyte Gulf in the predawn darkness of 20 October. The preparatory shore bombardment began about 0700 and lasted until just before 0945. At that point the landing craft began their approach to the beaches. Assigned to protect the force flagship, Ammen took no part in the festivities but watched dutifully for the intrusion of enemy aircraft and submarines. For the first five days of the Leyte undertaking, she continued to provide antiair and antisubmarine coverage to Wasatch and escorted her out to sea during her nightly retirements from San Pedro Bay.

Her duties with respect to the flagship kept Ammen out of both the surface actions launched by the Japanese to contest the invasion of Leyte. By the time she was detached to join TG 77.3 on the afternoon of 25 October to guard the eastern entrance to Leyte Gulf, the Japanese had shot their bolt. The forces that had tried to charge through Surigao Strait to the south received a shattering welcome from the battleships, cruisers, and destroyers under Rear Admiral Jesse Oldendorf, and the Yamato force that had sneaked through San Bernardino Strait went about to retrace its path in face of the desperate resistance put up off Samar by the escort carriers and, particularly, by the destroyers and destroyer escorts screening them.

Though the major Japanese effort to disrupt the Leyte landings had been foiled, it was not immediately apparent. As a consequence, Ammen served with several defensive formations on an ad hoc basis. As already stated, she joined TG 77.3 on the afternoon of 25 October to help guard the eastern entrance to Leyte Gulf. That assignment lasted until the early morning hours of the 27th when she transferred to TG 77.4, the escort carrier group that had been mauled off Samar on the 25th. Soon thereafter, she was assigned more specifically to Task Unit 77.4.2 (TU 77.4.2) built around Natoma Bay and five other escort carriers. Ammen served with that outfit until the early morning hours of 29 October when she was reassigned to TG 77.2 inside Leyte Gulf. Later that day, the destroyer resumed duty screening the flagship as an element of TG 77.1.

Rebuffed on the surface, the Japanese resorted to an aerial blitz. Ammen spent the first 16 days of November helping to ward off enemy aircraft. On the very first day, 1 November, a burning Yokosuka P1Y "Frances" twin-engine bomber struck Ammen 15 feet from the bridge crew taking off a searchlight and two stacks. The plane caromed off the ship into the sea but caused considerable topside damage and inflicted 26 casualties, including five dead. Ammen, however, carried on with her duties and claimed a number of hits and two probable kills in the aerial onslaught over the following two weeks. On 16 November, the warship laid in a course for the Admiralty Islands. She entered Seeadler Harbor on 21 November and spent the next nine days preparing for the voyage back to the United States. On 30 November, Ammen departed Manus and pointed her bow east toward the United States. After stops at Majuro and Pearl Harbor, she arrived in San Francisco on 21 December.

=== Okinawa, March–June 1945 ===
Repairs to her battle damage carried out at the Mare Island Navy Yard kept Ammen out of the Lingayen Gulf operation in January 1945, and their completion at the beginning of the second week in February came too late for the destroyer to play a part in the mid-February seizure of Iwo Jima. On 9 February 1945, she sailed out of the Golden Gate in company with Chenango and set a course for Pearl Harbor. The two warships reached Oahu on 15 February, and Ammen performed training and carrier escort missions in the Hawaiian Islands until the middle of the first week in March. On 4 March, the destroyer departed Pearl Harbor in company with St. Louis and her old division mate, Beale. The three warships made one stop-at Eniwetok on the 10th for fuel-before arriving at Ulithi Atoll on 13 March. Leaving St. Louis at Ulithi, Ammen and Beale returned to sea on their way back to Leyte. Ammen and her colleague reached their destination on St. Patrick's Day 1945 and set about practicing for the invasion of the Ryukyu Islands.

On 27 March, she stood out of Leyte Gulf with TF 55, the Southern Attack Force, bound for the assault on Okinawa. The task force arrived off the assault beaches early in the morning of 1 April-Easter Sunday, April Fool's Day, and L-day for the invasion of Okinawa. Ammen took up screening station in the transport area while the troops in the transports made final preparations. The first wave rolled ashore just after 0830. Ammen spent the first 10 days of April providing antisubmarine and antiaircraft protection for the troop and cargo ships unloading at Okinawa. On the 10th, the destroyer joined TG 51.2 in a voyage to the Marianas, arriving back in the Ryukyus on the 20th.

Her return to Okinawa on 20 April marked the beginning of Ammen's service on various of the radar picket stations established in the waters surrounding Okinawa to warn of approaching air raids and to help repulse them. Few tasks in World War II proved more arduous. It consisted of a grueling schedule of duty against fanatical and, more often than not, suicidal Japanese aviators. Ammen received her baptism in the Okinawa hail storm that night. After tracking her first bogey on radar picket duty just after midnight on the 21st, she failed to detect a second plane that flew in low and dropped a bomb fairly close aboard on her starboard quarter. The near miss exploded in the water, showering the warship with fragments. In that brief encounter, eight of her crew suffered wounds. Ammen remained on station until the evening of the 21st, when she was relieved by Russell. The destroyer proceeded to the Hagushi beaches where she transferred the more serious of her casualties to Crescent City before entering Kerama Retto for repairs and replenishment.

Following patrol duty on the 26th and 27th, she took over support ship duties from Mustin on radar picket station number 1 north of Okinawa late in the morning of the 28th. That afternoon, an enemy raid-part of the fourth of the 10 major air assaults mounted by the Japanese in the effort to thwart the Okinawa invasion-approached Ammen and Bennion, the ship she was supporting on the radar picket station. A Nakajima Ki-43 "Oscar" dove on Ammen and Bennion. Both destroyers opened fire on the intruder but failed to stop him. He crashed Bennion's fantail but caused only minor damage.

While snoopers probed the area throughout the night, none approached nearer than three or four miles, and no new attacks developed until the following night. Just before 02:00 on 30 April, a group of between six and eight bogies appeared on Ammen's radar screen headed directly for her station. The destroyer opened fire about five minutes after the contacts were made. Smart ship handling caused the first two suiciders to overshoot Ammen and splash into the sea fairly close aboard to port. Bennion suffered additional minor damage when the third kamikaze struck another glancing blow to her fantail. Ammen received the attention of the fourth member of the group, but he, too, went into the sea. The two destroyers then combined forces to knock the fifth intruder out of the sky with antiaircraft fire. The sixth bandit went into the sea about three or four miles off to starboard. The final plane in the group fell before the guns of an American night fighter.

Relative quiet returned to her station during the daylight hours of the 30th and the following night. Not long before noon on 1 May, Ammen, relieved by Ingraham, headed for Hagushi anchorage to receive on board a fighter director team along with its equipment. After refueling and replenishing at Kerama Retto, the destroyer headed for radar picket station 9 during the evening of 3 May. She remained on station until the 9th, directing combat air patrol (CAP) fighters put to meet sporadic raids of one, two, and three planes. Relieved by William D. Porter on the morning of 9 May, Ammen replenished at Kerama Retto that day and then moved on to Hagushi anchorage on the 10th. While at Hagushi, the destroyer opened fire briefly on the evening of 12 May at an "Oscar" and a Nakajima Ki-44 "Tojo." Both planes attempted suicide dives on New Mexico. The "Oscar" overshot the mark, but the "Tojo" struck New Mexico amidships.

On 13 May, Ammen returned to radar picket duty, relieving Lowry as fighter director on station 16 about 50 miles west northwest of the peninsula on Okinawa known as Zampa Misaki. Over the next six days, the destroyer directed her CAP fighters out to meet a number of raids, but she, herself, fought no engagements with enemy aircraft. On the 18th, Ammen stood down and headed back to Hagushi. On the 19th, she put into Kerama Retto for repairs alongside Hamul until the 22d. After two days back at Hagushi, the destroyer resumed duty with the radar pickets in the afternoon of 24 May.

Her return coincided with the seventh of Japan's 10 kikusui attacks on Okinawa shipping. The onslaught had begun the previous evening but had subsided somewhat during the daylight hours of the 24th when Ammen resumed duty as a fighter director. Just before 2000, the Japanese renewed their attacks with increasing intensity. The first six raids she detected posed no real threat to Ammen and her colleagues at radar picket station 15. The seventh raid closed to within five miles of her station but kept its distance in face of antiaircraft fire from Ammen's consorts. From that time until about 0300 on the 25th, aircraft flew back and forth over station 15. The warships assigned there let fly with their antiaircraft batteries whenever enemy planes approached.

Throughout the night of 24–25 May, no Japanese aviator made a really determined attack on radar picket station 15. In fact, Ammen's radar screen remained clear of bogies during the morning watch of 25 May. Half an hour into the forenoon watch, however, things began to warm up. She detected a group of enemy planes approaching from the north about 40 miles distant. The destroyer dispatched her CAP fighters to meet the enemy, and they bagged two Nakajima Ki-44 "Tojo" Army fighters and two Kawasaki Ki-61 "Tony" Army fighters. Unfortunately, a fifth plane-another "Tojo"-slipped through and, a little after 0900, began a suicide dive, apparently at Ammen. The destroyer opened fire, but the kamikaze maintained his course and gathered speed. Instead of striking Ammen, though, he passed along her length and did a wingover into Stormes crashing her after torpedo mount. Though battered, Stormes remained afloat and, after repairs, continued in active service for almost three decades.

Relative peace returned to radar picket station 15 that night, and continued until early on 27 May when the Japanese launched their eighth kikusui attack-the last in which 100 or more planes were involved. Attacks on other stations began as early as the end of the morning watch. Ammen made no contact with the enemy until about 1730 when she detected an enemy formation approaching Okinawa from the north. No bogies closed her station until after 2000 hours; but, between 2030 and 0200, she and Boyd fought off eight coordinated air attacks and sustained no damage in the effort. By 0330, the radar screen showed the skies to be clear of bogies within an eight-mile radius of Ammen. Forty minutes later, the destroyer headed via Hagushi anchorage to Kerama Retto to refuel and replenish.

Ammen served on radar picket duty for another four weeks. During that time Japanese air activity began to diminish rapidly. The enemy made two more kikusui efforts, both mere shadows of the murderous affairs of April and May but still lethal nonetheless. Enemy planes still ventured within range of her guns and fell victim to them. Efficient American air power directed by radar picket destroyers such as Ammen, however, generally caught them and knocked them out of the air at some distance from the ships around Okinawa. The warship completed her last tour of duty as a radar picket on 23 June. After taking on fuel at Kerama Retto the following morning, she put to sea in company with several other destroyers on their way to Leyte in the Philippines.

=== June 1945 – April 1946 ===
Ammen arrived at Leyte on 27 June and began a fortnight of recreation and upkeep. On 13 July, she got underway from Leyte with TF 95, built around Guam. Her task force arrived at Okinawa on 16 July but returned to sea that same day to conduct a surface anti-shipping sweep of the East China Sea. Following a detour to avoid a typhoon, Ammen and her colleagues began their sweep on 22 July. Unfortunately, they encountered no targets of any consequence and returned to Buckner Bay, Okinawa, on the morning of 24 July. The destroyer participated in two more similarly futile anti-shipping sweeps of the East China Sea during the last days of July and the first week in August.

Following the cessation of hostilities in mid-August, Ammen operated in the Ryukyu Islands until the end of the first week in September. On 7 September, she departed Okinawa on her way to Japan proper, arriving at Nagasaki on the 15th. Six days later, she moved to Sasebo. Ammen served in Japanese waters until 17 November when she embarked upon the voyage back to the United States. Steaming by way of Midway, Pearl Harbor, San Diego, and the Panama Canal, the warship arrived in Charleston, South Carolina, two days before Christmas 1945. After completing inactivation overhaul, Ammen was placed out of commission on 15 April 1946 and was berthed with the Charleston Group, Atlantic Reserve Fleet.

=== 1951–1960 ===
The outbreak of war in Korea in the summer of 1950 and American support for South Korea in that conflict compelled the Navy to expand its active fleet. Preparations for Ammen's reactivation began late in 1950, and she was recommissioned at Charleston, South Carolina, on 5 April 1951. Though officially deemed to be active, the destroyer required three additional months of reconditioning before putting to sea. After refresher training out of Guantánamo Bay, Cuba, in July and August, Ammen returned to Charleston in September for a modernization overhaul that lasted until the spring of 1952. Following refresher training in the West Indies, the warship reported for duty with the Atlantic Fleet as an element of Destroyer Division 182 (DesDiv 182) based at Newport, Rhode Island

On 26 August 1952, Ammen stood out of Newport bound for her first tour of duty in European waters. She cruised in the Mediterranean with the 6th Fleet until early 1953, participating in various training operations and showing the flag in ports on the European, North African, and Middle Eastern coasts of the Mediterranean. The destroyer returned to Newport in February 1953 and operated with the 2d Fleet until August. On 10 August 1953, she departed Boston for the Far East. The warship served with the 7th Fleet, frequently in waters adjacent to the Korean peninsula, through the end of the year. Ammen concluded her tour of duty in the Orient on 14 January 1954. Making the westward voyage by way of the Indian Ocean and the Suez Canal, she arrived in Newport on 10 March. In April, the warship entered the Philadelphia Naval Shipyard for regular overhaul. She completed repairs early that summer and then conducted refresher training in the West Indies in August and September.

That fall, Destroyer Squadron 18 (DesRon 18) was reassigned to the Pacific Fleet. Accordingly, on 30 November 1954, Ammen got underway from Newport in company with her squadron mates to make the transit to San Diego. Upon reporting to the Commander in Chief, Pacific Fleet, after navigating the Panama Canal, DesRon 18 became DesRon 21. In January 1955 the destroyer embarked upon another assignment with the 7th Fleet in the western Pacific. During that assignment, she supported the evacuation of Nationalist Chinese from the Tachen Islands then under pressure from communist forces on the nearby mainland. Before completing that deployment, Ammen also served on the Taiwan Strait patrol.

After her return to San Diego on 19 June 1955, the warship took up normal 1st Fleet operations, conducting type training and participating in fleet exercises in the eastern Pacific. That employment occupied her through January 1956. On 7 February of that year, Ammen left San Diego again on her way to the Far East. That deployment lasted until late July when she headed back to the west coast of the United States. The destroyer reached San Diego on 11 August and, on the 30th, began a three-month overhaul at the Mare Island Naval Shipyard near San Francisco. She returned to San Diego and to active service on 7 December.

On 16 April 1957, Ammen stood out of San Diego bound for another tour of duty with the 7th Fleet in the Far East. En route, she took quite a detour, steaming via Suva in the Fiji Islands to Melbourne, Australia, to participate in the celebration of the 15th anniversary of the Allied victory in the Battle of the Coral Sea. After the commemoration, Ammen headed north via Manus in the Admiralty Islands and Guam to Yokosuka where she arrived on 1 June. A little less than four months later she concluded her assignment with the 7th Fleet and stood out of Yokosuka on 29 September to return to the United States.

Ammen arrived back in San Diego on 14 October and, after post-deployment stand down, resumed normal 1st Fleet operations along the California coast. She remained so occupied until late June 1958. On the 25th, the destroyer got underway again for the western Pacific. She arrived in Yokosuka on 13 July to begin five months of duty with the 7th Fleet. In a deployment plagued by engineering casualties, Ammen still managed extended service at sea with the fast carriers of TF 77 and on the Taiwan Strait patrol. On 6 December, she departed Yokosuka to return to San Diego. Ammen steamed into San Diego on 18 December and remained there exactly 10 weeks completing the usual post-deployment and holiday leave and upkeep period and preparing for regular overhaul.

At the end of February 1959, the destroyer began her overhaul at San Francisco. Repairs complete, she resumed active duty late in June. In mid-August, Ammen departed San Diego for operations between Pearl Harbor and Guam. At the end of September, she returned briefly to the California coast at Long Beach. Early in October, the destroyer embarked upon the final western Pacific deployment of her career. She returned to the west coast from that tour of duty early in 1960. Later that spring the warship began preparations for inactivation.

On 19 July 1960, while making the transit between Seal Beach and San Diego for decommissioning, Ammen was struck by Collett. The collision killed 11 Ammen sailors and injured 20 others. The USCGC Heather (WAGL / WLB-331) participated in the assistance effort. Ammen was initially towed into Long Beach and, later, from there to San Diego where she was decommissioned on 15 September 1960. Ammens name was struck from the Navy List on 1 October 1960, and she was sold to the National Metal and Steel Corporation on 20 April 1961 for scrapping.

== Honors ==
Ammen earned eight battle stars during World War II.
