= United States Naval Shipbuilding Museum =

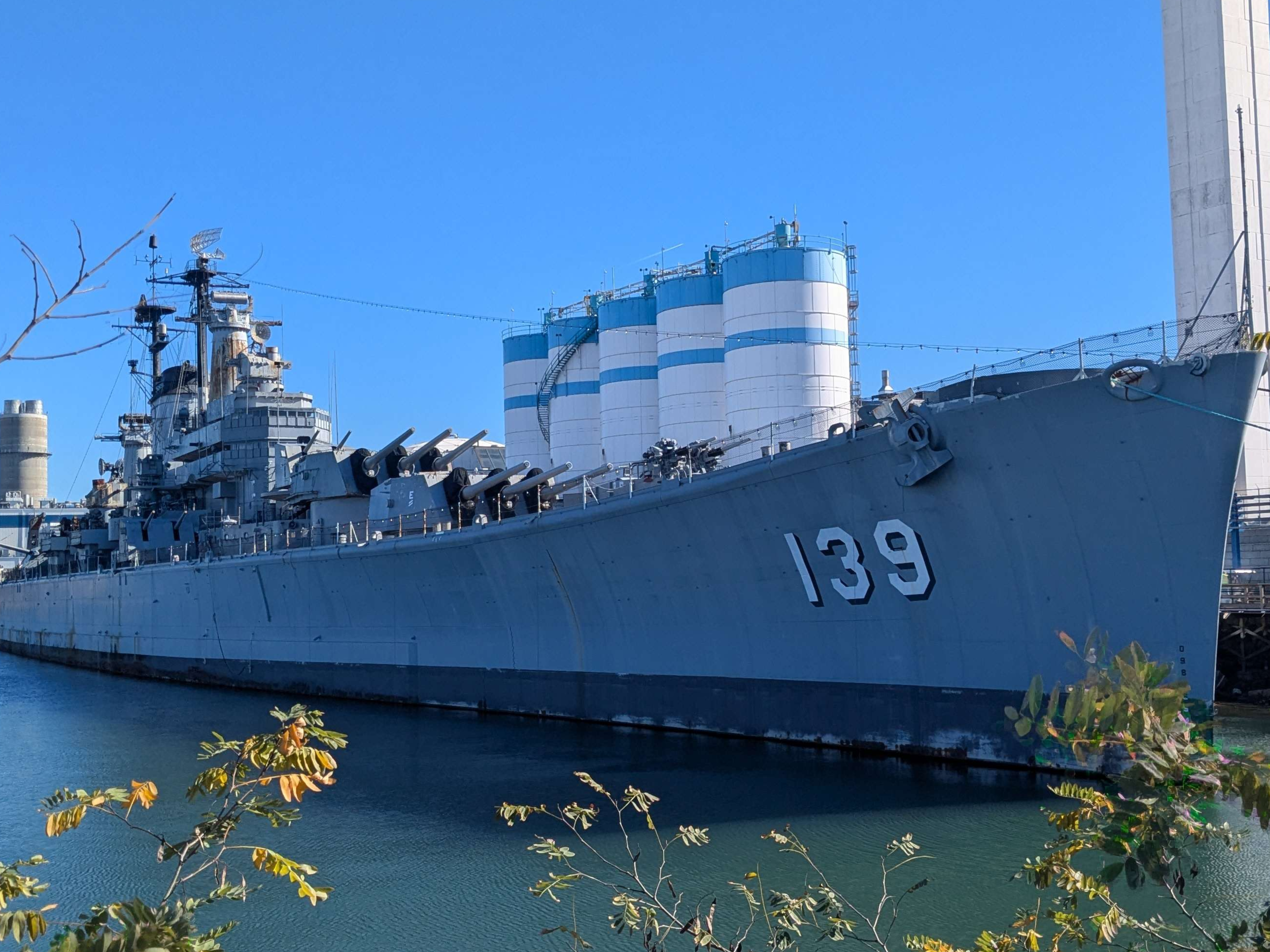
- USS Salem (CA-139)
- Established: January 7, 1993
- Location: Quincy, Massachusetts
- Coordinates: 42.244035°N 70.969888°W
- Type: Museum ship
- Public transit access: Quincy Center (MBTA station); MBTA bus routes 220, 221, 222 (schedules)
- Website: Official website

The United States Naval Shipbuilding Museum is a private non-profit museum in Quincy, Massachusetts featuring USS Salem (CA-139), a heavy cruiser docked at the former Fore River Shipyard where she was laid down in 1945. The museum was established in 1993, in response to efforts by local officials and volunteers to revive the shipyard area after operations at Fore River ended in 1986. Several exhibits are on board Salem relating to United States naval history and shipbuilding. Before being moved to a different pier, the museum featured dockside fixtures and a miniature golf course.

== History ==
In 1986, General Dynamics Corporation shut down its shipbuilding facility at Weymouth Fore River in Quincy, signaling the end of a 102 year history of shipbuilding operations along the Fore River and 85 years at the site in Quincy Point. Various plans were offered at the time for use of the shipyard, but in 1992, a group of volunteers came up with one partial solution: the purchase and relocation of a ship built at the shipyard to be reborn as a museum celebrating the history of the yard. With help from local officials, the museum was established in 1993 by an act of the Massachusetts General Court to "acquire, refurbish and maintain United States naval ships and the adjacent physical complex in order that it will [serve] as a major attraction for local citizens and tourists." After earlier attempts to obtain use of USS Lexington (CV-16), in 1994 the city and the volunteer group successfully negotiated the relocation of Salem from Philadelphia with the Naval Sea Systems Command. On 30 October 1994, Salem returned to Quincy to be permanently docked where she was built nearly five decades before.

== Exhibits and attractions ==
With a length of 717 feet (219 m), Salem provides a large amount of space for museum exhibits and casual exploration by visitors. The Admiral's and Captain's Bridge, Number Three Turret, Second Deck (crew quarters) and Main Deck of Salem are features of the ship proper which are open to visitors. There are also individual exhibits within the ship including the Cruiser Sailor Museum and a substantial model ship collection.

The history of large cruisers like Salem is also addressed. Exhibits honoring USS Newport News (CA-148), the last of the Des Moines-class cruisers, and USS Saint Paul (CA-73), a Baltimore-class cruiser also built at Fore River, are on board. A portion of the museum is devoted to a display of Navy SEAL history. Researchers can request access to extensive military archives and a collection of naval armaments and memorabilia.

Outside the realm of military history, the museum takes advantage of the history of the city which gave the ship its name, Salem, Massachusetts, famous for the witch trials of the late 17th century, by offering holiday themed tours and overnight stays during Halloween. Overnight stays are also available throughout the year for those interested in life aboard a Navy ship. Adjacent to the ship there was an eighteen hole miniature golf course. Operated by the museum, "Kilroy's Mini Golf" was named in honor of James J. Kilroy, a worker at the shipyard who is often cited as the origin of the famous "Kilroy was here" graffiti.

== See also ==
- Portsmouth Naval Shipyard Museum
- U.S. Navy museums
- Other naval museums in the United States
