= John C. Daniel =

John Cheshire Daniel
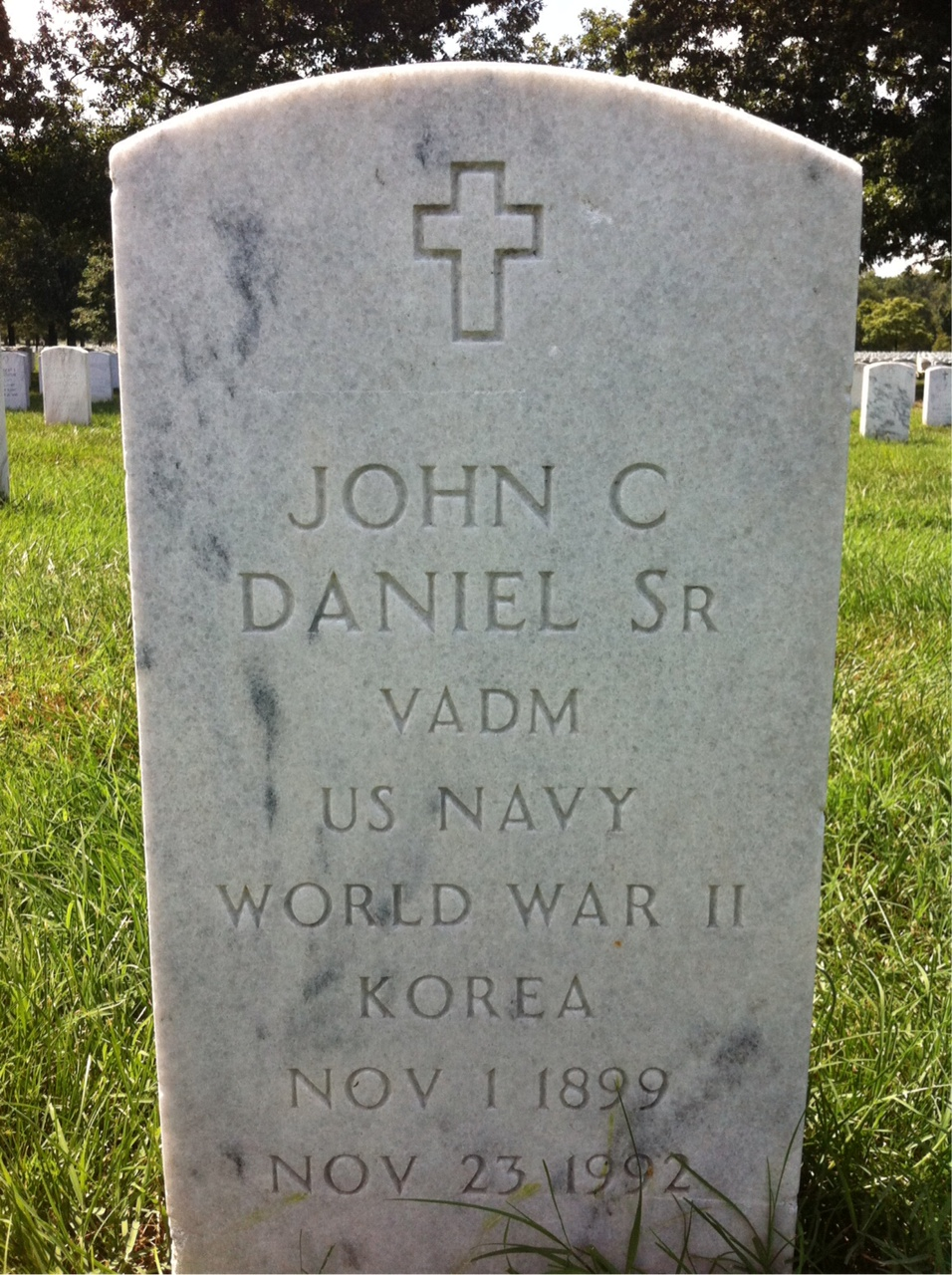
- Grave at Arlington National Cemetery
- Born: 1 November 1899; Philadelphia, Pennsylvania
- Died: 23 November 1992 (aged 93); Fort Lauderdale, Florida
- Burial place: Arlington National Cemetery
- Military career
- Allegiance: United States of America
- Branch: United States Navy
- Service years: 1924–1960
- Rank: Vice Admiral
- Commands: 6th Naval District; USS Salem; USS Ammen
- Conflicts: World War II; Korean War

Vice admiral John Cheshire Daniel (1 November 1899 – 23 November 1992) was a United States Navy officer who served in World War II and the Korean War.

== Early life ==
He was born in Philadelphia in 1899.

== Career ==
He graduated from the United States Naval Academy in 1924.

During World War II he served on destroyers seeing action during the Battle of the Coral Sea where he participated in the rescue of survivors from the USS Lexington, and in the Battle of Midway.

On 20 March 1943 he took command of the destroyer USS Ammen on its commissioning. He commanded Ammen during the landings on Attu and subsequent operations in the Aleutian Islands.

In mid-May 1943 he was appointed commander of the newly formed Operational Naval Demolition Unit and Naval Combat Demolition Unit No. 1 at the Amphibious Training Base, Solomons, Maryland. On 14 May 1943 six officers and 18 enlisted men reported for training from the Seabee training camp at Camp Peary, Virginia. After a four-week course they were sent to participate in Operation Husky, the Allied invasion of Sicily.

He was aboard USS Missouri when the Japanese surrender was signed.

On 14 May 1949 he took command of the cruiser USS Salem on its commissioning.

On 22 June 1952 Daniel joined the United Nations Command ceasefire delegation at Panmunjom replacing Admiral Ruthven E. Libby. On 12 December 1952 he assumed command of COMSTSWESTPACAREA, succeeding Rear Admiral W.F. Paterson. On 6 April 1953 he led the negotiations for the exchange of sick and wounded prisoners that culminated in Operation Little Switch which took place from 20 April to 3 May 1953. He continued to be involved in the ceasefire negotiations leading the signing of the Korean Armistice Agreement on 27 July 1953.

He served as commandant of the 6th Naval District from 28 February 1958 until 30 September 1959.

He retired from the Navy in 1960.

== Later life and death ==
After moving to Fort Lauderdale, Florida after his military retirement, he died on 23 November 1992 at North Beach Hospital there from pneumonia and heart problems. He was buried at Arlington National Cemetery on 30 November 1992.
