= USS Stormes =

Allen M. Sumner-class destroyer

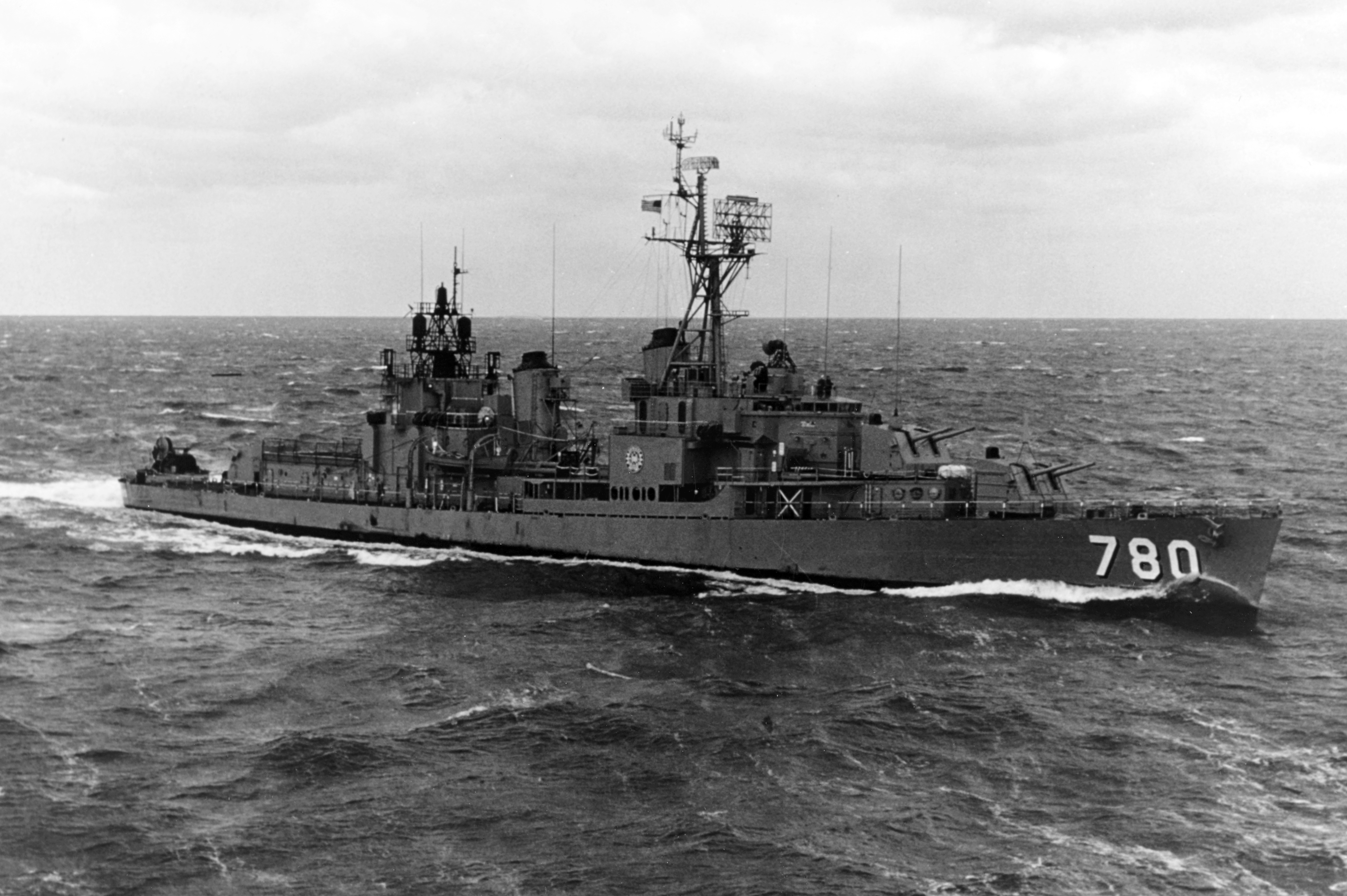
- USS Stormes (DD-780) off Hampton Roads, Virginia on 13 November 1968

History

United States
- Name: Stormes
- Namesake: Max Clifford Stormes
- Builder: Todd Pacific Shipyards, Seattle
- Laid down: 15 February 1944
- Launched: 4 November 1944
- Commissioned: 27 January 1945
- Decommissioned: 5 December 1970
- Stricken: 16 February 1972
- Motto: Versatile Vigilant
- Honours and awards: 5 battle stars
- Fate: Sold to Iran on 16 February 1972

Iran
- Name: Palang
- Namesake: Panthera pardus tulliana
- Acquired: 16 February 1972
- Identification: DDG-9 / D 62
- Fate: Non-operational since 1994 to be scrapped

General characteristics
- Class & type: Allen M. Sumner-class destroyer
- Displacement: 2,200 tons
- Length: 376 ft 6 in (114.76 m)
- Beam: 40 ft (12 m)
- Draft: 15 ft 8 in (4.78 m)
- Propulsion: 60,000 shp (45,000 kW); 2 propellers
- Speed: 34 knots (63 km/h; 39 mph)
- Range: 6,500 nmi (12,000 km; 7,500 mi) at 15 kn (28 km/h; 17 mph)
- Complement: 336
- Armament: 6 × 5 in (127 mm)/38 cal. guns; 12 × 40 mm guns; 11 × 20 mm cannons; 10 × 21 inch (533 mm) torpedo tubes; 2 × depth charge tracks; 6 × depth charge projectors

General characteristics as Palang, 1989
- Class & type: FRAM II Allen M. Summner class
- Displacement: 2,388 tons standard; 3,254 tons full
- Length: 376 ft 5 in (114.73 m)
- Beam: 41 ft (12.50 m)
- Draft: 21 ft 4 in (6.50 m)
- Propulsion: 60,000 shp (45,000 kW); 2 propellers
- Speed: 34 knots (63 km/h; 39 mph)
- Range: 3,740 nmi (6,930 km) at 12.5 knots (23.2 km/h)
- Complement: 290
- Sensors & processing systems: AN/SPS-29C air search radar; AN/SPS-10B surface search radar; AN/SQS-44 sonar
- Electronic warfare & decoys: AN/WLR-1 electronic support measures; AN/ULQ-6 electronic countermeasure
- Armament: 4 × Standard SM-1MR SAM launchers with 8 missiles; 4 × 5-inch (127 mm)/38 DP guns; 4 × 14.5 mm AA guns; 6 × 12.75-inch (324 mm) Mk 32 torpedo tubes for Mark 46 torpedo; 2 × Hedgehog Mk 10 ASW mortars
- Aircraft carried: 1 × Agusta AB 204AS helicopter

USS Stormes (DD-780) was an Allen M. Sumner-class destroyer that served in the United States Navy.

== Namesake ==
Max Clifford Stormes was born on 27 July 1903 in Big Flats, New York. He was appointed midshipman at the United States Naval Academy on 15 June 1920 and graduated on 15 May 1924. He was assigned to USS Nevada and subsequently served on USS Chewink and USS S-33. He served with Submarine Division 20 in 1929 and 1930 and then attended a post-graduate course at the United States Naval Academy in 1931 and 1932. His next tour of sea duty was as commanding officer of USS Talbot followed by a tour on USS Chicago as damage control officer.

He became commanding officer of USS Preston on 31 October 1941 and was promoted to commander on 20 August 1942. He was killed in action during the night of 14 and 15 November 1942, when Preston was sunk in the Naval Battle of Guadalcanal. He was posthumously awarded the Navy Cross.

== Construction and commissioning ==
Stormes was laid down on 15 February 1944 by Todd-Pacific Shipyards Inc., Seattle, Washington; launched on 4 November 1944; sponsored by Mrs. M. C. Stormes; and commissioned on 27 January 1945.

== Service history ==
=== World War II ===
Stormes was fitted out at Seattle and departed there on 14 February for the San Diego Bay area where she held her shakedown training. Upon completion of her shakedown, she sailed on 1 April for Bremerton, Washington for a post-shakedown overhaul. Dock trials were held on the morning of 22 April; and, that afternoon, the destroyer put to sea, en route to Hawaii.

Stormes arrived at Pearl Harbor on 30 April and sailed the next day as escort for the cruiser Louisville en route to Okinawa, via Guam. The two ships arrived at Hagushi anchorage off Southwestern Okinawa on 23 May and joined the 5th Fleet.

==== Okinawa kamikaze strike ====
The destroyer was immediately assigned to the antiaircraft screen. She spent the night in the anchorage and took her position in the screen the next day. The ship underwent her first air raid that evening. The weather was bad on the morning of 25 May with poor visibility and intermittent rain squalls. At 0905, a Japanese plane was sighted as it passed between two US Navy planes and headed for Ammen directly ahead of Stormes. At the last moment, the plane turned and crashed into Stormes's aft torpedo mount. Its bomb exploded in the magazine under her number three 5-inch mount. The ship was on fire, and sea water poured through holes in the hull. By noon, repair parties had extinguished the fires and plugged the holes. Twenty-one members of the crew were killed and 15 injured.

The battered destroyer slowly made her way back to Kerama Retto. She remained there until 5 July when she moved to Buckner Bay to enter a floating drydock. The ship left drydock on 13 August and was sufficiently seaworthy for the long trip back to the United States, even though only her port shaft was in commission. Stormes stood out of Buckner Bay on 17 August and steamed, via Saipan, Eniwetok, and Pearl Harbor, to San Francisco. She arrived at Hunters Point on 17 September and began a three-month overhaul.

The destroyer held refresher training in the San Diego area and, in January 1946, sailed for the east coast. She arrived at Guantanamo Bay, Cuba, on 14 January, and, before continuing to Norfolk, Virginia acted as a plane guard for aircraft carriers holding shakedown operations in the area.

Stormes arrived at Norfolk on 1 February and spent the remainder of the month preparing for Operation "Frostbite" which was to take place in March. USS Midway, a tanker, Stormes, and two other destroyers, moved into an area between Greenland, Labrador, and Hudson Strait in March to test carrier operations in sub-zero temperatures. Upon completion of the operation, Stormes steamed to the Brooklyn Navy Yard for upkeep. On 11 April, she sailed to Casco Bay, Maine, for training and returned for a major overhaul. On 22 July, she sailed to Guantanamo Bay for refresher training and returned to Norfolk on 9 September. In October 1946, the destroyer escorted Philippine Sea to Guantanamo Bay for the carrier's shakedown.

In January 1947, Stormes participated in an exercise at Guantanamo Bay and returned to the Caribbean the following month for a fleet exercise. The destroyer carried out routine fleet duties from her Norfolk base until 1950. In August, she sailed to Charleston, South Carolina, for inactivation.

=== Korean War ===
However, she was reactivated in September due to the Korean War. In December 1950, she began a three-month yard overhaul at Charleston which was followed by a six-week shakedown cruise. In May 1951, the destroyer sailed to the west coast and was routed onward to join the 7th Fleet off Korea.

Stormes operated with Task Force 77, shelling enemy lines, screening large fleet units, rescuing downed pilots, and performing antisubmarine duties until January 1952 when she returned to Norfolk.

While on protection detail in Wonsan Harbor as support for the Marine observation team on a small island, Stormes was involved in the rescue operation of a B-29 bomber that had been shot down while returning from a mission. Of the eleven man crew, seven of the crew were rescued, the others were killed outright by gun fire from the Migs. The survivors parachuted into the sea off the coast and subsequently picked up by Stormes and other ships in the immediate area.

Stormes made a midshipman cruise to England and France that summer and then operated along the Atlantic seaboard until June 1953 when she entered the Norfolk Navy Yard for a four-month yard period and its subsequent shakedown.

In February 1954, the destroyer embarked on a world cruise which took her to Naples, Suez, Port Said, Aden, Colombo, Singapore, Yokosuka, Sasebo, Midway, and Pearl Harbor. She reached San Francisco in July and returned to Norfolk in August.

Stormes sailed, on 4 January 1955, for the Caribbean to participate in Operation "Springboard 55." She operated with Valley Forge in Antisubmarine Group 3 from 4 January to August. The destroyer participated in a NATO exercise in early September and then continued local operations until February 1956 when she entered the Norfolk Navy Yard. Stormes left the shipyard in May and sailed to Guantanamo Bay for refresher training which lasted until July. From then to November, the ship participated in local exercises to maintain her state of readiness in anticipation of an overseas tour.

On 7 November, Stormes sailed with Destroyer Division 261 and arrived at Naples, Italy, a month later where she was attached to the 6th Fleet. She served with the fast carriers in the Mediterranean until returning to Norfolk on 20 February 1957. The ship operated along the east coast until 3 September when she sailed as part of an attack carrier strike force for Operation "Seaspray." After crossing the North Atlantic, the ships arrived at the River Clyde, Scotland, where a number of NATO ships were waiting to take part in Operation "Strikeback." The operation ended in late September, and the destroyer sailed to Gibraltar to join the 6th Fleet for her second tour which ended at Norfolk on 22 December 1957.

Stormes remained in port until 27 January 1958 when she embarked on a two-week exercise with other ships of DesDiv 261. The remainder of the year and part of 1959 saw the destroyer taking part in local and fleet operations from New York to the Caribbean. On 7 August 1959, she sailed for her third tour with the 6th Fleet which terminated upon her return to Norfolk on 26 February 1960. The ship entered the Navy Yard on 3 June for a FRAM II conversion which lasted until 5 January 1961. On 24 January, she sailed for Guantanamo Bay where she held refresher training, gunnery practice, and participated in group exercises.

Stormes sailed for Norfolk, via Key West, and arrived there on 1 April. She operated with fleet units on the east coast and in the Caribbean for the remainder of the year. The highlight of the year's activities came in November when Stormes was designated to recover a spacecraft carrying a chimpanzee named Enos, the first chimpanzee to orbit the Earth. The spacecraft landed approximately 30 miles from the destroyer. Stormes, aided by an aircraft which had the capsule in sight, recovered it and Enos who was in good health. The ship spent the next year operating with Task Group Alpha, a hunter-killer group developing the antisubmarine readiness of the fleet.

On 9 November 1962, Stormes joined the Cuban Blockade and continued that duty until the end of the Cuban Missile Crisis. She then resumed her regular operations. In August of the following year, "the 780" became the first United States ship to visit Santa Marta, Colombia, since 1880. In the latter part of 1963, she underwent an overhaul. She operated with Task Group Alpha in 1964 until October when she participated in Operation "Steel-pike." Her task group acted as the hunter-killer group that preceded the main body of ships as they crossed the Atlantic.

Stormes continued operating with Task Group Alfa until May 1965 when she was ordered to patrol the coastal waters of the Dominican Republic during the revolution there. When relieved of patrol duty, she returned to Norfolk and prepared for a deployment period. She was with the 6th Fleet from June to August and returned to her homeport in early September. On 1 June 1966, Stormes stood out of Norfolk with DesRon 32 for a six and one-half month deployment to the western Pacific.

=== Vietnam ===
While in WestPac, her primary duty was plane guard for Constellation in the Tonkin Gulf. At one time, she was called on to provide gunfire support to ground forces ashore for a three-day period. She returned to Norfolk, via the Mediterranean, on 17 December 1966. After east coast operations in the spring and summer of 1967, Stormes deployed to the 6th Fleet from 14 November 1967 to 23 April 1968. She sailed to South America in July 1968 to hold antisubmarine warfare operations as part of UNITAS IX and to visit ports in Puerto Rico, Brazil, and St. Lucia. After resuming her normal operations from Norfolk in September, Stormes deployed to the Mediterranean with DesRon 32 on 6 January 1969. The six-month tour ended upon her return to Norfolk on 31 May. The remainder of the year and into June 1970, she operated from her homeport as a dedicated participant of the Squeeze Play ASW exercises. When Stormes returned to Norfolk from her last east coast port call on 18 June, she began preparing for inactivation.

=== Transfer to Iran ===
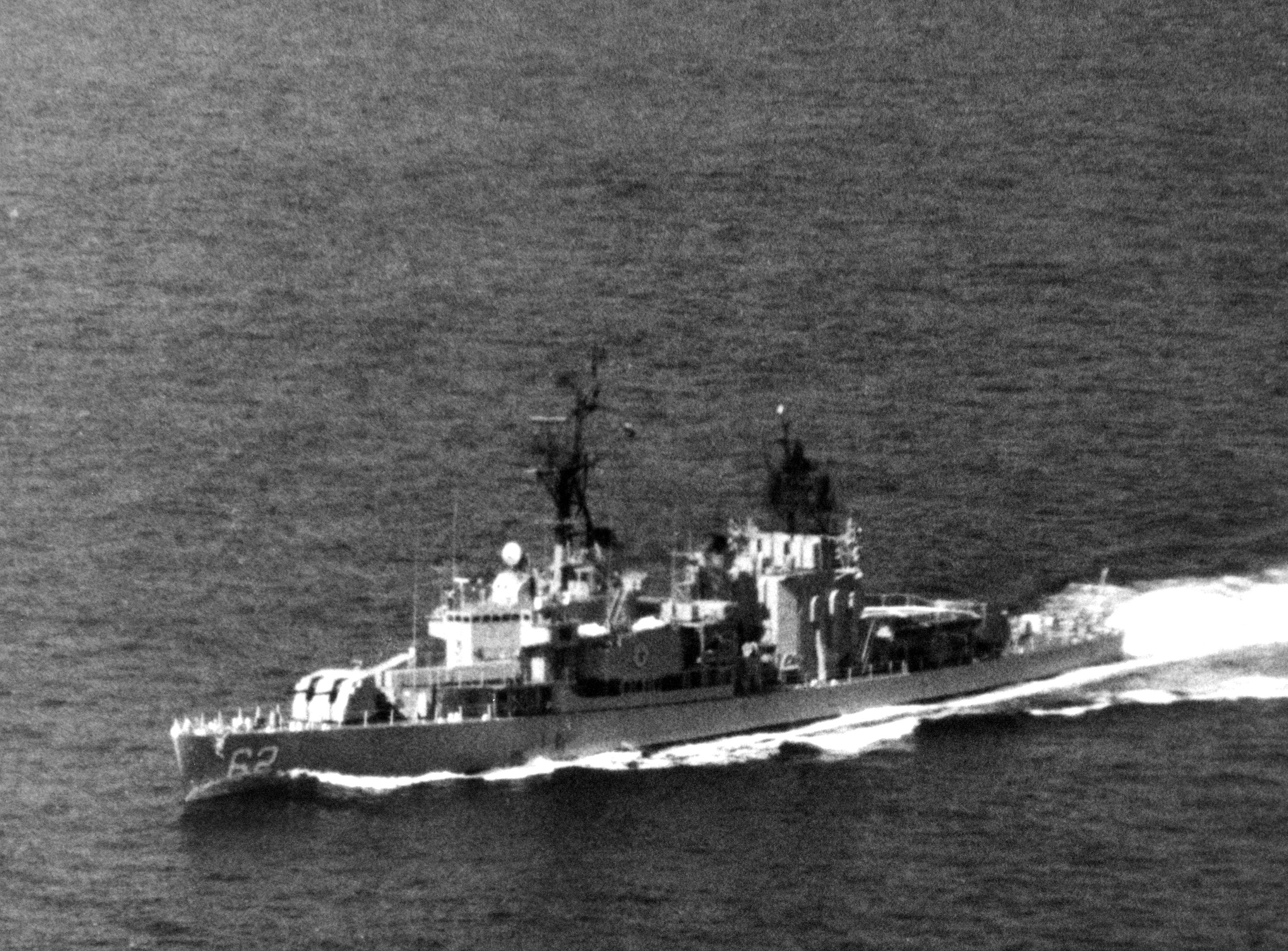
Palang (D 62) underway in 1987

Stormes was removed from active status and placed on the reserve list on 5 December 1970. She was struck from the Navy list on 16 February 1972. Stormes was sold to Iran on 16 February 1972 and served as Palang (Leopard) (DDG-9/62) until 1994.

== Awards ==
Stormes received one battle star for World War II, three for service in Korea, and one for service in Vietnam.

== See also ==
Current Iranian Navy vessels
