= American School of Las Palmas =

Coordinates: 28.040975°N 15.445534°W

American School of Las Palmas Spanish: Colegio Americano de Las Palmas

Information
- Established: 1967; 58 years ago
- Grades: Nursery - Grade 12
- Language: English
- Website: https://www.americanschooloflaspalmas.org/

The American School of Las Palmas (ASLP, Spanish: Colegio Americano de Las Palmas) is an American international school in Las Palmas, Canary Islands, Spain. It serves levels nursery through grade twelve.

== History ==
The school was founded in 1967.
