= American Soccer League =

American Soccer League may refer to:

- American Soccer League (1921–1933), from 1921 to 1933
- American Soccer League (1933–1983), from 1933 to 1983
- American Soccer League (1988–1989), from 1988 to 1989
- American Soccer League (2014–2017), from 2014 to 2017

== See also ==
- American League of Professional Football, a soccer league in 1894
