= USS Des Moines (CA-134) =

Early Cold War-era heavy cruiser of the United States Navy

Coordinates: 41.7029543°N 93.7116003°W

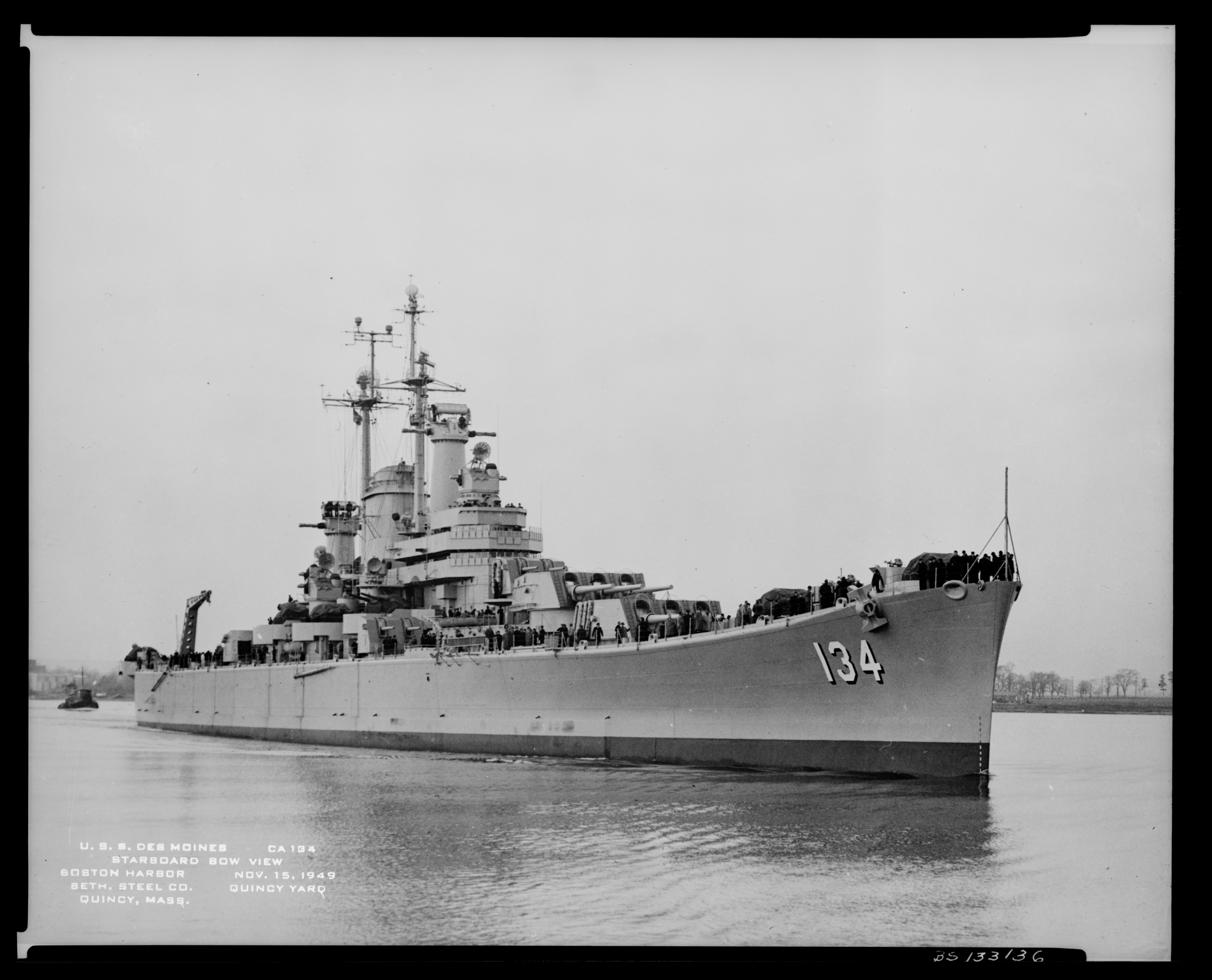
- USS Des Moines

History

United States
- Name: Des Moines
- Namesake: Des Moines, Iowa
- Ordered: 25 September 1943
- Builder: Bethlehem Steel Company
- Laid down: 28 May 1945
- Launched: 27 September 1946
- Commissioned: 16 November 1948
- Decommissioned: 6 July 1961
- Stricken: 9 July 1991
- Identification: Callsign: NHSG; Hull number: CA-134
- Honours and awards: See Awards
- Fate: Scrapped, 16 August 2007
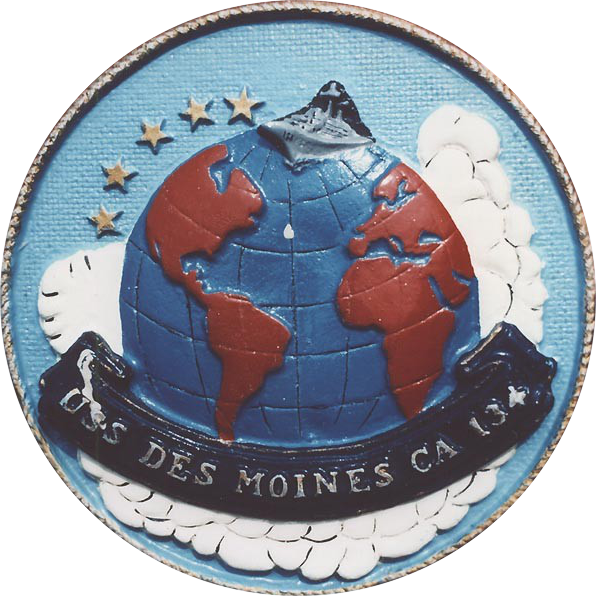
- Badge

General characteristics
- Class & type: Des Moines-class heavy cruiser
- Displacement: 17,255 long tons (17,532 t) (standard); 20,933 long tons (21,269 t) (full load)
- Length: 700 ft (210 m) wl; 716 ft 6 in (218.39 m) oa
- Beam: 76 ft 6 in (23.32 m)
- Draft: 22 ft (6.7 m)
- Propulsion: 4 shafts; General Electric turbines; 4 boilers; 120,000 shp (89,000 kW)
- Speed: 33 kn (61 km/h)
- Range: 10,500 nmi at 15 knots; 19,400 km at 28 km/h
- Boats & landing craft carried: 2-4 × lifeboats
- Complement: 1,799 officers and enlisted
- Sensors & processing systems: AN/SPS-6 air-search radar; AN/SPS-8A height-finding radar; AN/SPS-29 early-warning radar; AN/URN-3 TACAN; AN/URD-4 radio direction finder
- Armament: 3 × triple 8-inch/55-caliber guns; 6 × twin 5-inch/38-caliber guns; 12 × twin 3-inch/50-caliber guns; 12 × single Oerlikon 20 mm cannons
- Armor: Belt: 4-6 in (102-152 mm); Deck: 3.5 in (89 mm); Turrets: 2-8 in (51-203 mm); Barbettes: 6.3 in (160 mm); Conning tower: 6.5 in (165 mm)
- Aviation facilities: 2 × aircraft catapults; Helipad (later conversion)

USS Des Moines (CA-134) was the lead ship of the class of United States Navy (USN) heavy cruisers. She was the first USN ship to mount the auto-loading 8-inch (203 mm) Mark 16 guns, the first large-caliber auto-loading guns in the world. She was the second ship of the USN to be commissioned with the name of the city of Des Moines, capital of Iowa. Launched 1946, she was commissioned in 1948. She saw duty around the world until her decommissioning in 1961 when she was permanently mothballed. A 1981 survey was done to determine if she was worthy of reactivation for the 600-ship Navy, but the cost was too great so she remained in the reserve. She was struck from the Naval Vessel Register in 1993, which was followed by a campaign to turn her into a museum ship. The campaign failed, and in 2005 she was sold for scrapping, and she was broken up by July 7. Parts of the ship have been donated to various places for display, including at the USS Salem museum, which is the only Des Moines-class ship to avoid the scrapyard.

== Construction and career ==
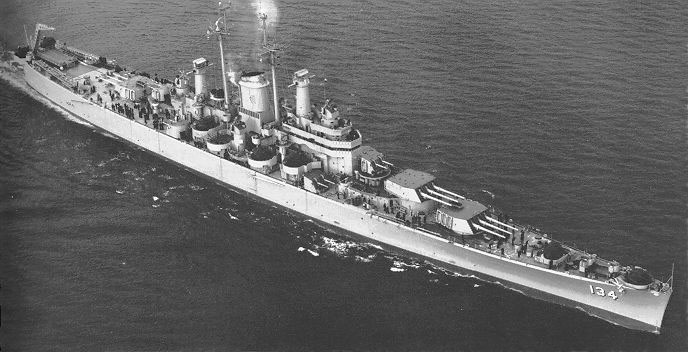
Des Moines underway at sea on 15 November 1948

Des Moines was launched 27 September 1946 by Bethlehem Steel Company, Fore River Shipyard, Quincy, Massachusetts; sponsored by Mrs. E. T. Meredith, Jr.; and commissioned 16 November 1948. She became the first of her class to mount the semi-automatic Mark 16 8-inch turrets and carry the new Sikorsky HO3S-1 utility helicopters in place of seaplanes. She was named after the capital of the state of Iowa.

In a varied operating schedule designed to maintain the readiness of the Navy to meet the constant demands of defense and foreign policy, Des Moines cruised from her home port at Newport, Rhode Island and after 1950, from Norfolk, Virginia on exercises of every type in the Caribbean, along the East Coast, in the Mediterranean Sea, and in North Atlantic waters. Annually between 1949 and 1957 she deployed to the Mediterranean, during the first seven years serving as flagship for the 6th Task Fleet (known as the 6th Fleet from 1950). In 1952, and each year from 1954 to 1957, she carried midshipmen for summer training cruises, crossing to Northern European ports on the first four cruises. She also sailed to Northern Europe on NATO exercises in 1952, 1953, and 1955. On 18 February 1958, she cleared Norfolk for the Mediterranean once more, this time to remain as flagship for the 6th Fleet until July 1961 when she was placed out of commission in reserve.

Through her Mediterranean services Des Moines contributed significantly to the success of the 6th Fleet in representing American power and interests in the countries of Southern Europe, Northern Africa, and the Near East. She made this contribution through such activities as her participation in NATO Mediterranean exercises; her call to seldom-visited Rijeka, Yugoslavia, in December 1950 and Dubrovnik, Yugoslavia, in May 1960, and to many other ports as a regular feature of her schedule; her cruising in the eastern Atlantic during the wake of the Suez Crisis of 1956; and service on patrol and as control center for American forces in the Lebanon crisis of 1958.

Film footage of her cruising with other ships of the United States 6th Fleet was used in the introduction and conclusion of the movie John Paul Jones, starring Robert Stack (Warner Brothers 1959).

=== Decommissioning ===
After decommissioning in 1961 she was mothballed in the South Boston Naval Annex and eventually laid up in the Naval Inactive Ship Maintenance Facility at Philadelphia in maintained reserve. In 1981 the United States Congress directed that the Navy conduct a survey to determine if she and sister ship Salem could be reactivated (in lieu of two Iowa-class battleship) to support the 600-ship Navy proposed by the Reagan Administration. The study concluded that while both ships would be useful in the active fleet, there was not enough deck space to add the modern weapons systems (Tomahawk cruise missiles, Harpoon anti-ship missiles, Phalanx CIWS mounts, radars and communication systems) that the ships would need to operate in a 1980s environment. In addition, the per-ship costs for the reactivation and updates (that were determined feasible) would be close to the costs for an Iowa, for a much less capable ship. Therefore, both ships remained in maintained reserve until they were struck off the reserve list in August 1993.

After an attempt to turn her into a museum ship in Milwaukee, Wisconsin failed, she was sold in 2005, and then towed to Brownsville, Texas, for scrapping. By July 2007, she had been completely broken up. Her status officially changed to "disposed of by scrapping, dismantling" on 16 August 2007. Two of her dual 5-inch/38 gun mounts were donated to the USS Lexington museum in Corpus Christi, Texas, where they can now be seen on display.

Her sister ship Newport News was scrapped in New Orleans in 1993. The third Des Moines-class ship, Salem, is a museum ship in Quincy, Massachusetts.

USS Des Moines ' bell, nameplate and plaque are on display at Camp Dodge, Johnston, Iowa. The USS Des Moines ' port anchor resides in the roundabout at the entrance to Quincy, Massachusetts, which is adjacent to the USS Salem Museum.

== Gallery ==
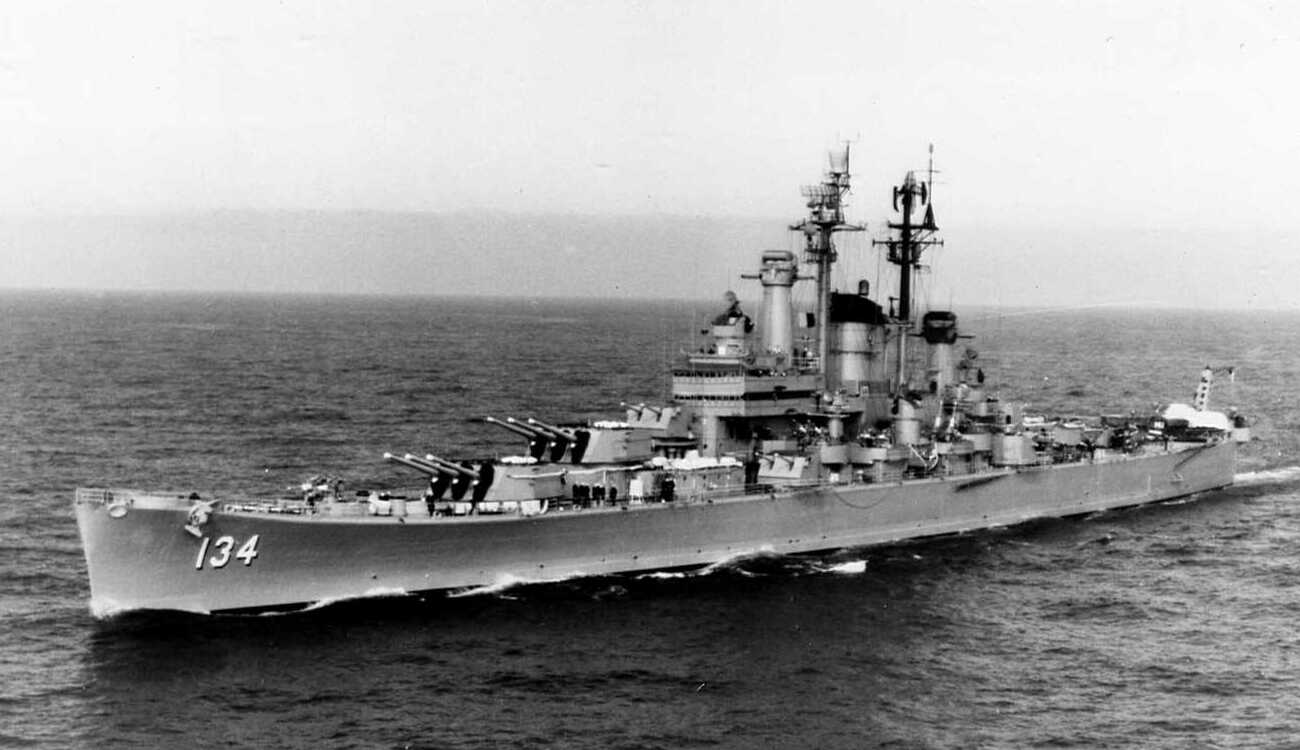
Des Moines underway at sea, circa in the late 1950s

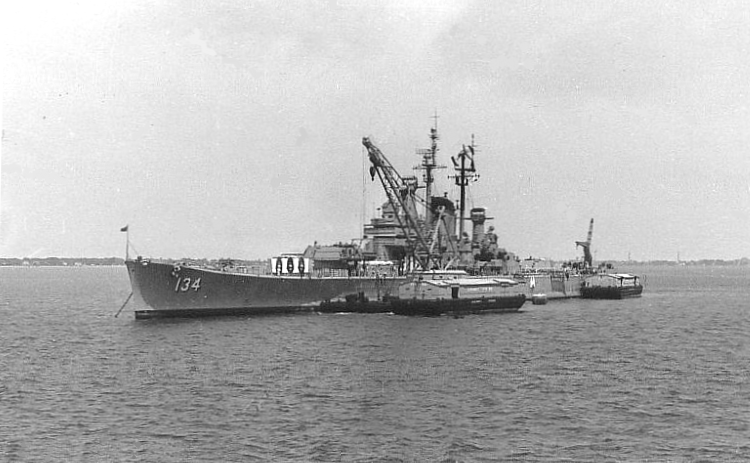
Des Moines at anchor off Newport News, Virginia in 1957

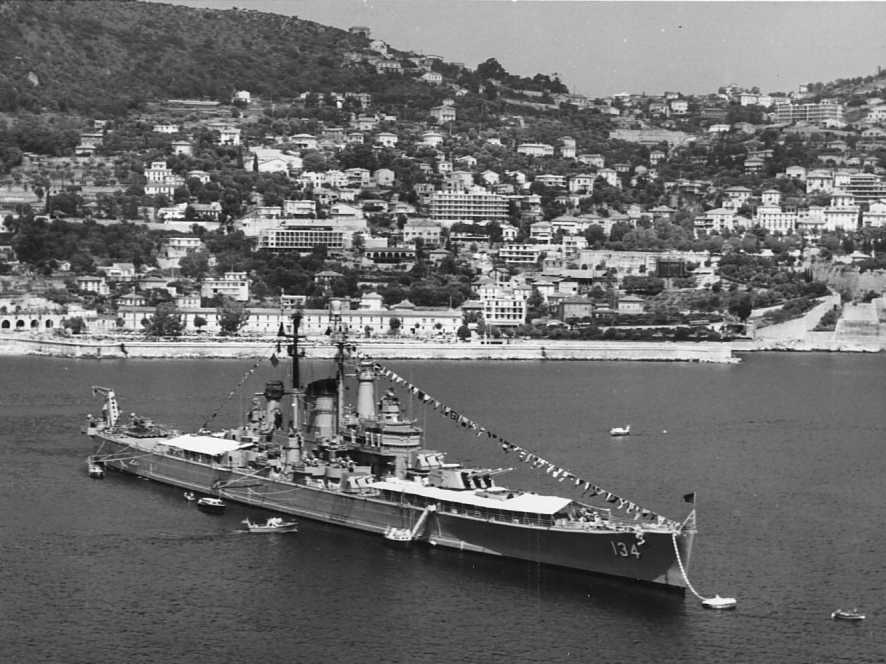
Des Moines at anchor off Villefranche, in July 1959

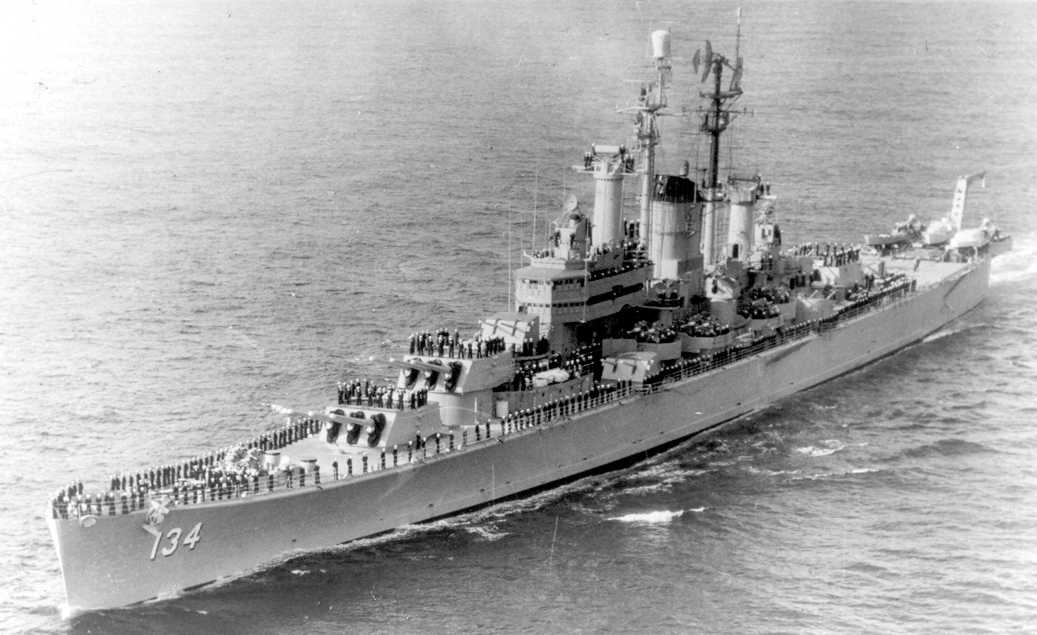
Des Moines underway at sea on 30 November 1959

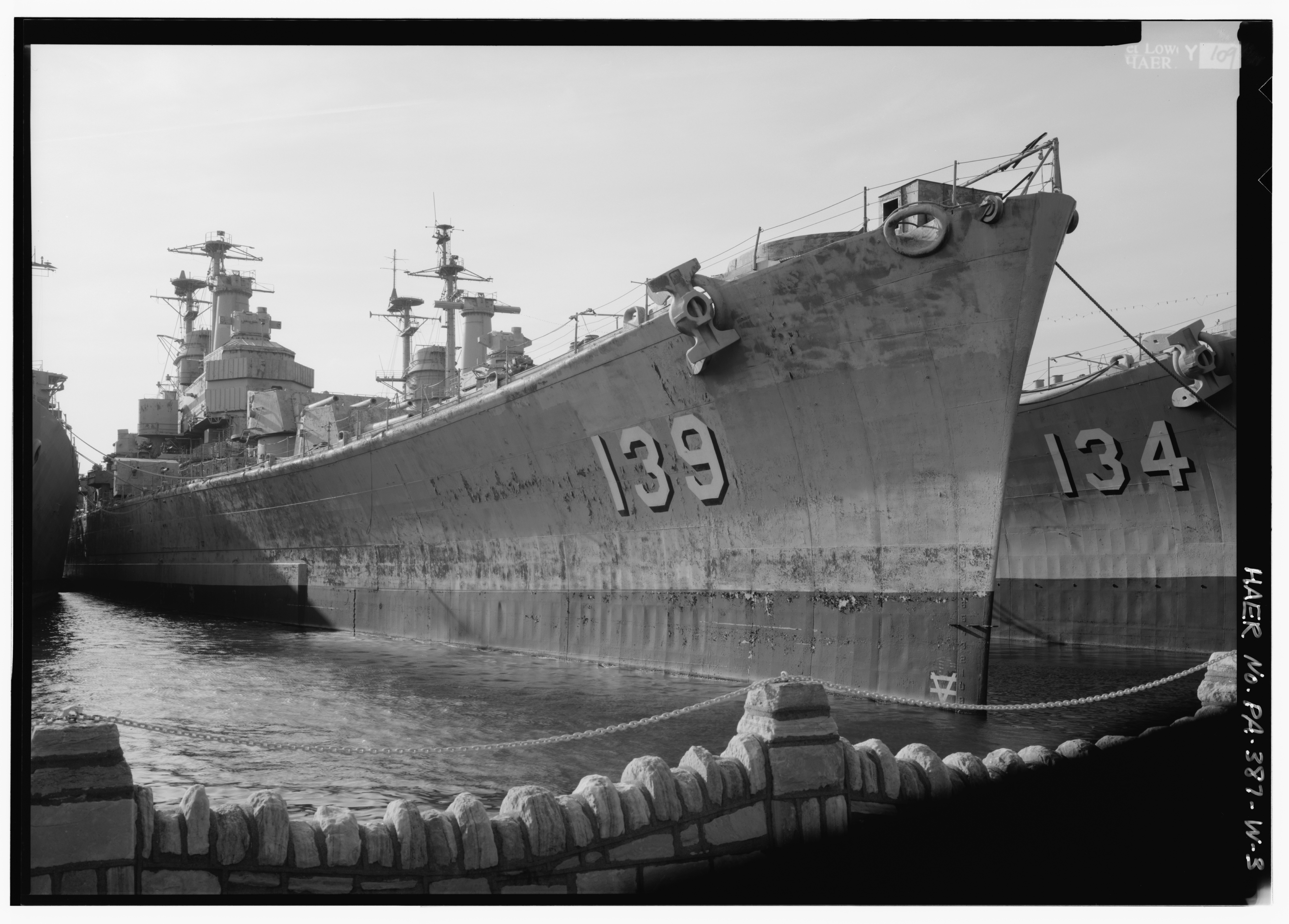
Salem and Des Moines laid up in 1995

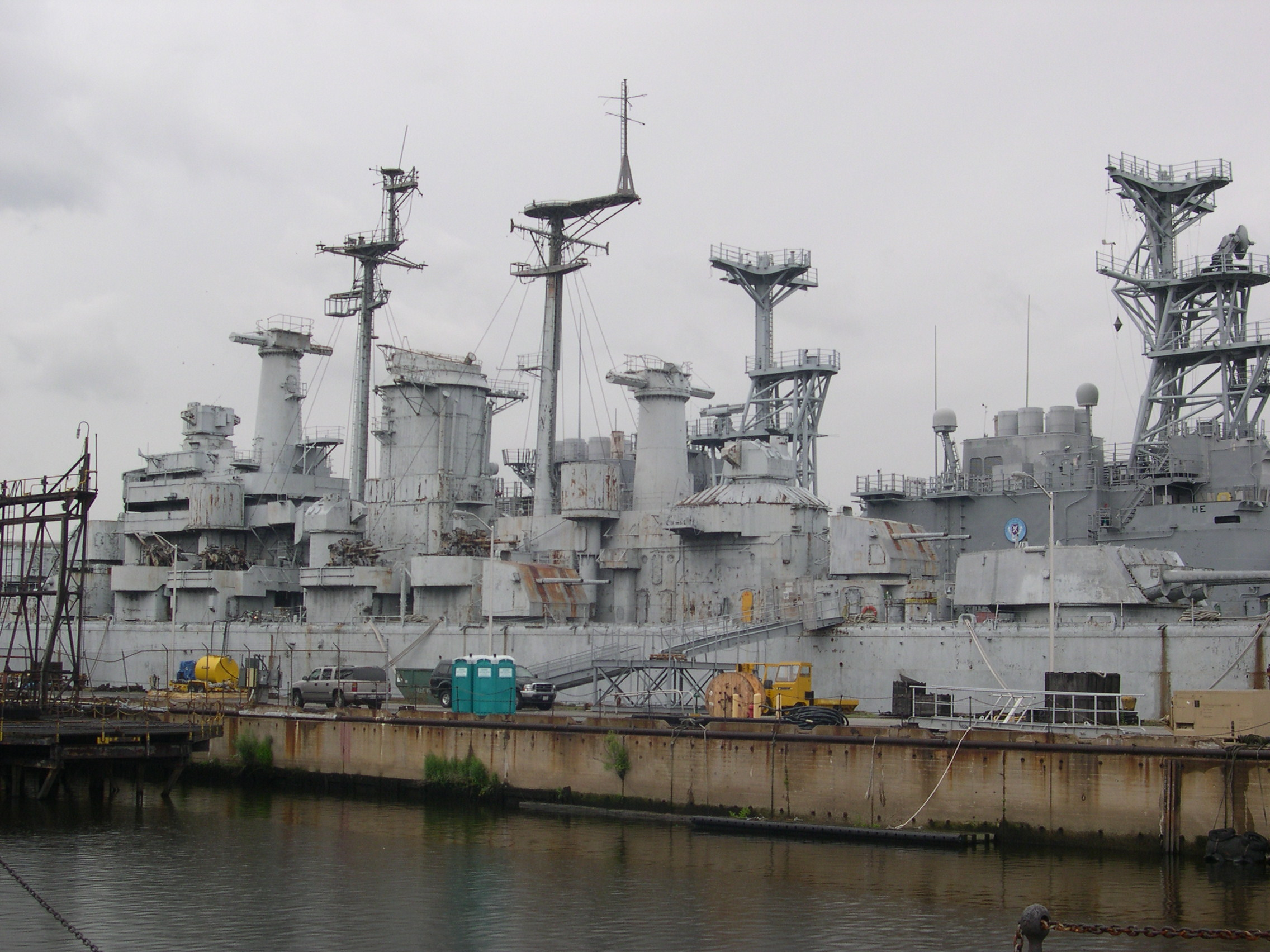
Des Moines laid up at Philadelphia, Pennsylvania on 11 June 2004

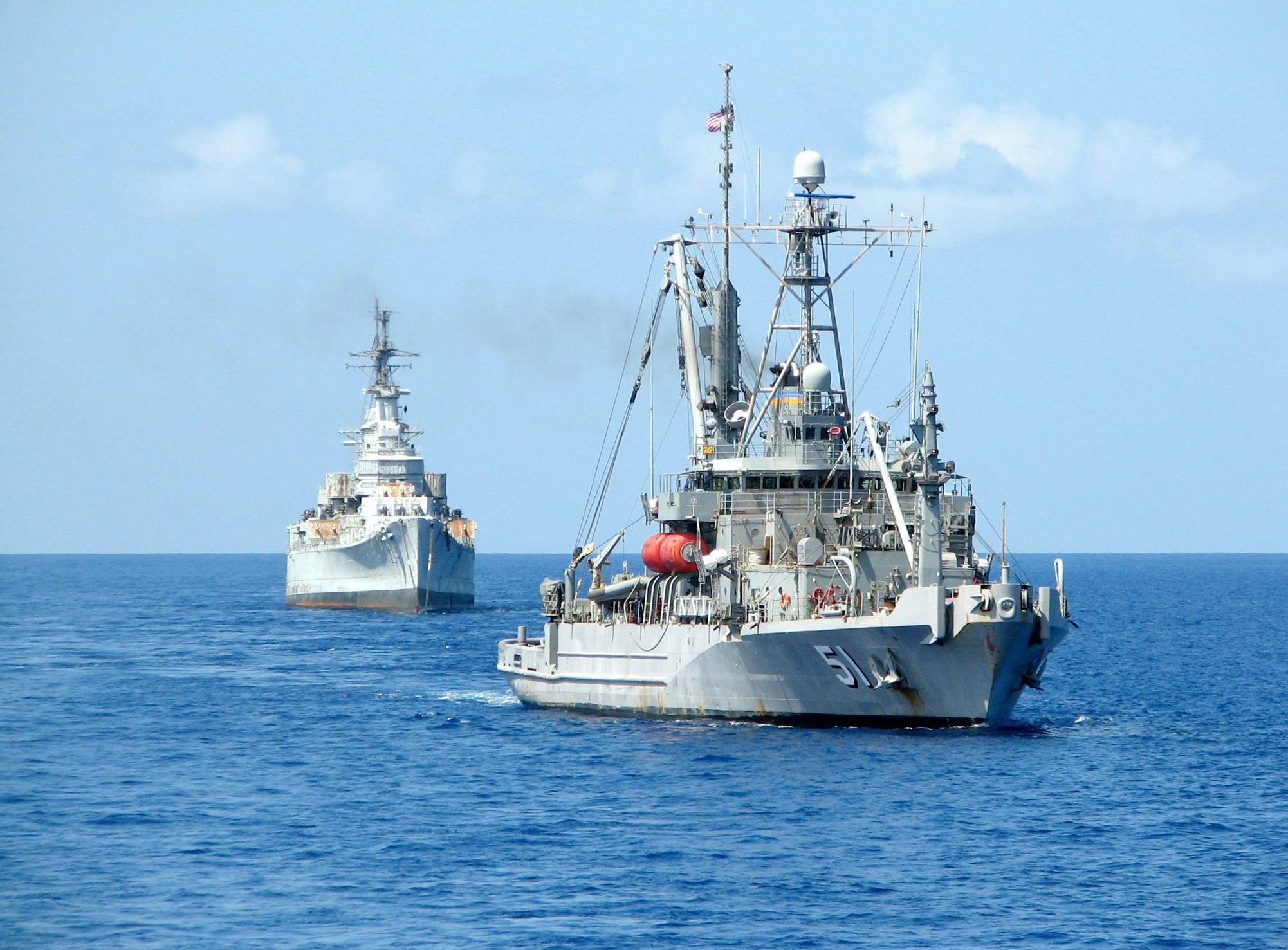
Des Moines being towed to the scrapyard, in October 2006

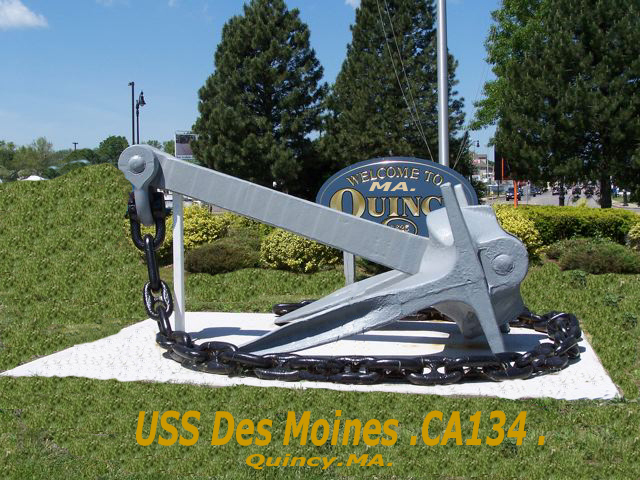
Des Moines' anchor at USS Salem Museum, Quincy

== Awards ==
- Navy Occupation Medal with (Asia and Europe clasps)
- National Defense Service Medal
- Armed Forces Expeditionary Medal

== In popular culture ==
On 27 February 2026, the VTuber Desiree134VT debuted under the VFleet Project as a character representing USS Des Moines (CA-134). VFleet Project's stated goals include raising awareness of and support for nonprofit foundations responsible for the preservation and restoration of historic ship museums.
