= Adobe Source Libraries =

Adobe Source Libraries are a set of libraries initially developed by Adobe for internal use and later made open source.

These libraries provide functionality to specify a GUI's definition and behavior. They are organized around the two main modules Adam and Eve.

- Adam offers the ability to specify the state chart driving a GUI element behavior.
- Eve offers a GUI description language and a parser able to generate the described GUI from that description.
