= USS Salem (CA-139) =

Des Moines–class cruiser of the United States Navy

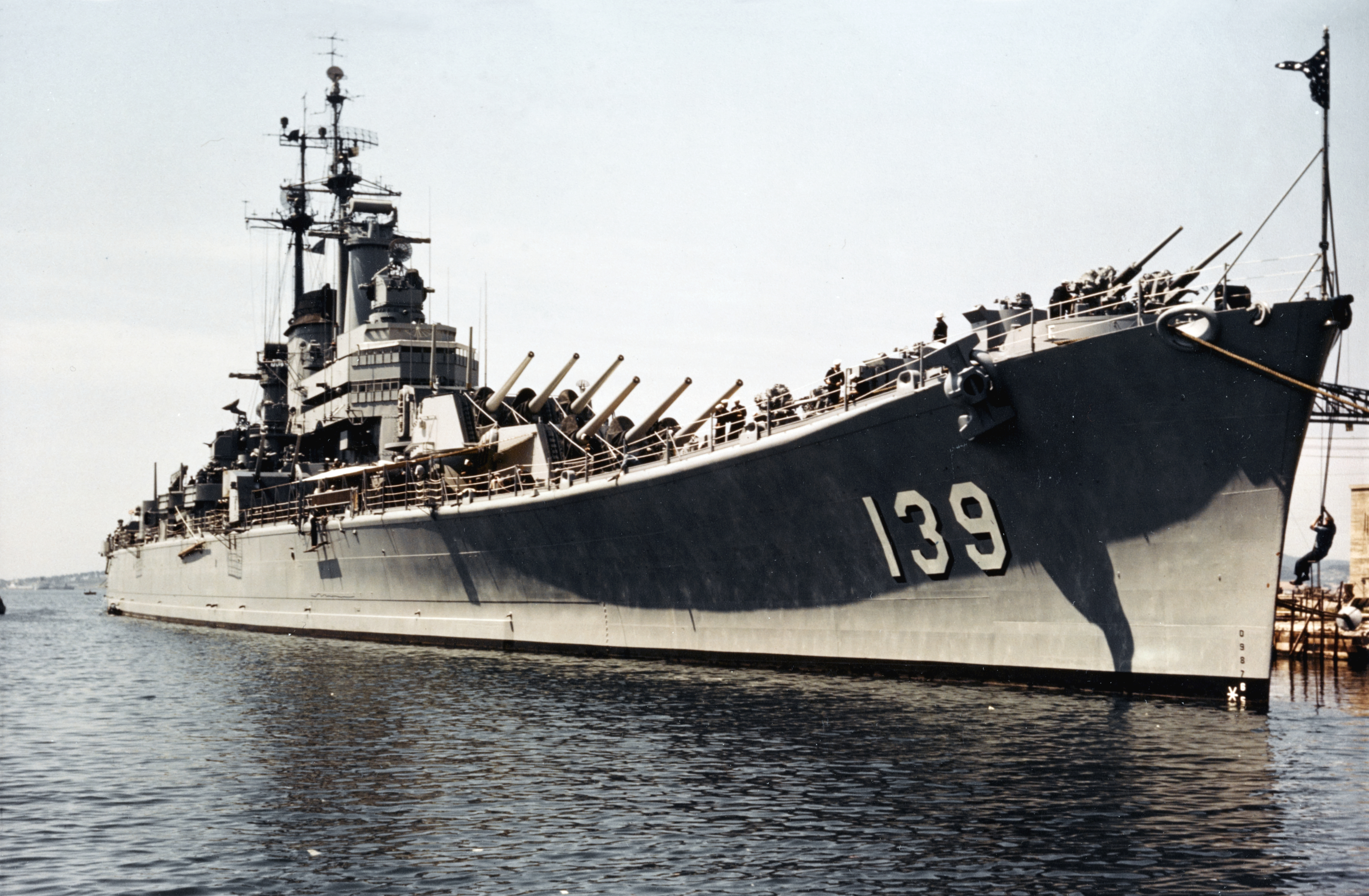
- USS Salem at Toulon, 18 June 1951

History

United States
- Name: Salem
- Namesake: Salem, Massachusetts
- Ordered: 14 June 1943
- Builder: Bethlehem Steel Co.'s Fore River Shipyard
- Laid down: 4 July 1945
- Launched: 25 March 1947
- Commissioned: 14 May 1949
- Decommissioned: 30 January 1959
- Stricken: 7 December 1991
- Identification: Callsign: NIQY; Hull number: CA-139
- Status: Museum ship in Quincy, Massachusetts 42°14′39″N 70°58′12″W
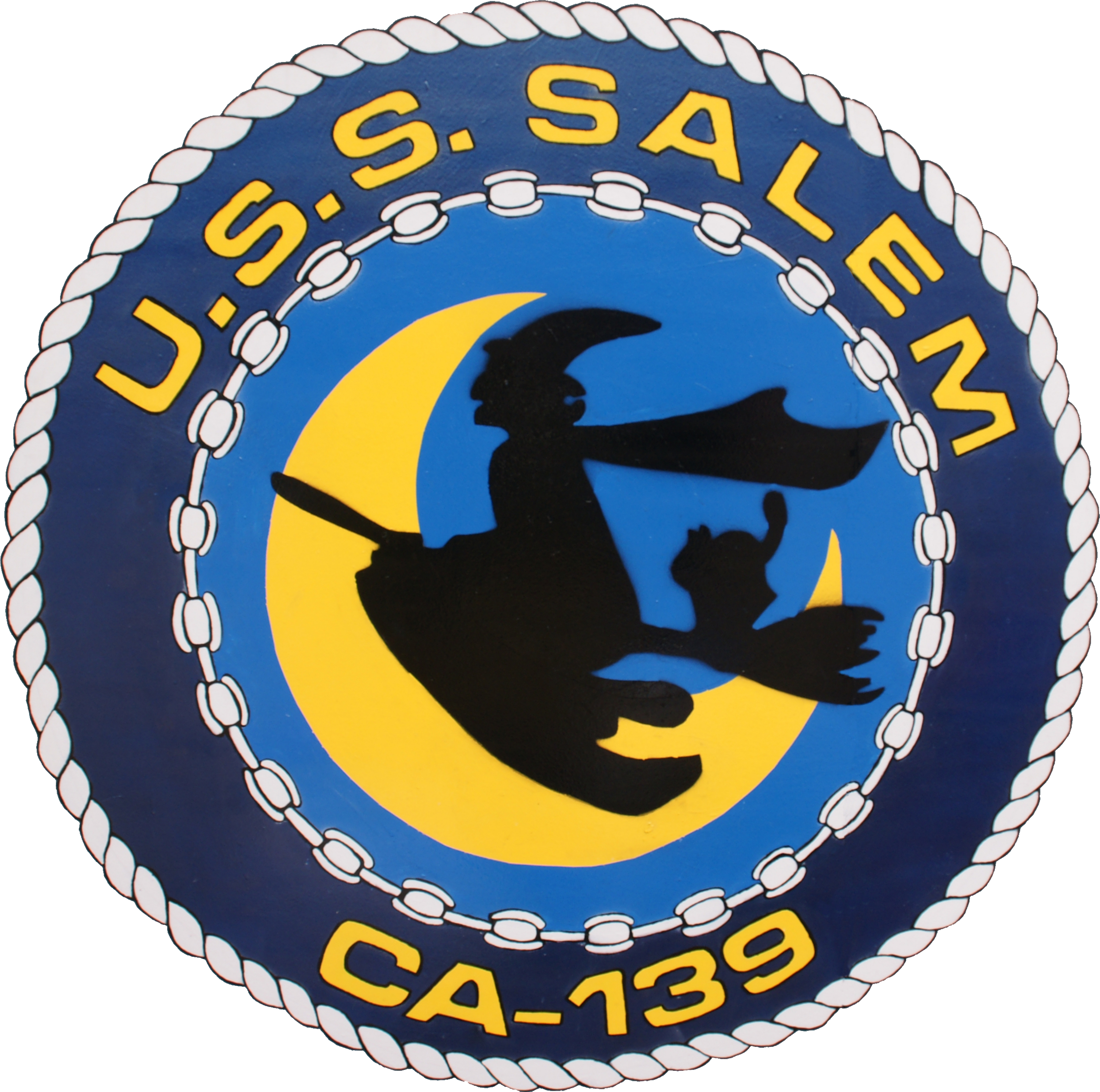
- Badge

General characteristics
- Class & type: Des Moines-class heavy cruiser
- Displacement: 17,000 long tons (17,273 t) (standard); 21,500 long tons (21,845 t) (full load)
- Length: 700 ft (210 m) wl; 716 ft 6 in (218.39 m) oa
- Beam: 76 ft 6 in (23.32 m)
- Draft: 22 ft (6.7 m)
- Propulsion: 4 shafts; General Electric turbines; 4 boilers; 120,000 shp (89,000 kW)
- Speed: 33 kn (61 km/h)
- Range: 10,500 nmi at 15 knots; 19,400 km at 28 km/h
- Boats & landing craft carried: 2–4 × lifeboats
- Complement: 1,799 officers and enlisted
- Sensors & processing systems: AN/SPS-6 air-search radar; AN/SPS-8A height-finding radar; AN/URN-3 TACAN; AN/URD-4 radio direction finder
- Armament: 3 × triple 8"/55 caliber guns; 6 × twin 5"/38 caliber guns; 12 × twin 3"/50 caliber guns; 12 × single Oerlikon 20 mm cannons
- Armor: Belt: 4–6 in (102-152 mm); Deck: 3.5 in (89 mm); Turrets: 2–8 in (51-203 mm); Barbettes: 6.3 in (160 mm); Conning tower: 6.5 in (165 mm)
- Aviation facilities: 2 × aircraft catapults; Helipad (later conversion)

USS Salem (CA-139) is a Des Moines-class heavy cruiser completed for the United States Navy shortly after World War II and commissioned in 1949. The second ship of her class, she was the world's last heavy cruiser to enter service and is the last remaining. She was decommissioned in 1959 after serving in the Atlantic and Mediterranean. She is open to the public as a museum ship in Quincy, Massachusetts.

== Construction ==
Salem was laid down on 4 July 1945 by the Bethlehem Steel Co.'s Fore River Shipyard, Quincy, Massachusetts; launched on 25 March 1947, sponsored by Miss Mary G. Coffey and commissioned on 14 May 1949, with Captain John C. Daniel in command. Her main battery held the world's first automatic 8" guns and were the first 8" naval guns to use cased ammunition instead of shell and bag loading.

== Service career ==
After a visit to Salem, Massachusetts, on 4 July 1949, Salem underwent three months of shakedown at Guantanamo Bay, Cuba, between July and October 1949, followed by post-shakedown repairs at the Boston Navy Yard. She then made two cruises to Guantanamo in November and December 1949 and participated in maneuvers with the Atlantic Fleet in early 1950.

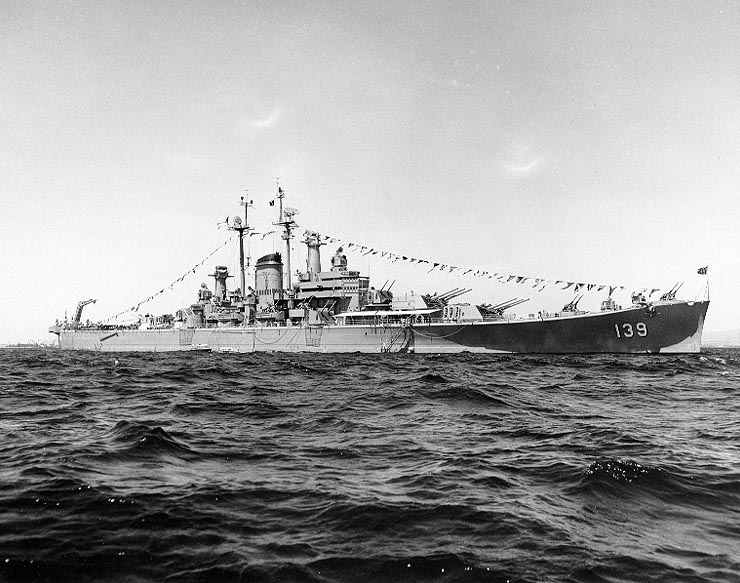
Salem at anchor off Sardinia on 19 May 1950

Salem departed the United States East Coast on 3 May 1950 and, on 17 May, relieved Newport News (CA-148) as flagship of the 6th Fleet in the Mediterranean. During this, the first of seven deployments to the Mediterranean as fleet flagship, Salem visited ports in Malta, Italy, France, Greece, Turkey, Lebanon, and Algeria, and participated in training exercises. On 22 September, she was relieved by Newport News and returned to the United States.

After three weeks at Boston, Salem joined the Atlantic Fleet for maneuvers and, on 3 January 1951, sailed for six weeks of intensive gunnery training at Guantanamo. She completed her training off Bermuda; and, on 20 March, sailed for the Mediterranean to relieve Newport News as 6th Fleet flagship. On 19 September, she was relieved by Des Moines (CA-134) and returned to the United States for four months of overhaul at Boston.

Salem sailed on 1 February 1952 for refresher training at Guantanamo and returned to Boston on 29 March for repairs. On 19 April, she sailed for her third Mediterranean deployment, relieving Newport News at Algiers on 28 April. Besides the normal port calls and exercises, Salem participated in Exercise "Beehive II," which involved units of the United States, British, Italian, French, and Greek navies. She was relieved once again by Des Moines on 29 September and arrived in Boston on 9 October.

After four months of local operations, Salem sailed for Guantanamo Bay on 24 January 1953 for training. Returning to Boston on 27 February, she sailed for the Mediterranean on 17 April and again relieved Newport News as flagship. Her fourth deployment was marked by Exercise "Weldfest" and by emergency relief work after the 1953 Ionian earthquake. Salem was the first American ship to arrive on the scene, and provided relief supplies and assistance from 13 August until her own stocks ran low four days later. Relieved by Des Moines as flagship on 9 October, she returned to Boston on 24 October and entered the shipyard for overhaul.

On 6 February 1954, Salem sailed again for Guantanamo Bay and returned on 7 April after refresher training. She left Boston on 30 April; and, on arrival in the Mediterranean on 12 May, again assumed duties as 6th Fleet flagship. Relieved by Des Moines at Lisbon on 22 September, she returned to Boston on 29 September. In October and November 1954, she participated in war games with the Atlantic Fleet.

Between 19 January and 22 February 1955, Salem made her annual cruise to Guantanamo Bay for training. After a two-week reserve training cruise, the cruiser sailed for the Mediterranean on 2 May and relieved Newport News on 19 May. During this, her sixth deployment, she participated in a NATO exercise and a Franco-American naval exercise, with Under Secretary of the Navy Thomas S. Gates embarked as an observer. Salem departed Barcelona on 23 September and returned to Boston on 2 October 1955 for a four-month overhaul.

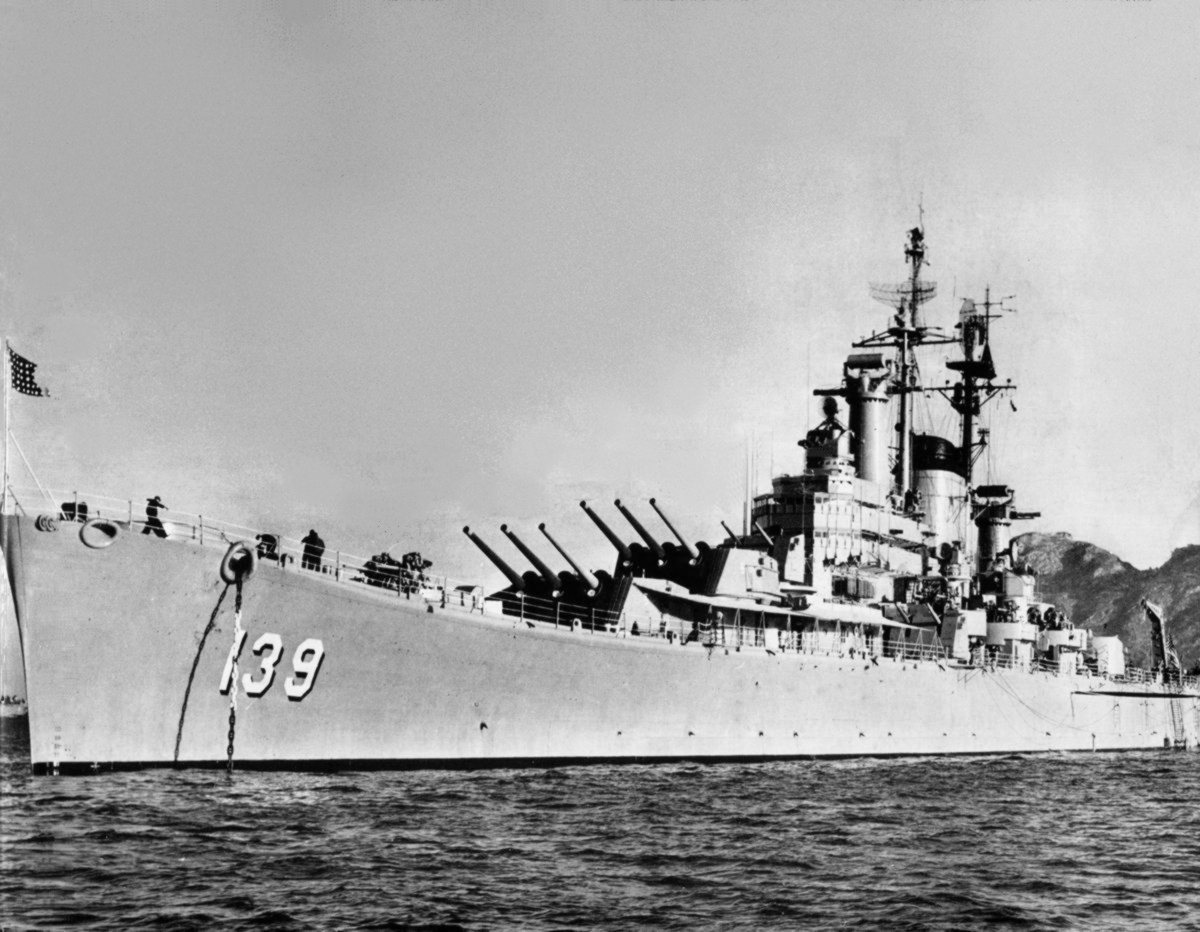
Salem in the Mediterranean c. 1957

The cruiser left Boston on 16 February 1956 for training at Guantanamo in preparation for a 20-month cruise as "permanent" flagship of the Commander, 6th Fleet with homeport at Villefranche-sur-Mer. She returned to Boston on 5 April and sailed for the Mediterranean on 1 May. While she was at sea, the Suez Crisis broke out; and she was diverted to Rhodes in the Eastern Mediterranean where she joined the fleet on 14 May and assumed her flagship duties. She remained in the eastern Mediterranean until mid-June and returned when fighting broke out on 30 October. In April and August 1957, the 6th Fleet, by its presence in the eastern Mediterranean, twice showed United States support for the government of Jordan threatened by subversion. The cruiser departed the Mediterranean on 26 June 1958 and arrived at Norfolk on 4 July.

Salem was used to portray the German pocket battleship Admiral Graf Spee in the 1956 film The Battle of the River Plate, although the original German ship had a single triple gun turret placed forward of the superstructure where the Salem has two triple gun turrets forward of its superstructure. Her original hull number of 139 is also clearly visible in several exterior shots. The plot of the film includes reference to the number explaining the true fact that the German navy often disguised raiders like the Admiral Graf Spee as neutral ships, the US being neutral at the time.

In 1958, the cruiser arrived in Monaco to celebrate the birth of Albert II, born to Rainier III, Prince of Monaco and Princess Grace Kelly.

Salem was scheduled for inactivation after her return from the Mediterranean, but the request of Lebanon on 15 August 1958 for aid against an anticipated coup led to a short reprieve. Salem had relieved Northampton on 11 August as flagship of Commander, 2nd Fleet and, on 2 September, departed Norfolk, visited Augusta Bay and Barcelona during a ten-day cruise in the Mediterranean, and returned to Norfolk on 30 September. She reported to the Norfolk Navy Yard on 7 October for inactivation, disembarked the Commander of the 2nd Fleet on 25 October and was decommissioned on 30 January 1959. She was stored as part of the Atlantic Reserve Fleet at the Philadelphia Naval Shipyard. The ship was surveyed in 1981 for possible reactivation as part of the 600 ship navy project, and while the inspection results showed she was in excellent condition, funding to reactivate Salem and her sister Des Moines was not secured from Congress.

=== Museum ship ===
In October 1994, Salem was returned to Quincy, Massachusetts, where she is now a museum ship as part of the United States Naval Shipbuilding Museum. Salem also houses the USS Newport News Museum, The US Navy Cruiser Sailors Association Museum, and the US Navy SEALs Exhibit room.

Salem was closed to tourists in September 2013 when the wharf to which she was moored became unstable. The wharf's former owner, the MBTA, forced the closure. Subsequently, the wharf was sold to private interests. Salem was opened on weekends in May 2015.

Scheduled since the wharf closure to be moved to a location in East Boston, the United States Naval Shipbuilding Museum signed a deal with the landowner in February 2016 to keep Salem at the Fore River Shipyard in Quincy until at least 2021 and was again opened for visits on weekends starting April 2016.

In August 2017 Salem was closed to the public while she was being relocated to a different pier in the shipyard. As of August 2019 she was opened to the public on weekends.

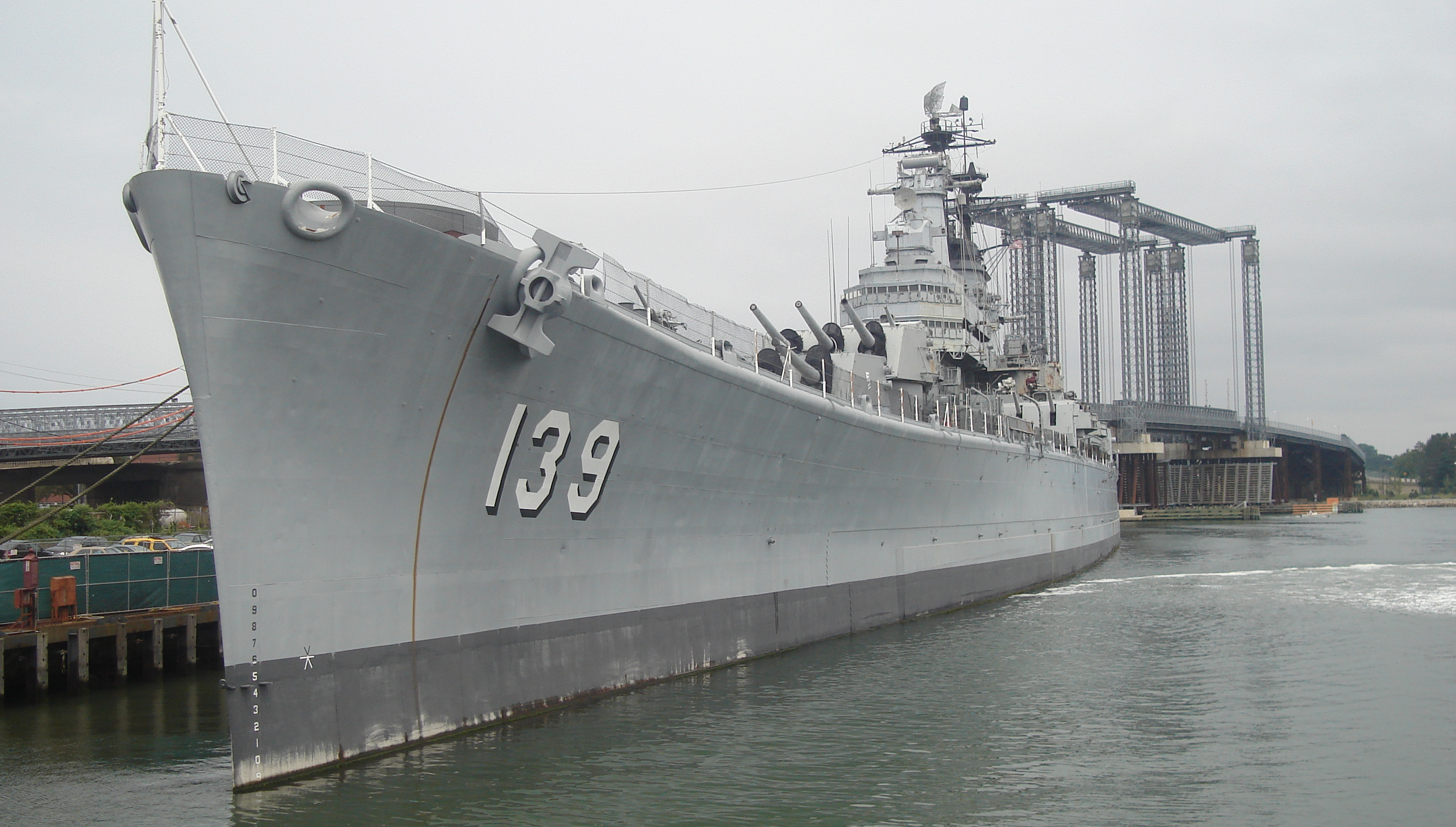
Salem at her former location in Quincy

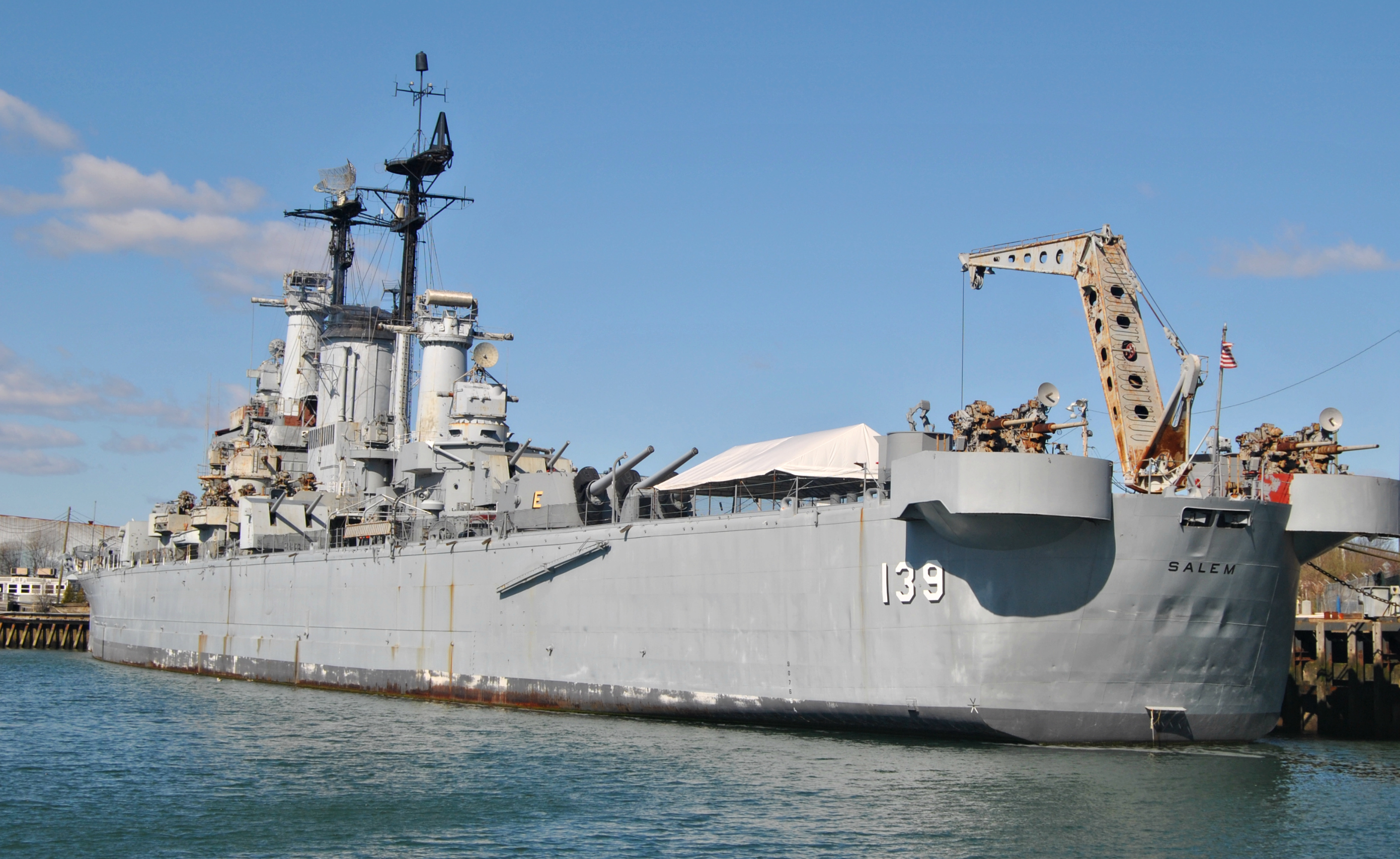
Aft view in her former berth

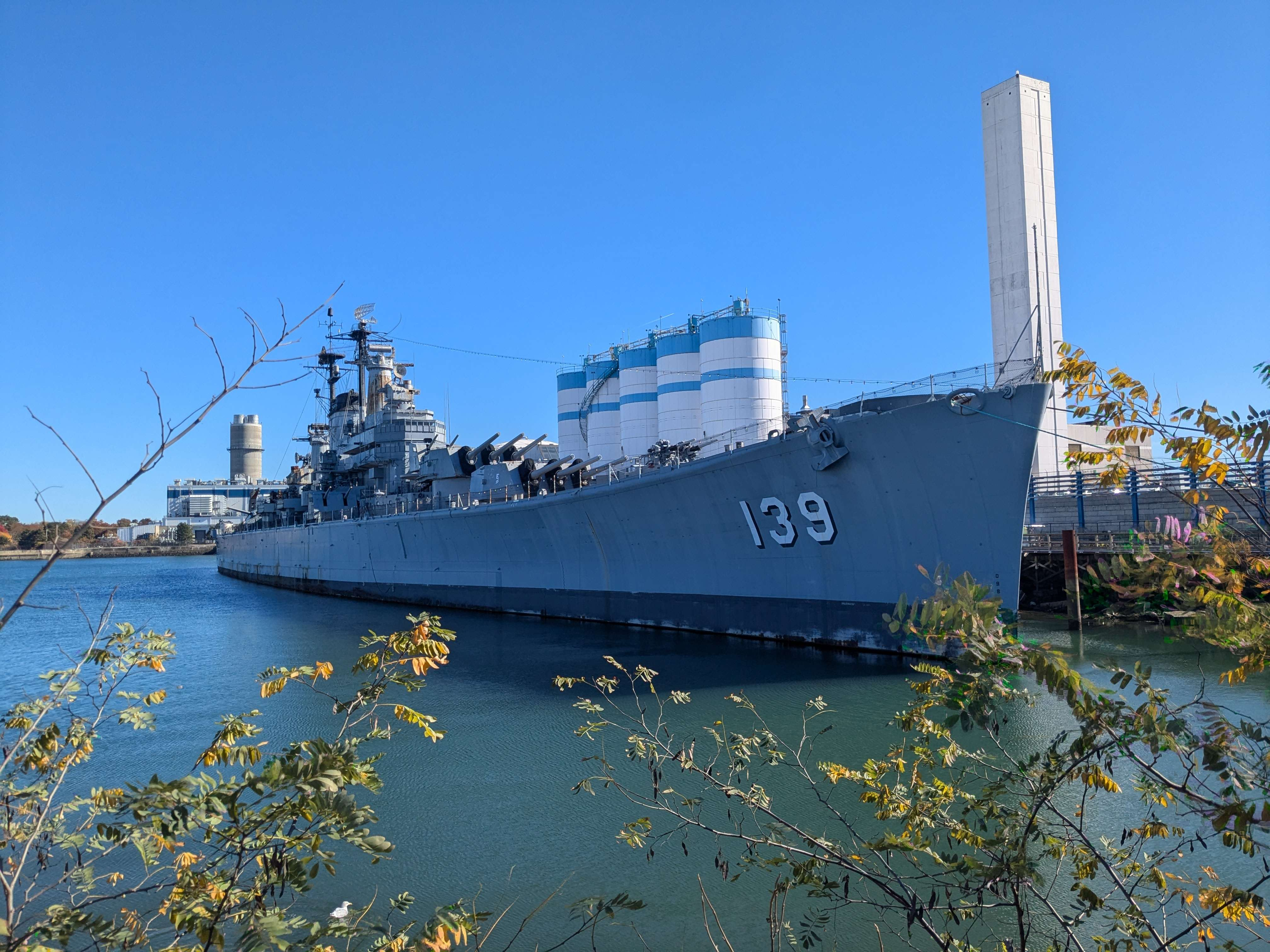
At her new berth

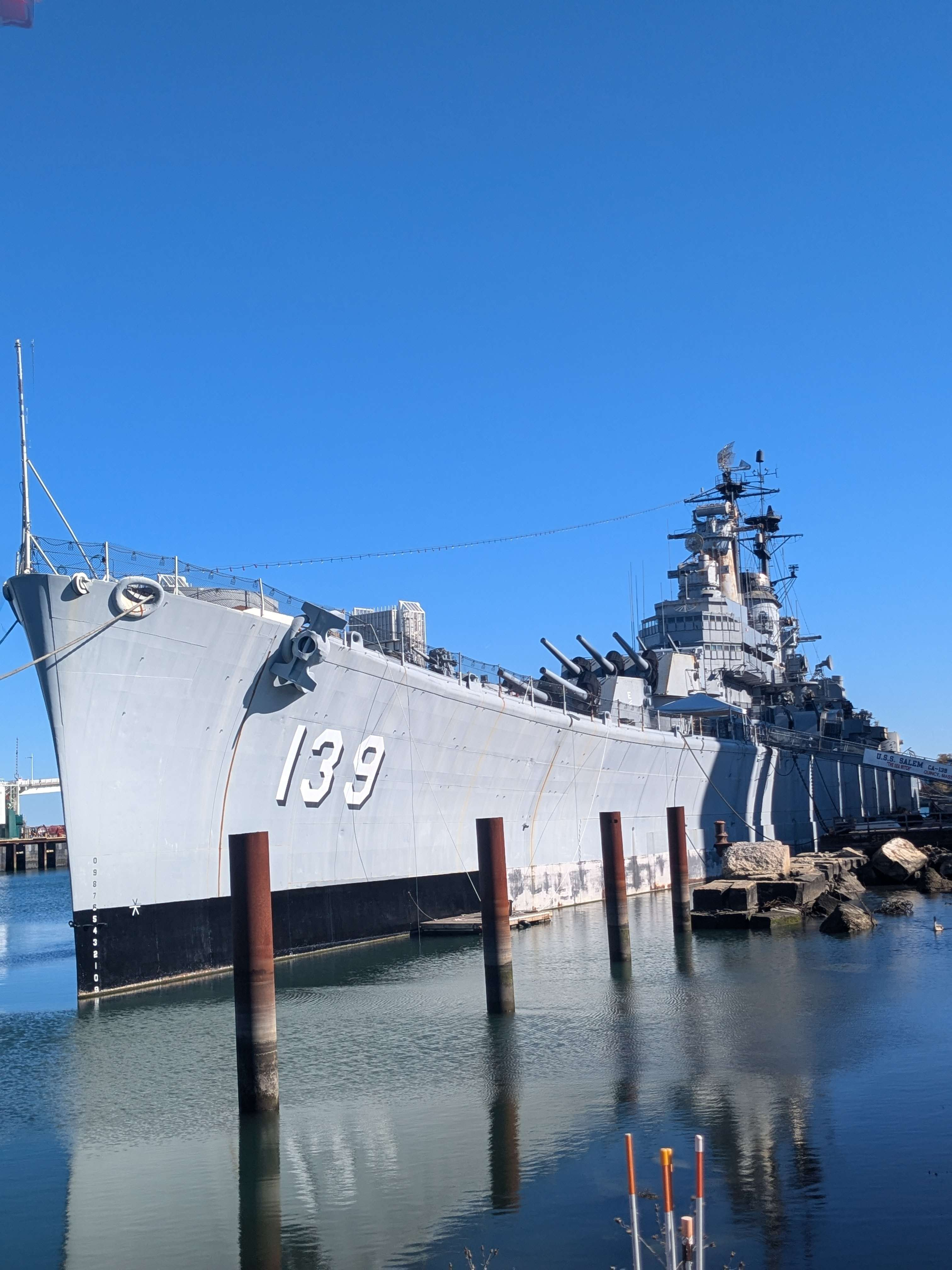
View from the museum's parking lot

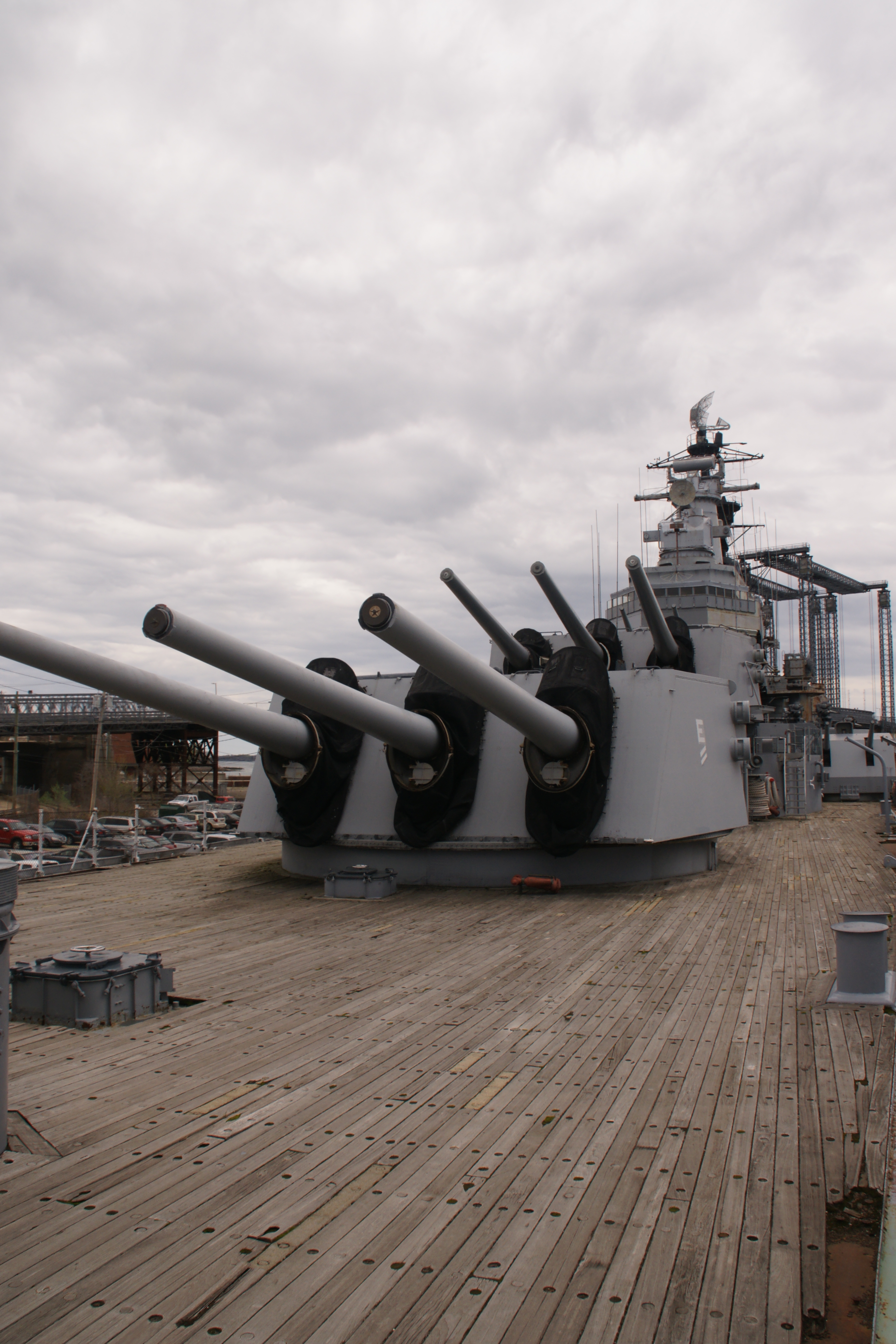
From port bow looking astern

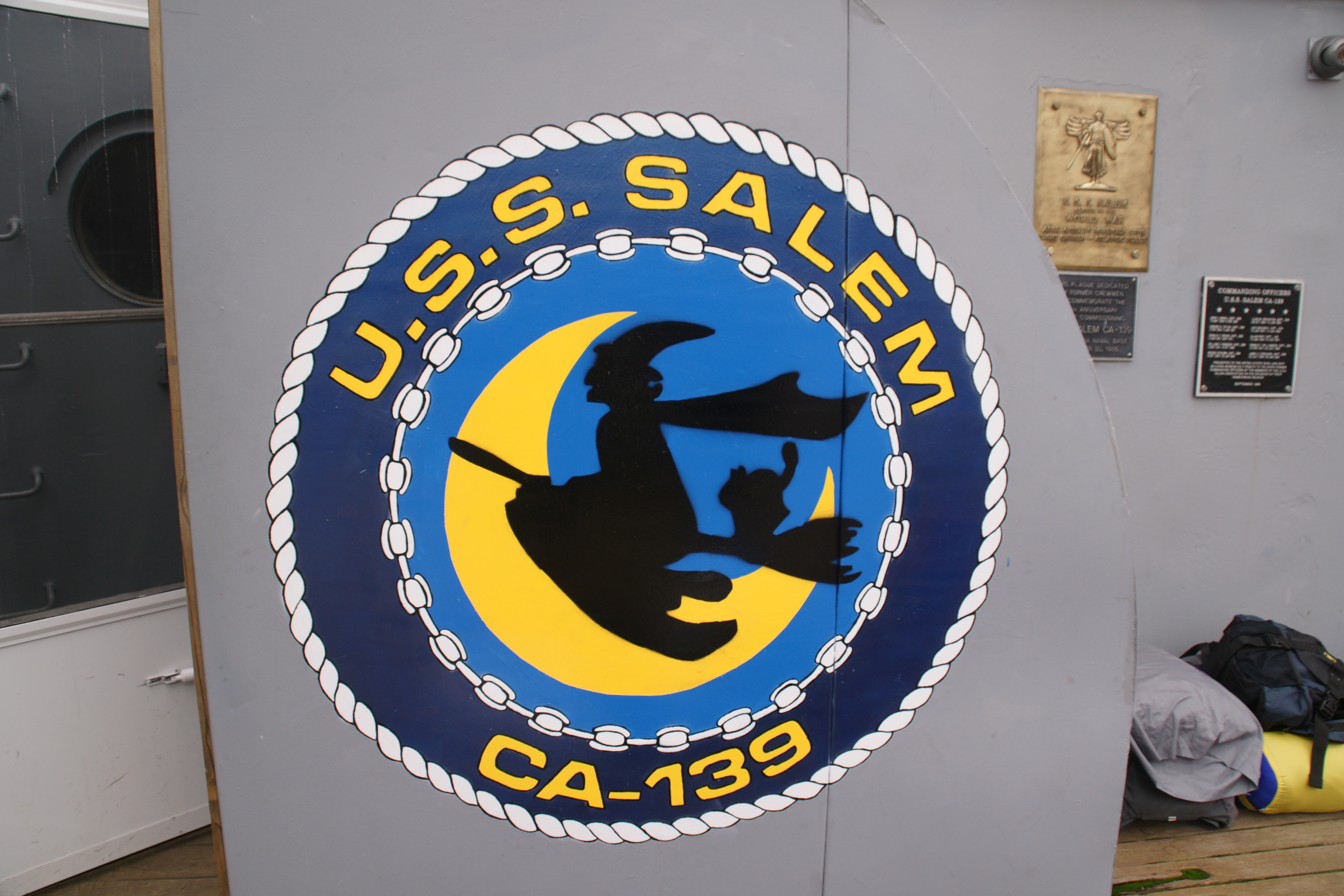
Ship's badge

== In the media ==
=== Film ===
USS Salem depicted the German heavy cruiser Admiral Graf Spee in the 1956 film The Battle of the River Plate. A floating model of Salem was built for filming combat scenes.

Salem was featured in the 2016 feature film The Finest Hours directed by Craig Gillespie. She served as the set of the tanker SS Pendleton which broke in two off of Cape Cod on 15 February 1952. Many machinery spaces and passageways were used for filming and can be spotted throughout the movie.

=== Television ===
The ship was featured on Ghost Hunters. In late 2016, USS Salem partnered with Ghost Ship Harbor, to create a haunted attraction on the deck of the ship. The event was a fundraiser for USS Salem and saw thousands of people visit the ship during the month of October to see the haunted houses that were built. In 2017 Fodor's ranked it the scariest haunted house in Massachusetts.

Salem was featured as a haunted location on the paranormal TV series Most Terrifying Places which aired on the Travel Channel in 2019. The show featured tour guides and visitors who claimed to see the ghost of a former sailor who was badly burned in an explosion while on board USS Cleveland. He was brought aboard the Salem when it was docked at the Brooklyn Navy Yard and was used to transport the men who were injured in the fire to the medical bay.
