= Age/sex/location =

Internet chat slang and abbreviation

Age/sex/location (commonly referred to by the shorthand A/S/L, asl or ASL) is an article of Internet slang used in instant messaging programs and in Internet chatrooms. It is used in shorthand as a question to quickly find out the age, sex, and general location of the person with whom someone is interacting. It is not widely used anymore and has mostly become an archaism.

== Description ==
A/S/L is often asked as a question in romantic and sexual contexts online, but it may be used also to just get some defining characteristics of a user. It was an internationally common introduction for virtual conversations in the early 2000s.

A/S/L was commonly used in chat rooms. A 2001 Pew report, "Teenage Life Online", said that teenagers listed A/S/L as the most common question asked of people entering chat rooms. A 2004 study found that "a/s/l" was used in various ways: as a question of everyone in chat rooms, targeted at specific people, or to pair off conversation partners by common identity markers. By 2004, A/S/L was the most common chat technique people used to describe their physicality in dating chat rooms. Among Indonesian students, who mostly chatted over city-specific Indonesian IRC channels in the early 2000s, "a/s/l" in its English-derived acronym was the standard initial greeting between people chatting one-on-one. Afterward, similar follow-up queries would be asked in Indonesian, starting with kul/ker to ask about classes and work.

When interacting with people in chat rooms on the early internet, people's age, sex, and location were not labeled, and could remain ambiguous and changeable, as with physical characteristics and identity expression. This undercut many traditional expectations for interaction. In-person interaction would usually be between people in the same location, thus making it known, and a 1989 paper found that the main labels people used to categorize each other were sex and age.

== Variations ==
- A/S/L/P or ASLP are short for "Age, Sex, Location, and Picture".
- NASL is short for "Name, Age, Sex, Location".
- ASLNP (or written as "A/S/L/N/P"): "Age/Sex/Location/Name/Picture".
- ASLR is short for "age, sex, location, race".
- ASLRP is short for "age, sex, location, race, picture".
- A/S is short for "Age/Sex".
- A/S/L/M/H is short for "Age, sex, location, music, hobbies".

== Criticism ==
The fact that users often seek A/S/L information in "initial interactions" implies an "emphasis on the physical body online". 52% of the MOO character descriptions referenced age, sex, location, or physical appearance.

Some chatroom participants characterized A/S/L questions as "creepy" or "socially inappropriate".

== Legacy ==
The title of the 2025 novel A/S/L by Jeanne Thornton references the age, sex, and location query of internet chatroom slang, as well as the names of the book's three protagonists. In the book, the characters grew up and met through the early internet. A/S/L addresses the nostalgia surrounding that culture while showing how it can influence and shape the physical world.
