= 8-inch/55-caliber gun =

8"/55 caliber naval gun
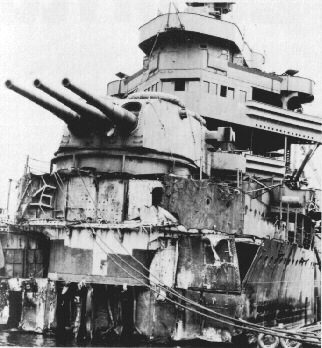
- No. 2 turret of USS New Orleans following a Japanese torpedo-initiated explosion of the forward magazine during the Battle of Tassafaronga on 30 November 1942.
- Type: Naval gun Coastal defence
- Place of origin: United States

Service history
- In service: 1925–1975
- Used by: United States
- Wars: World War II; Korean War; Vietnam War

Production history
- Variants: Mk 9, Mk 12, Mk 14, Mk 15, Mk 16

Specifications
- Barrel length: 440 inches (11 m) bore (55 caliber)
- Shell: 335 pounds (152 kg)A.P. 260 pounds (118 kg) H.E.
- Caliber: 8 inches (20 cm)
- Muzzle velocity: 2,500 feet per second (760 m/s)
- Maximum firing range: 30,050 yards (27,480 m)

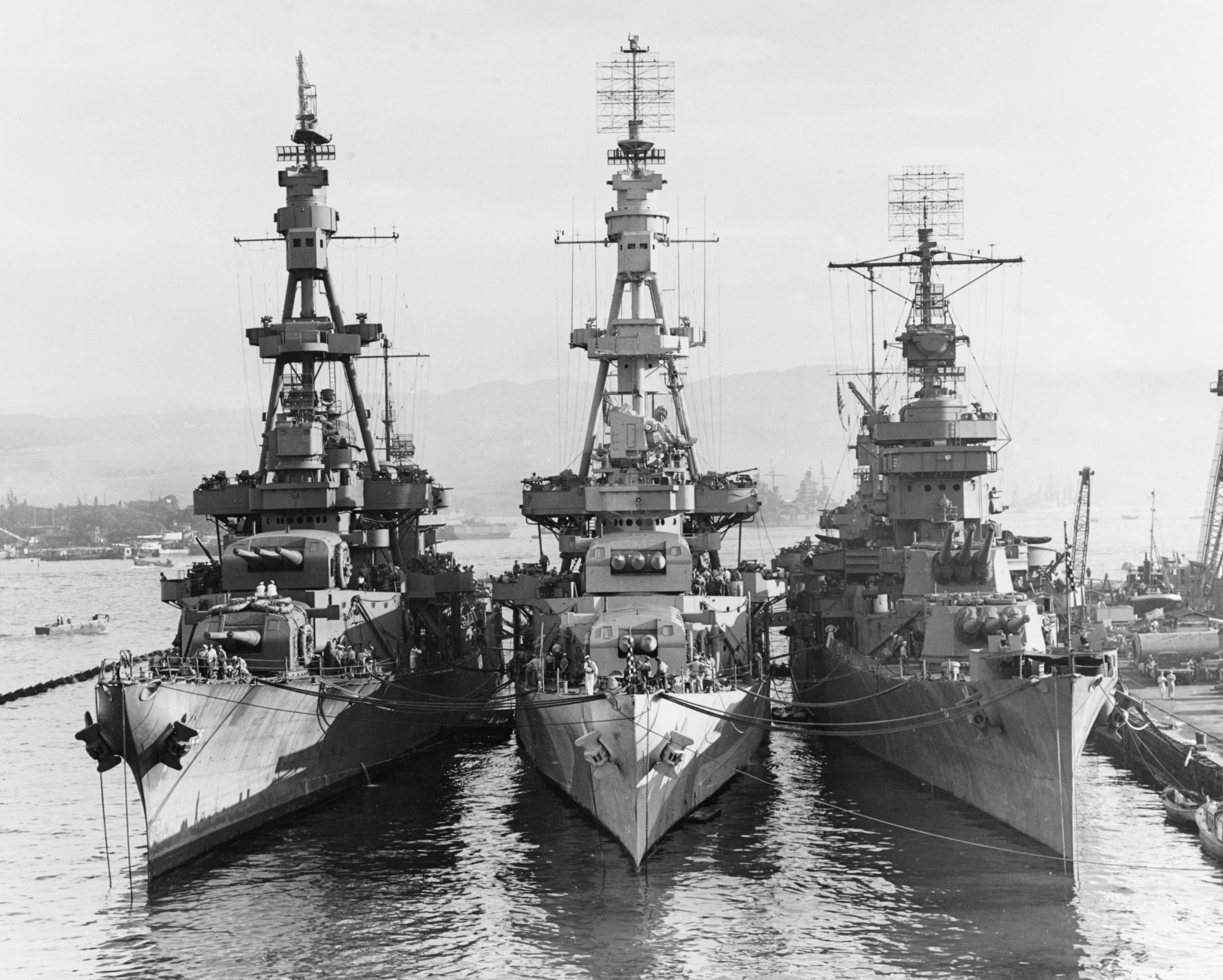
The rounded roofs of early Mark 9 twin and triple turrets of USS Salt Lake City and USS Pensacola with the later turrets of USS New Orleans on the right.

The 8"/55 caliber gun (spoken "eight-inch-fifty-five-caliber") formed the main battery of United States Navy heavy cruisers and two early aircraft carriers. United States naval gun terminology indicates the gun barrel had an internal diameter of 8 inches (203 mm), and the barrel was 55 calibers long (barrel length is 8 inch × 55 = 440 inches or 36.6 feet or 11 meters).

== Mark 9 ==
These built-up guns weighed about 30 tons including a liner, tube, jacket, and five hoops. A down-swing Welin breech block was closed by compressed air from the gas ejector system. Loading with two silk bags each containing 45 pounds (20 kg) of smokeless powder gave a 260-pound (120 kg) projectile a velocity of 2800 feet per second (853 m/s). Range was 18 miles 31,860 yd (29,130 m) at the maximum elevation of 41 degrees.

== Mark 12 ==
These simplified built-up guns eliminated hoops to reduce weight to 17 tons. The breech mechanism was similar and loading two silk bags each containing 43 pounds (20 kg) of smokeless powder gave a 335-pound (152 kg) projectile a velocity of 2500 feet per second (760 m/s). Each gun could fire about four rounds per minute. Maximum range was 30,050 yd (27,480 m) at the maximum elevation of 41 degrees.

== Mark 14 ==
These guns were similar to Mark 9, with the same shell weight and maximum range, with a smaller chamber and rifling twist increased from 1 in 35 to 1 in 25 in a chromium-plated bore.

== Mark 15 ==
These guns were similar to Mark 12, with the same shell weight and maximum range, with the smaller chamber of the Mark 14 gun. Useful life expectancy was 715 effective full charges (EFC) per liner.

== Mark 16 ==
These self-loading guns with lined monobloc construction and vertical sliding breech blocks weighed about 20 tons. Semi-fixed ammunition (projectile and powder case handled separately) with 78 pounds (35 kg) of smokeless powder gave a 335-pound (152 kg) projectile a velocity of 2500 feet per second (760 m/s). Each gun could fire about ten rounds per minute. Useful life expectancy was 780 Effective Full Charges per liner. Range was 17 miles (27 kilometers) at the maximum elevation of 41 degrees. This gun was modified for the experimental Major Caliber Lightweight Gun.

== Coast defense use ==
The eight twin turrets of Lexington and Saratoga were removed in early 1942 during refits at Pearl Harbor. The turrets were turned over to the United States Army Coast Artillery Corps and remounted as coastal artillery on Oahu. Four two-turret batteries were established at Salt Lake near Aliamanu Crater (Battery Salt Lake, later Battery Burgess), Wiliwilinui Ridge Military Reservation (Battery Wilridge, later Battery Kirkpatrick), Opaeula Military Reservation (Battery Opaeula, later Battery Riggs), and Brodie Camp Military Reservation (Battery Brodie, later Battery George Ricker). After the war, all of the guns and turrets were scrapped in 1948, along with almost all other US coast artillery.

One of USS Louisville's main battery 8 inch 55 caliber gun turrets (Turret No. 2) damaged in a kamikaze attack on January 5, 1945, was removed and taken to the Nevada Test Site and converted into a rotating radiation detector, to collect data on nuclear tests.

== Ships mounting 8"/55 caliber guns ==
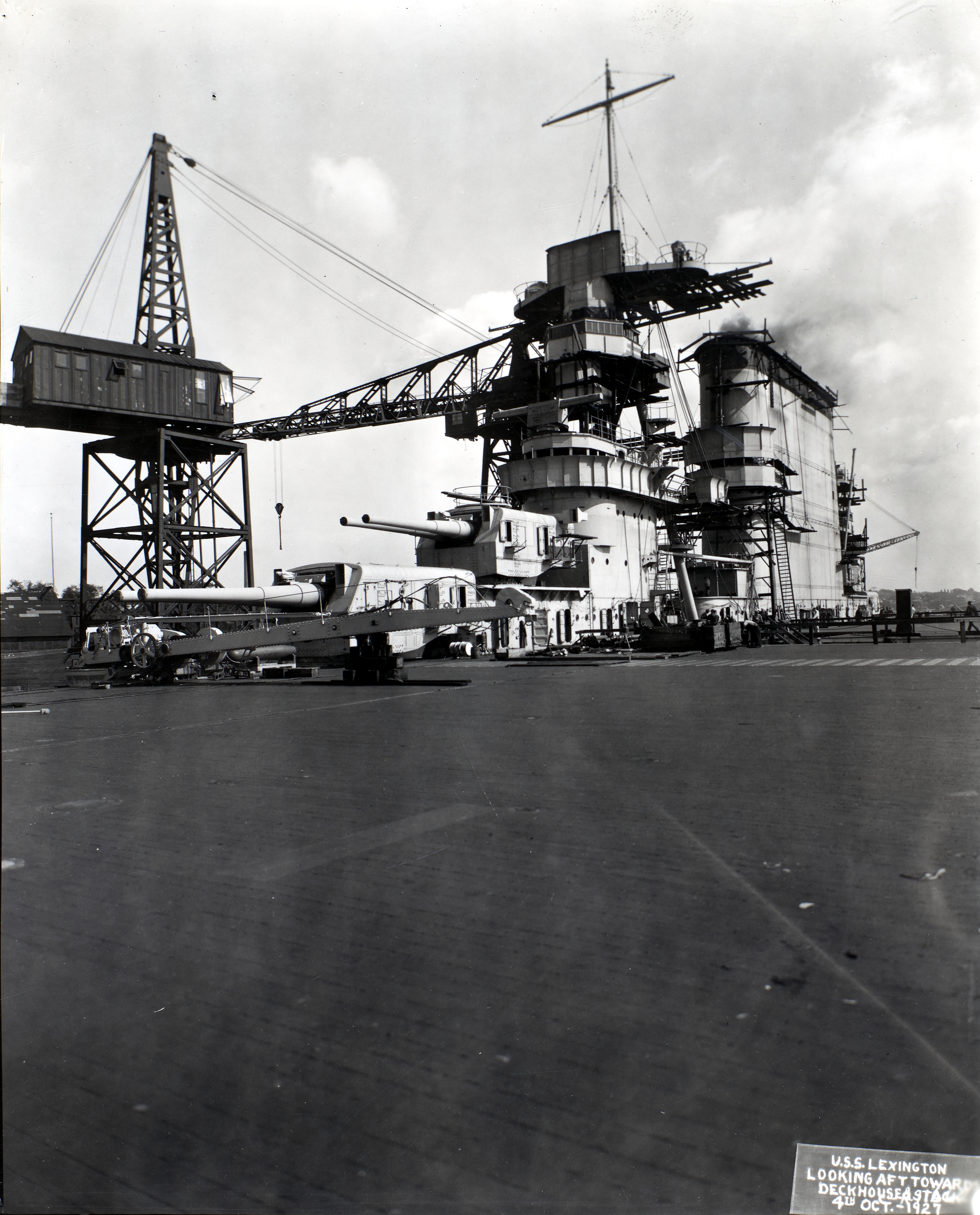
8"/55 caliber Mark 9 guns on USS Lexington

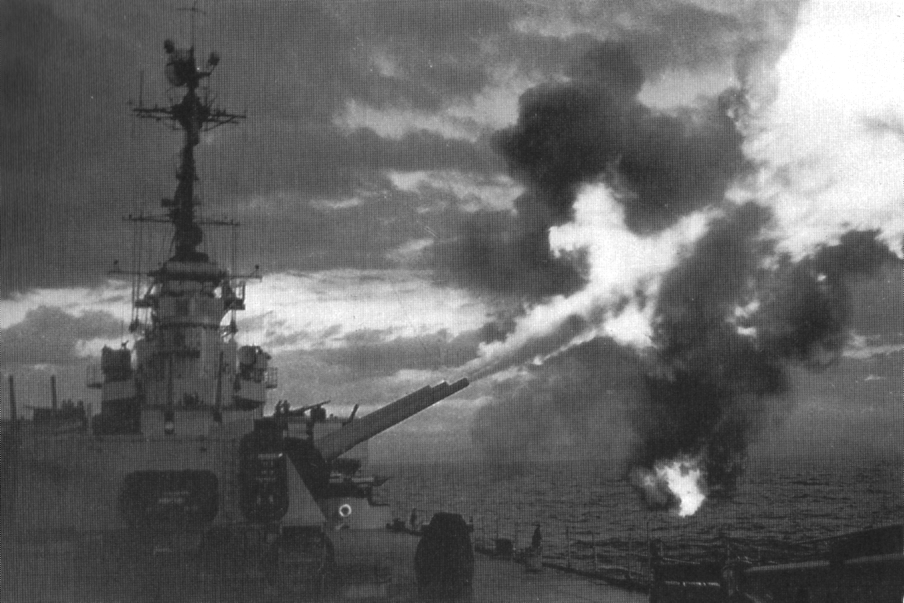
The heavy cruiser USS Helena fires her 8"/55 caliber Mark 15 guns at enemy forces ashore on the Korean Peninsula in August 1950 during the Korean War.

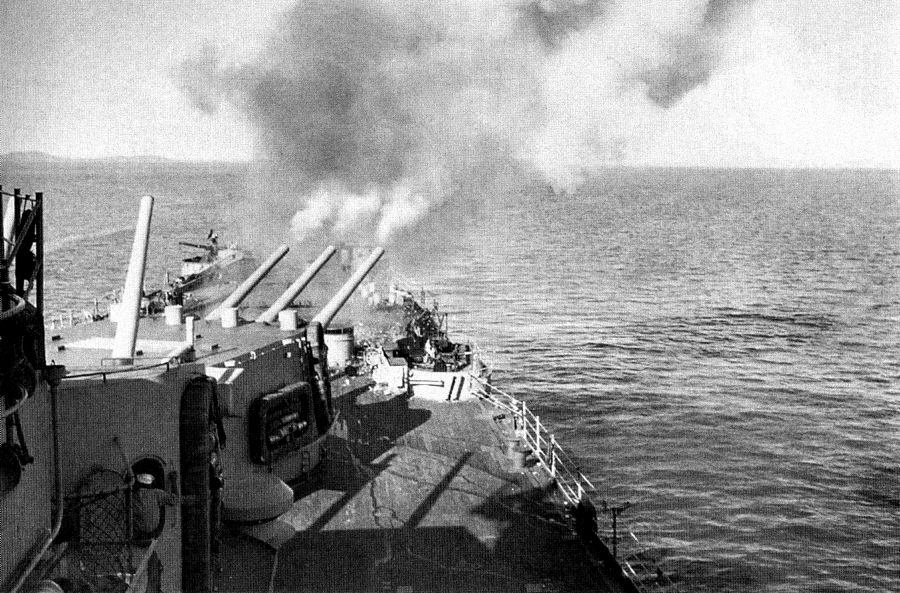
The after turret of the heavy cruiser USS Toledo fires its 8"/55 caliber Mark 15 guns at enemy targets ashore around Incheon, South Korea, on 13 or 14 September 1950 during the bombardment preceding the invasion of Incheon during the Korean War.

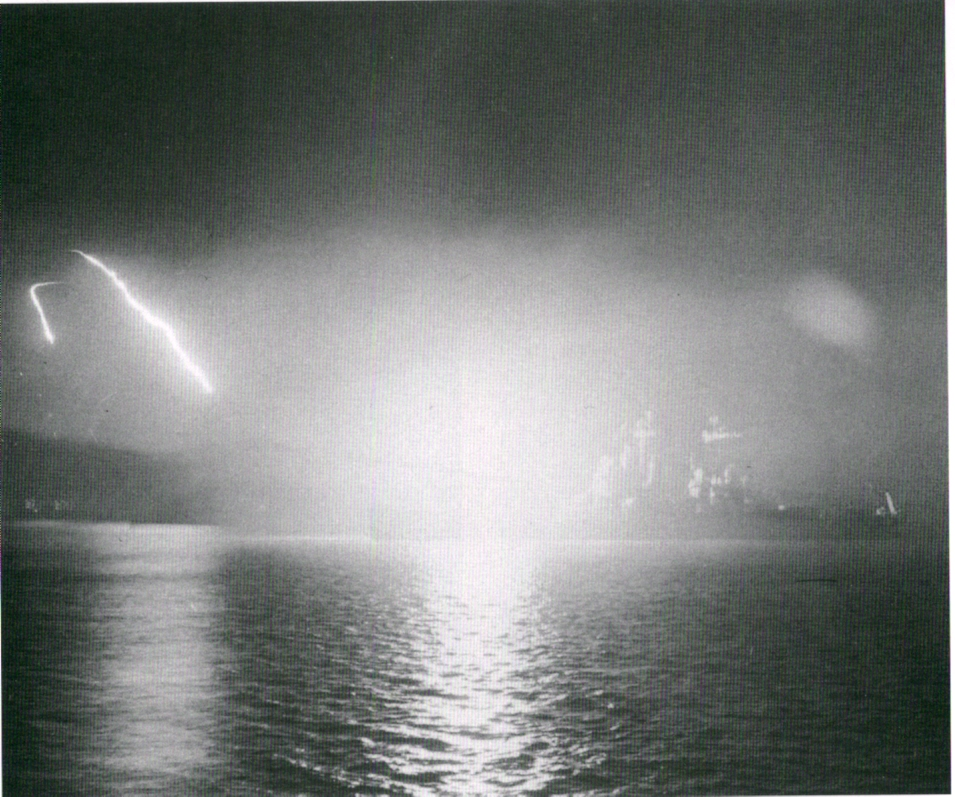
The heavy cruiser USS Saint Paul fires her 8"/55 caliber Mark 15 guns at Chinese troops threatening the evacuation of United Nations troops from Hungnam, North Korea, in December 1950 during the Korean War.

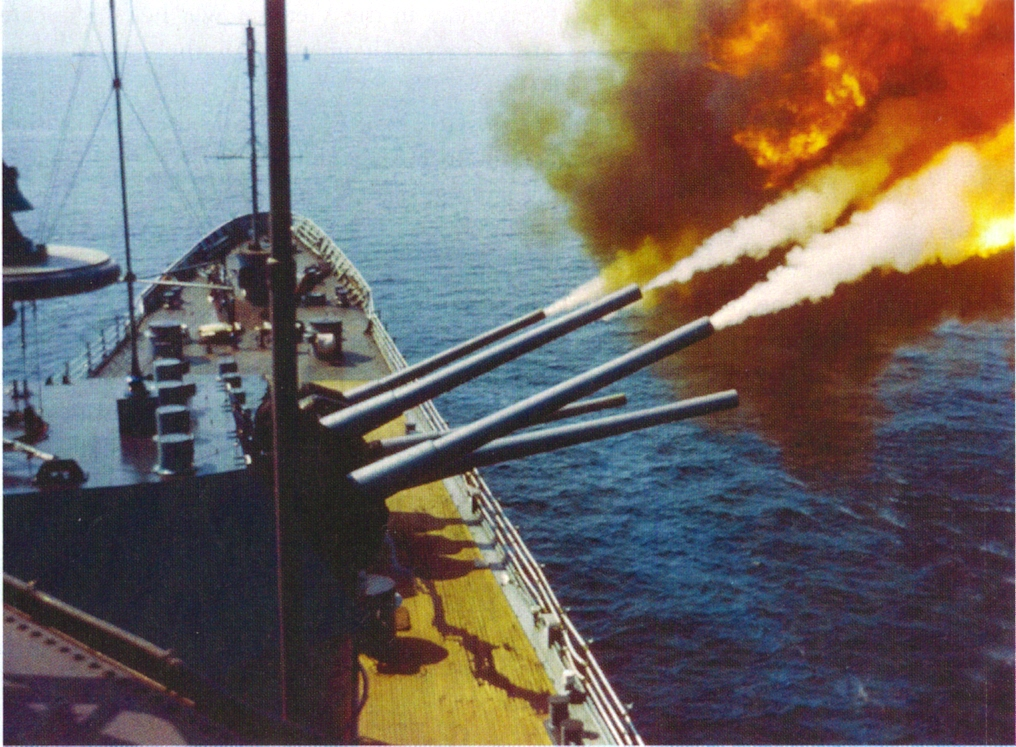
The heavy cruiser USS Saint Paul's forward 8"/55-caliber guns fire at enemy targets ashore in North Vietnam in October 1966 during the Vietnam War.

- 2 Lexington-class (c. 1921 – 1925) aircraft carriers:
  - Lexington, Saratoga
    - Mk 9 guns in four 190-ton twin turrets
    - removed in 1942 and added to Oahu coast defenses
- 2 Pensacola-class (c. 1927) heavy cruisers:
  - Pensacola, Salt Lake City
    - Mk 9 (later Mk 14) guns in two 190-ton twin turrets and two 250-ton triple turrets
- 6 Northampton-class (c. 1928) heavy cruisers:
  - 2 of 6: Chicago, Houston
    - Mk 9 guns in three 250-ton triple turrets
    - Houston was sunk in March 1942, Chicago was sunk in January 1943
  - 4 of 6: Northampton, Chester, Louisville, Augusta
    - Mk 9 (later Mk 14) guns in three 250-ton triple turrets
    - Northampton was sunk in November 1942
- 2 Portland-class (c. 1930) heavy cruisers:
  - Portland, Indianapolis
    - Mk 9 (later Mk 14) guns in three 250-ton triple turrets
    - Indianapolis was sunk in July 1945
- 7 New Orleans-class (c. 1931) heavy cruisers:
  - 3 of 7: 294 ton triple turrets
    - Astoria: Mk 9 guns (sunk in 08/1942)
    - New Orleans: Mk 9 (later Mk 14) guns
    - Minneapolis: Mk 9 (later Mk 15) guns
    - Astoria was sunk in August of 1942
  - 4 of 7: Tuscaloosa, San Francisco, Quincy, Vincennes
    - Mk 12 guns in three 250-ton triple turrets
    - Quincy and Vincennes were sunk in August 1942
- Wichita
  - Mk 12 guns in three 314-ton triple turrets
- 14 Baltimore-class (c. 1941) heavy cruisers:
  - 1 of 14: Baltimore
    - Mk 12 guns in three 300-ton triple turrets
  - 13 of 14: Boston, Canberra, Quincy, Pittsburgh, Saint Paul, Columbus, Helena, Bremerton, Fall River, Macon, Toledo, Los Angeles, Chicago
    - Mk 15 guns in three 300-ton triple turrets
- 3 Oregon City-class (c. 1944) heavy cruisers:
  - Oregon City, Albany, Rochester
    - Mk 15 guns in three 300-ton triple turrets
- 3 Des Moines-class (c. 1945) heavy cruisers:
  - Des Moines, Salem, Newport News
    - Mk 16 guns in three 450-ton triple turrets
- 1 ex-Forrest Sherman-class: USS Hull (DD-945)
  - Mk 16 gun in one 86-ton single automatic mount 8"/55 caliber Mark 71 gun installation

Ship	Gun Installation
USS Lexington (CV-2)	Mk 9 guns in four 190-ton twin turrets
USS Saratoga (CV-3)	Mk 9 guns in four 190-ton twin turrets
USS Pensacola (CA-24)	Mk 9 (later Mk 14) guns in two 190-ton twin turrets and two 250-ton triple turrets
USS Salt Lake City (CA-25)	Mk 9 (later Mk 14) guns in two 190-ton twin turrets and two 250-ton triple turrets
USS Northampton (CA-26)	Mk 9 (later Mk 14) guns in three 250-ton triple turrets
USS Chester (CA-27)	Mk 9 (later Mk 14) guns in three 250-ton triple turrets
USS Louisville (CA-28)	Mk 9 (later Mk 14) guns in three 250-ton triple turrets
USS Chicago (CA-29)	Mk 9 guns in three 250-ton triple turrets
USS Houston (CA-30)	Mk 9 guns in three 250-ton triple turrets
USS Augusta (CA-31)	Mk 9 (later Mk 14) guns in three 250-ton triple turrets
USS New Orleans (CA-32)	Mk 9 (later Mk 14) guns in three 294-ton triple turrets
USS Portland (CA-33)	Mk 9 (later Mk 14) guns in three 250-ton triple turrets
USS Astoria (CA-34)	Mk 9 guns in three 294-ton triple turrets
USS Indianapolis (CA-35)	Mk 9 (later Mk 14) guns in three 250-ton triple turrets
USS Minneapolis (CA-36)	Mk 9 (later Mk 15) guns in three 294-ton triple turrets
USS Tuscaloosa (CA-37)	Mk 12 guns in three 250-ton triple turrets
USS San Francisco (CA-38)	Mk 12 guns in three 250-ton triple turrets
USS Quincy (CA-39)	Mk 12 guns in three 250-ton triple turrets
USS Vincennes (CA-44)	Mk 12 guns in three 250-ton triple turrets
USS Wichita (CA-45)	Mk 12 guns in three 314-ton triple turrets
USS Baltimore (CA-68)	Mk 12 guns in three 300-ton triple turrets
USS Boston (CA-69) CAG-1	Mk 15 guns in three 300-ton triple turrets
USS Canberra (CA-70) CAG-2	Mk 15 guns in three 300-ton triple turrets
USS Quincy (CA-71)	Mk 15 guns in three 300-ton triple turrets
USS Pittsburgh (CA-72)	Mk 15 guns in three 300-ton triple turrets
USS Saint Paul (CA-73)	Mk 15 guns in three 300-ton triple turrets
USS Columbus (CA-74)	Mk 15 guns in three 300-ton triple turrets
USS Helena (CA-75)	Mk 15 guns in three 300-ton triple turrets
USS Oregon City (CA-122)	Mk 15 guns in three 300-ton triple turrets
USS Albany (CA-123)	Mk 15 guns in three 300-ton triple turrets
USS Rochester (CA-124)	Mk 15 guns in three 300-ton triple turrets
USS Bremerton (CA-130)	Mk 15 guns in three 300-ton triple turrets
USS Fall River (CA-131)	Mk 15 guns in three 300-ton triple turrets
USS Macon (CA-132)	Mk 15 guns in three 300-ton triple turrets
USS Toledo (CA-133)	Mk 15 guns in three 300-ton triple turrets
USS Des Moines (CA-134)	Mk 16 guns in three 450-ton triple turrets
USS Los Angeles (CA-135)	Mk 15 guns in three 300-ton triple turrets
USS Chicago (CA-136)	Mk 15 guns in three 300-ton triple turrets
USS Salem (CA-139)	Mk 16 guns in three 450-ton triple turrets
USS Newport News (CA-148)	Mk 16 guns in three 450-ton triple turrets
USS Hull (DD-945)	Mk 16 gun in one 86-ton single automatic mount (8"/55 caliber Mark 71 gun installation)

== See also ==
- 8"/55 caliber Mark 71 gun 1970s US experimental program

=== Weapons of comparable role, performance and era ===
- 203mm/50 Modèle 1924 gun French equivalent
- 20.3 cm SK C/34 Naval gun German equivalent
- 203 mm /53 Italian naval gun Italian equivalent
- 20 cm/50 3rd Year Type naval gun Japanese equivalent
- BL 8 inch Mk VIII naval gun UK equivalent

== Bibliography ==
- Campbell, John (1985). Naval Weapons of World War Two. Naval Institute Press. ISBN 0-87021-459-4.
- Fairfield, A.P. (1921). Naval Ordnance. The Lord Baltimore Press.
- Lewis, E. R. & Kirchner, D. P. (1992). "The Oahu Turrets". Warship International. XXIX (3): 273–301. ISSN 0043-0374.
- Martin, Ty (2016). "Question 3/52: USN 8-in/55 Mk-15 Rate of Fire". Warship International. LIII (1): 23. ISSN 0043-0374.
- "Mystery in the Desert Is a Mystery No More".
