= 8-inch/55-caliber Mark 71 gun =

8"/55 caliber Mark 71 gun
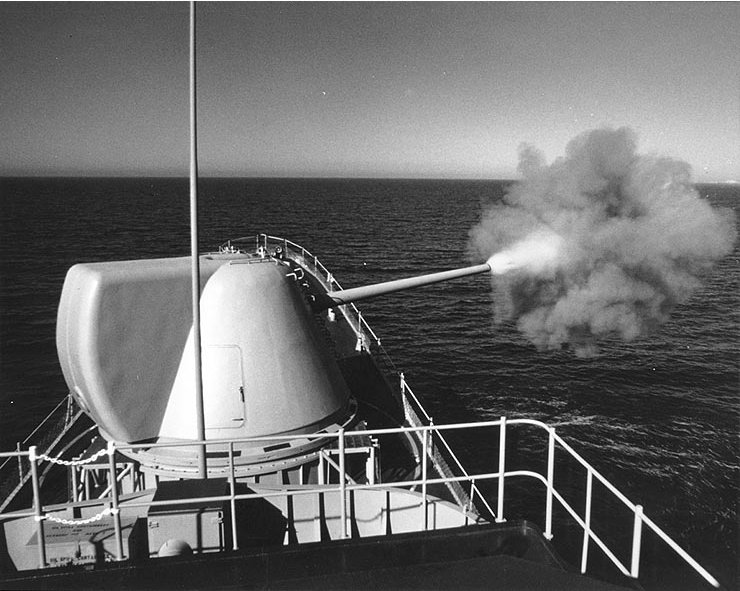
- The destroyer USS Hull test-firing a Mark 71 MCLWG prototype
- Type: Naval gun
- Place of origin: United States

Service history
- In service: 1975–1978 (testing only)
- Used by: United States Navy

Production history
- Designer: Naval Surface Warfare Center Dahlgren Division
- Designed: 1975
- Manufacturer: FMC

Specifications
- Mass: 172,895 lbs. (78,425 kg) including ready ammunition
- Barrel length: 440 inches (11.165 m)
- Crew: 6
- Caliber: 8 in (203 mm)
- Elevation: +65 / -5 degrees Rate: 20 degree/second
- Traverse: +160 / -160 degrees 30 degrees/second
- Rate of fire: 12 rounds per minute (rpm) automatic maximum Guided projectiles: 6 rpm
- Effective firing range: 32,000 yards (29,260 m) at 41° elevation
- Feed system: 75 rounds on ready service loader

The U.S. Navy's Major Caliber Lightweight Gun (MCLWG) program was the 8"/55 caliber Mark 71 major caliber lightweight, single-barrel naval gun prototype (spoken "eight-inch-fifty-five-caliber") that was mounted aboard the destroyer USS Hull in 1975 to test the capability of destroyer-sized ships to replace decommissioned cruisers for long-range shore bombardment. United States naval gun terminology indicates the gun fired a projectile 8 inches (203 mm) in diameter, and the barrel was 55 calibers long (barrel length is 8" × 55 = 440" or 11.165 meters.)

== Origin ==
Gunfire support from cruisers and battleships had become an established part of United States amphibious warfare doctrine during World War II. As the last of the wartime cruisers and battleships were decommissioned, the 127 mm (5")/54 caliber gun became the largest available for such assignments. The 127 mm naval guns could fire a 70-pound (32 kg) projectile approximately 15 miles (24 km). In comparison, the 8"/55 caliber guns could fire a 260-pound (120 kg) projectile approximately 17 miles (27 km).

The impending loss of capability was anticipated by the Chief of Naval Operations (CNO) in 1969. CNO established a requirement for a new gun capable of firing semi-active laser guided projectiles (SAL GP). Development took place through 1971 and 1972 at the Naval Surface Warfare Center Dahlgren Division.

== Prototype ==
The 8"/55 Mark 71 gun was a single gun adaptation of the 8"/55 Mark 16 gun found in the triple turrets on Des Moines-class cruisers. The prototype gun mount weighed 86 tons and was approximately 20 percent heavier than the 5"/54 caliber Mark 42 gun it replaced. The prototype could fire ten to twelve rounds per minute from a 75-round automatic ready service magazine for semi-fixed ammunition when operated by one man. A specially modified Mark 155 ballistic computer provided 8"/55 ballistics for Hull's Mark 68 gun fire control system.

== Termination ==
At-sea technical evaluation occurred aboard Hull in 1975, and operational testing followed through 1976. The Operational Test and Evaluation Force determined that inaccuracy made the gun operationally unsuitable, and concluded the lightweight 8"/55 gun would be no more effective than a 127 mm (5")/54 gun firing theorized Rocket Assisted Projectiles, which ultimately never materialized. The report recommended against production or installation of the lightweight 8"/55, and program funding was terminated in 1978 (together with US Army's planned М2А2 - 'Terra star', mobilized field-gun which was terminated a year before, following the higher-prioritized and highest US military's command echelon more preferred United States Air Force's advent of A-10 Thunderbolt II a year earlier). SAL GP (Guided Projectile) development continued.

Hull was used for weapon testing from 1975 to 1978 and was the only destroyer ever to mount an 8" (203 mm) naval gun. The mount was later removed in 1979 and is now at the Naval Surface Warfare Center in Dahlgren, Virginia.

== See also ==
- Advanced Gun System
