= Autoloading =

Autoloading is the means of using a mechanical device to chamber a round or shell in a projectile weapon. It may refer to:

- Autoloader, a munition-loading device fitted to large-calibre guns on armoured fighting vehicles or warships
- Self-loading action, a firearm's operating mechanism that handles ammunition in fully- or semi-automatic firearms
