= USS Rochester (CA-124) =

United States Navy warship

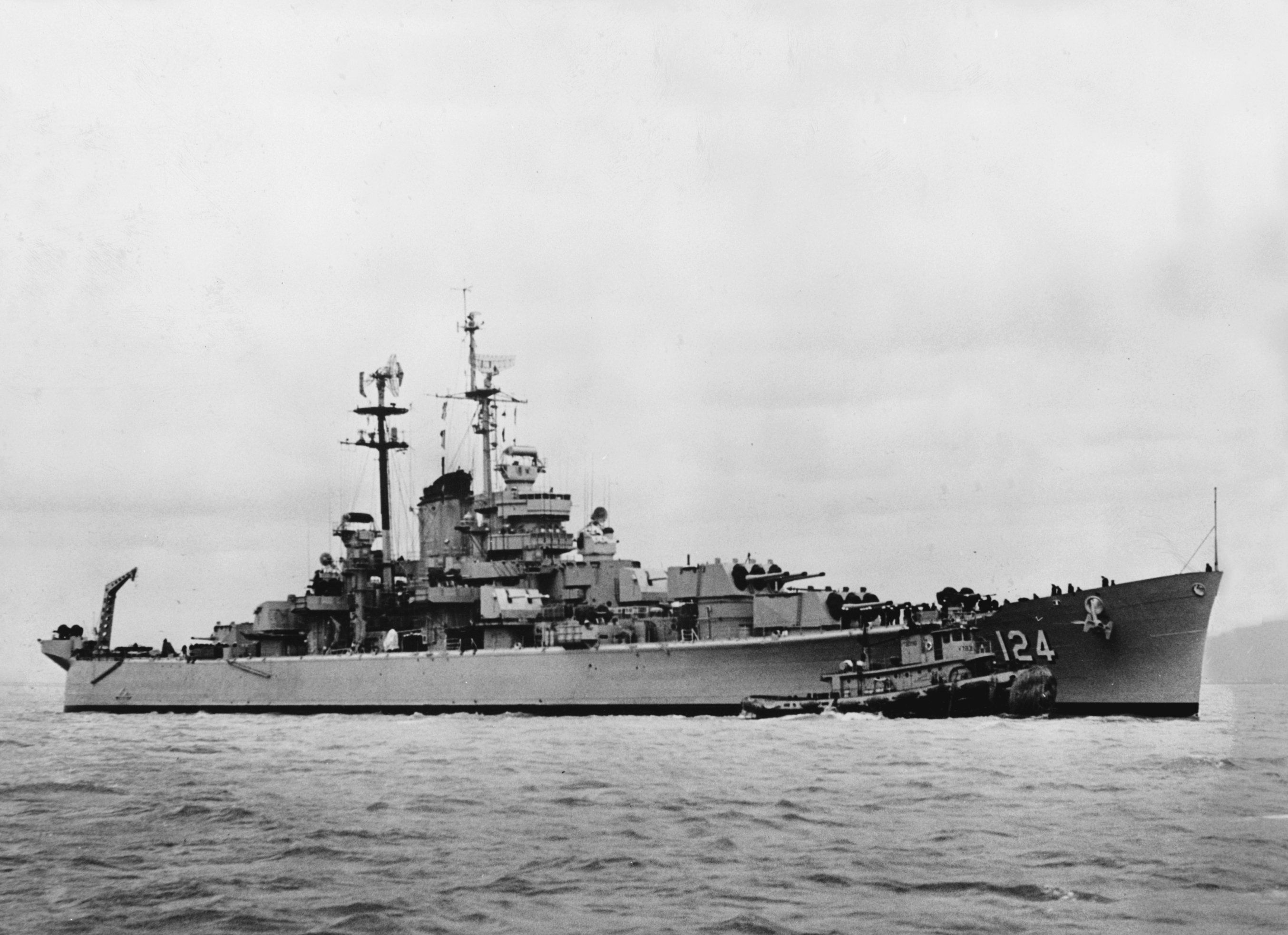
- USS Rochester in February 1956

History

United States
- Name: Rochester
- Namesake: Rochester, New York
- Builder: Bethlehem Steel Corporation
- Laid down: 29 May 1944
- Launched: 28 August 1945
- Sponsored by: Mrs. M. Herbert Eisenhart
- Commissioned: 20 December 1946
- Decommissioned: 15 August 1961
- Stricken: 1 October 1973
- Identification: Callsign: NTEZ; Hull number: CA-124
- Honours and awards: See Awards
- Fate: Scrapped, 24 September 1974
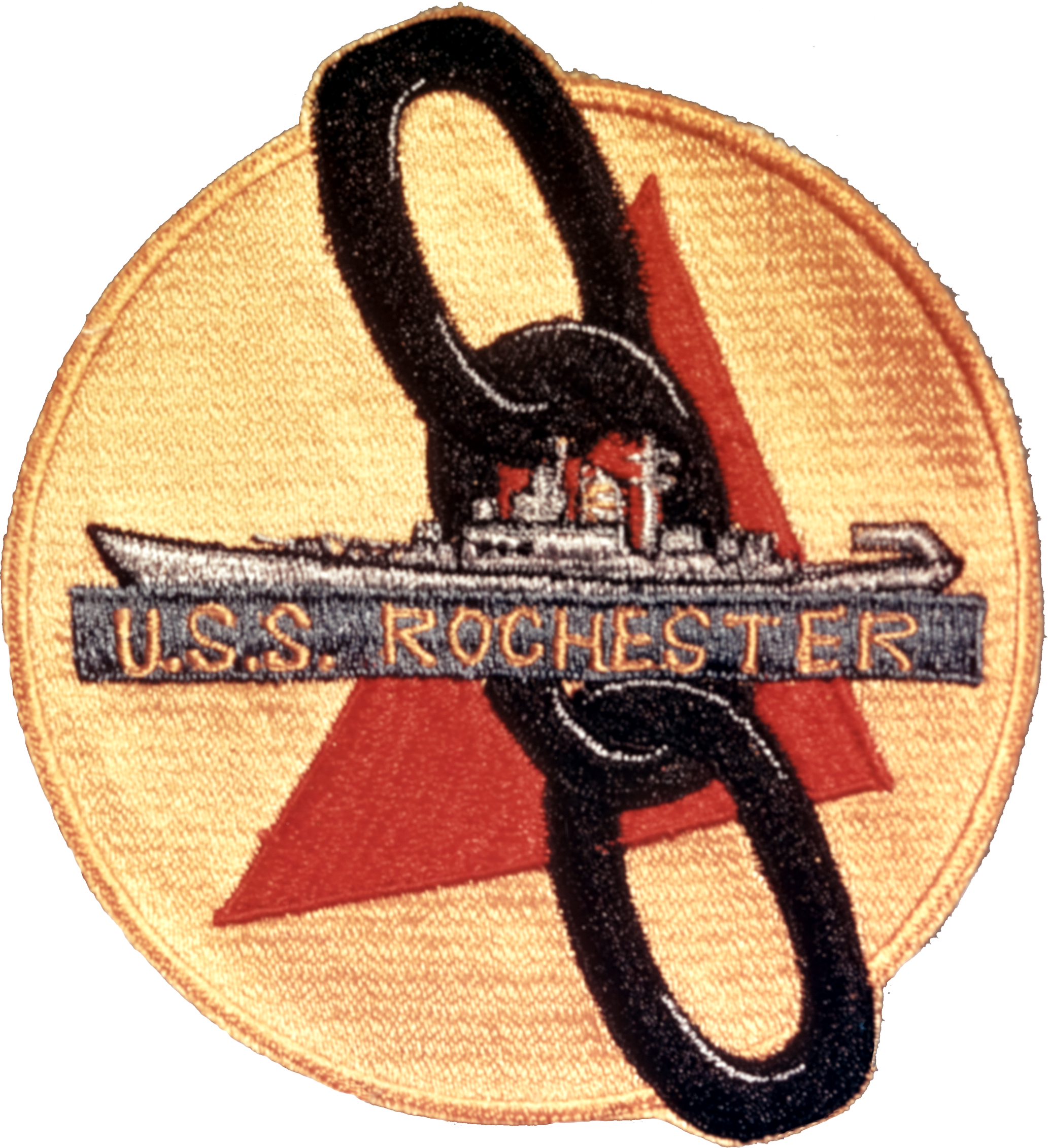
- Badge

General characteristics
- Class & type: Oregon City-class heavy cruiser
- Displacement: 13,700 tons
- Length: 674 ft 11 in (205.71 m)
- Beam: 70 ft 10 in (21.59 m)
- Draft: 20 ft 7 in (6.27 m)
- Speed: 33 kn (61 km/h)
- Complement: 1,142 officers and enlisted
- Armament: 9 × 8-inch/55-caliber guns; 12 × 5-inch/38-caliber guns; 48 × 40 mm guns; 20 × 20 mm guns
- Aircraft carried: 4

The USS Rochester (CA-124) was an Oregon City-class class heavy cruiser. The third ship of that name, she was laid down 29 May 1944 by Bethlehem Steel Co., at Quincy, Massachusetts; launched 28 August 1945; sponsored by Mrs. M. Herbert Eisenhart, wife of the president of Bausch & Lomb Optical Co., of Rochester, New York; and commissioned 20 December 1946 at the Boston Navy Yard.

Rochester departed Provincetown, Massachusetts, 22 February 1947 for shakedown out of Guantánamo Bay, Cuba. By the end of April, she was at Philadelphia, ready to commence nine extended naval reserve training cruises which took her north to Casco Bay in the Gulf of Maine and south to the Caribbean.

== 1940s ==
Upon completion of her ninth reserve training cruise in the second week of January 1948, Rochester prepared for Mediterranean service. Departing Philadelphia 20 February, she arrived at Gibraltar 1 March, and became flagship for Admiral Forrest Sherman, Commander, 6th Fleet. In addition to calling at several ports, the cruiser waited out the events of the Palestinian crisis, at Suda Bay on the northern coast of Crete. She completed her tour 14 June; Admiral Sherman shifted his flag to light cruiser Fargo (CL-106), and Rochester departed for Philadelphia the 15th, arriving 27 June. Rochester then resumed reserve training duty, making cruises to Bermuda, to New Brunswick, and to Jamaica.

After shore bombardment exercises at Bloodsworth Island in early October 1948, Rochester reported to the South Boston Naval Shipyard for her first overhaul which included removal of her catapults and conversion of her aviation section from seaplanes to helicopters. Her new aviation detachment consisted of four Sikorsky HO3S-1 utility helicopters.

She then operated in the Caribbean and along the North Atlantic coast until she stood out from Narragansett Bay on 5 January 1950 and steamed for the west coast, and a new homeport, Long Beach, California.

== Transfer to Pacific ==
In April 1950, Rochester departed Long Beach for the South Pacific. After calling at Pearl Harbor, she embarked Adm. Arthur W. Radford, Commander-in Chief, Pacific Fleet, for a tour of the U.S. Trust Territories. Upon completion of this tour, Vice Admiral A. D. Struble, Commander, 7th Fleet, was received on board at Guam. Rochester then set course for the Philippine Islands.

== Korean War Service ==
She was at Sangley Point, Philippine Islands, when president Truman ordered the 7th Fleet into action, and was operating with Carrier Task Force 77 on the morning of 3 July 1950 when the first U.N. air raids against North Korean forces were launched. On 18 and 19 July 1950, Rochester supported landings on Pohang Dong by the Army's 1st Cavalry Division. She continued to serve with Task Force 77 until 25 August 1950.

Vice Admiral Struble's flagship, commanded by Capt. Edward L. Woodyard, Rochester's guns provided support for the troops that landed at Inchon on 13 September in the operation that prompted General MacArthur's proud signal that "the Navy and Marines have never shone more brightly than this morning."

Just before daylight at 0550 on 17 September, a North Korean Yak-9 and an II-2 made an attack run on the cruiser Rochester, anchored off Wolmi-do. Initially the aircraft were thought to be friendly until they dropped four bombs over the American ship. All but one missed and the one that did hit smashed the Rochester's crane and failed to detonate. There were no American casualties in the skirmish and they painted a Purple Heart on the crane as a reminder of how close the ship came to being heavily damaged. After the bombing of the Rochester, she and the nearby cruiser HMS Jamaica opened fire with naval guns. The North Korean II-2 then strafed the British cruiser, resulting in one sailor killed and two wounded. At about the same time, shots from the Jamaica hit the II-2 and it crashed into the water. It became the first and only shootdown of an attacking plane with naval gunfire in the Korean War. The Yak-9 fled after losing its partner.

During the months of October, November, and December, Rochester operated continuously along the Korean coast for 81 days, providing gunfire support to troops ashore and serving as a mobile helicopter base. Helos were kept aloft constantly to aid the minesweepers in opening the ports of Changjon, Koje, Wonsan, Hungnam, and Songjin. In addition to destroying six mines by her own gunfire, the cruiser controlled naval air operations in the Wonsan area during the 10 days preceding the arrival of landing forces. Her helicopters also aided in the rescue of survivors from the minesweepers Pirate (AM-275) and Pledge (AM-277), sunk in Wonsan Harbor.

During 198 days of operations against the Communist forces in Korea, she steamed over 25,000 miles and expended 3,265 eight-inch and 2,339 five-inch projectiles. Rochester then called at Sasebo, Japan, and on 10 January 1951 headed for home, arriving at Long Beach 30 January. Ten days later she steamed for her scheduled yard overhaul at Mare Island Naval Shipyard, San Francisco, which took her through May.

During refresher training in the Long Beach-San Diego area, Rochester assisted in training crews for the ships that were being taken out of mothballs. She departed Long Beach 27 August 1951 for training in the Hawaiian area, after which she steamed for Yokosuka, Japan, arriving there 21 November. On 28 November, she blasted Kosong with more than 250 rounds of high explosive.

She then ranged the entire northeastern Korean coastline, bombarding ground targets, while her helicopters flew rescue missions for Task Force 77 aviators. Into the spring she continued harassment and interdiction missions along the eastern coast of Korea.

In early April 1952, she spent a week as flagship of the Blockading and Escorting Forces on Korea's west coast, and in late April, she steamed for her homeport. May through October was given over to in-port time at Long Beach and to coastal training operations. In November, the cruiser departed for another WestPac tour, arriving back on station as a unit of Task Group 77.1 (Support Group) in the waters off eastern Korea 7 December.

After spending the winter months in harassment and interdiction missions and other operations with the fast carrier task force, Rochester steamed home, arriving Long Beach, 6 April 1953.

== Post-Korean War and fate ==
During her regularly scheduled yard period at Mare Island, 4 May to 7 September 1953, her 20 mm. and 40 mm. batteries were replaced with 3 inch/50 rapid-fire guns. Coastal refresher training was followed by a 5 January 1954 departure for Western Pacific (WestPac). The normal exercises and port calls of a WestPac deployment ended with her departure from Yokosuka 29 May for the west coast.

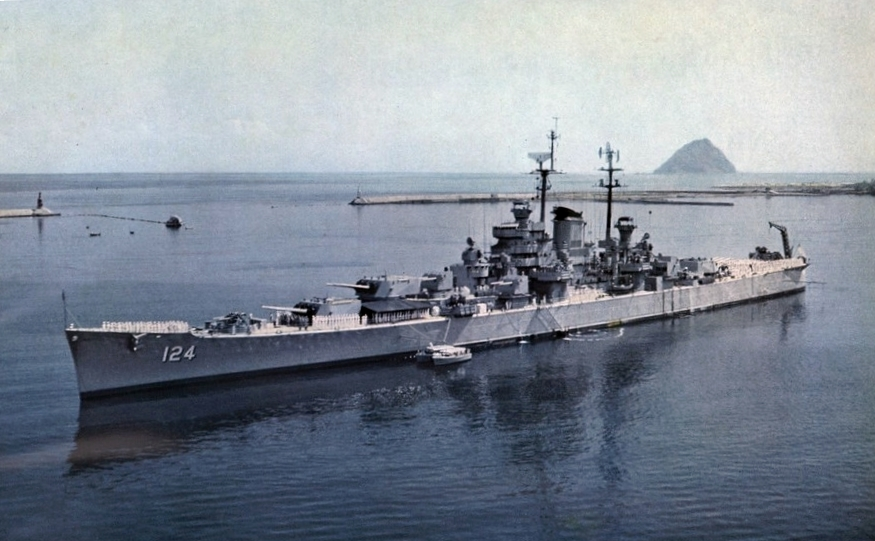
USS Rochester in 1956.

In February 1955, Rochester served on her fifth WestPac deployment, completing that cruise 6 August and arriving at her homeport the 22d. An overhaul at the San Francisco Naval Shipyard commenced 19 November 1955 and was completed 7 March 1956. Thence came refresher training and preparations for yet another WestPac deployment. This sixth Pacific tour commenced 29 May when Rochester and her escorts stood out of Long Beach. It was 16 December when the ships returned to homeport.

The first week of June 1957 found Rochester in San Francisco, where she acted as flagship for Fleet Adm. Chester W. Nimitz as he reviewed the 1st Fleet. Returning to Long Beach the 18th, she resumed local operations and exercises until her departure on 3 September for her seventh WestPac deployment. She returned to Long Beach 24 March 1958. Two more WestPac deployments followed, 6 January to 17 June 1959 and 5 April to 29 October 1960.

While planning was in place to convert her into the Albany class guided missile cruiser CG-13, funds were not appropriated and Rochester was ordered to report to the Commander, Bremerton Group, Pacific Reserve Fleet on 15 April 1961 for inactivation. She departed Long Beach 12 April, reported to the Puget Sound Naval Shipyard, and she was placed out of commission, in reserve, 15 August 1961. She remained at Bremerton until struck from the Navy list on 1 October 1973 and sold to Zidell Explorations, Portland, Oregon on 31 July 1974 and scrapped.

== Awards ==
- Combat Action Ribbon
- World War II Victory Medal
- Navy Occupation Service Medal with "Europe" clasp
- National Defense Service Medal (second)
- Korean Service Medal with 6 campaign stars
- Republic of Korea Presidential Unit Citation
- Korean War Service Medal
- United Nations Service Medal

== Gallery ==
USS Rochester Lifecycle

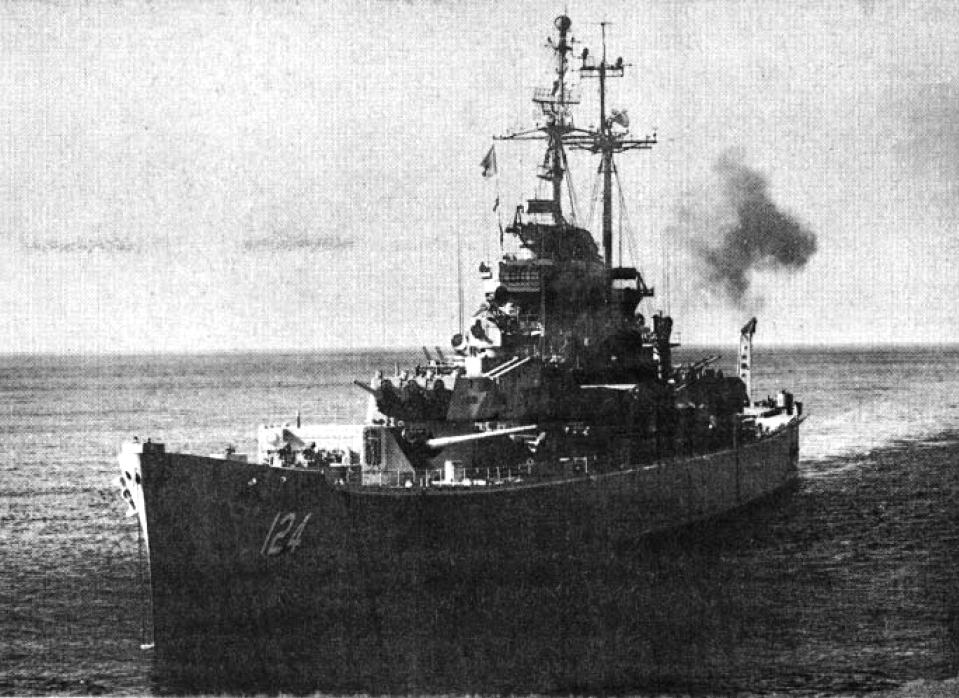
USS Rochester off Korea 1951.

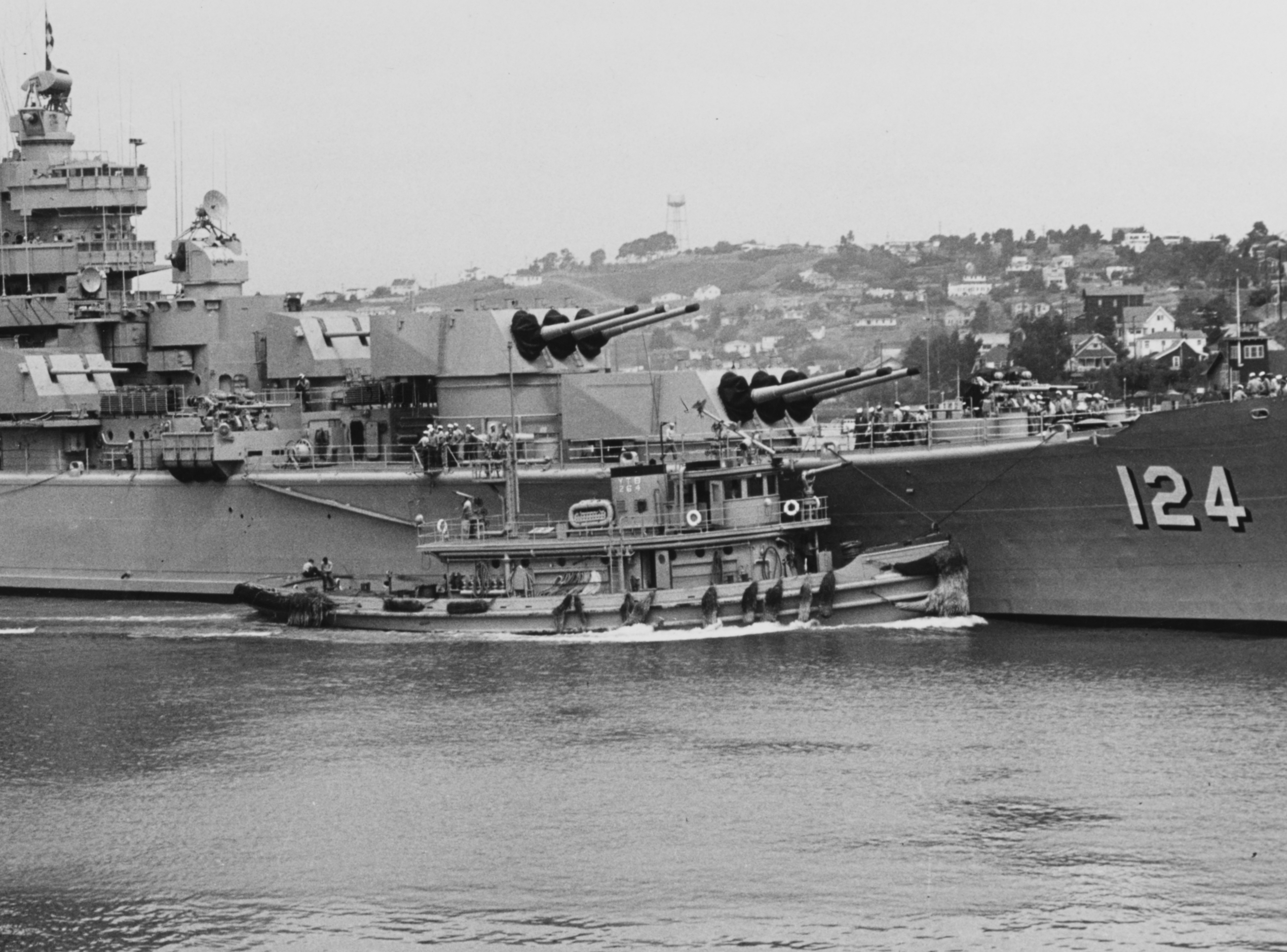
USS Awatobi (YTB-264) assists USS Rochester in departing Mare Island Naval Shipyard on 20 September 1953.

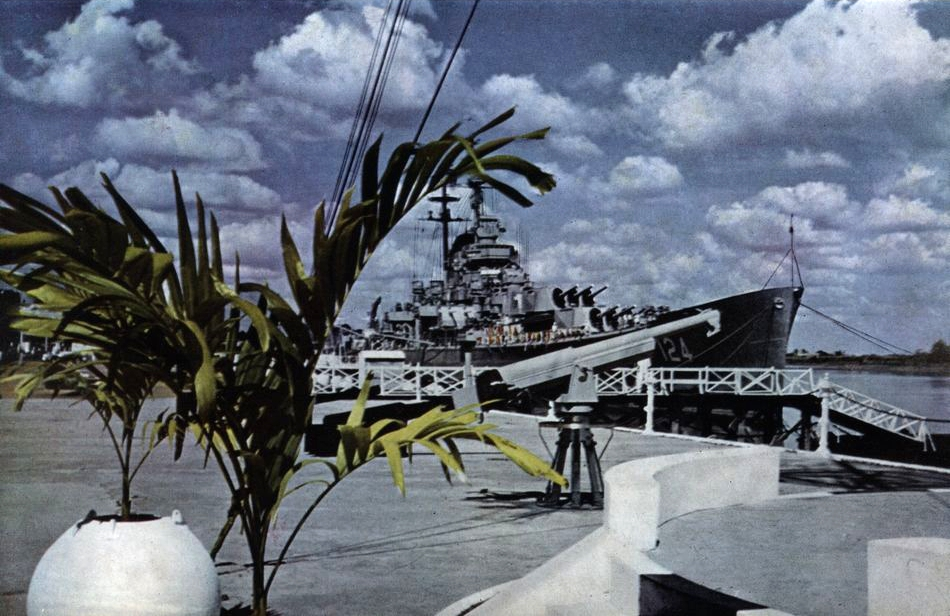
USS Rochester during a port visit in Saigon in late November 1957.

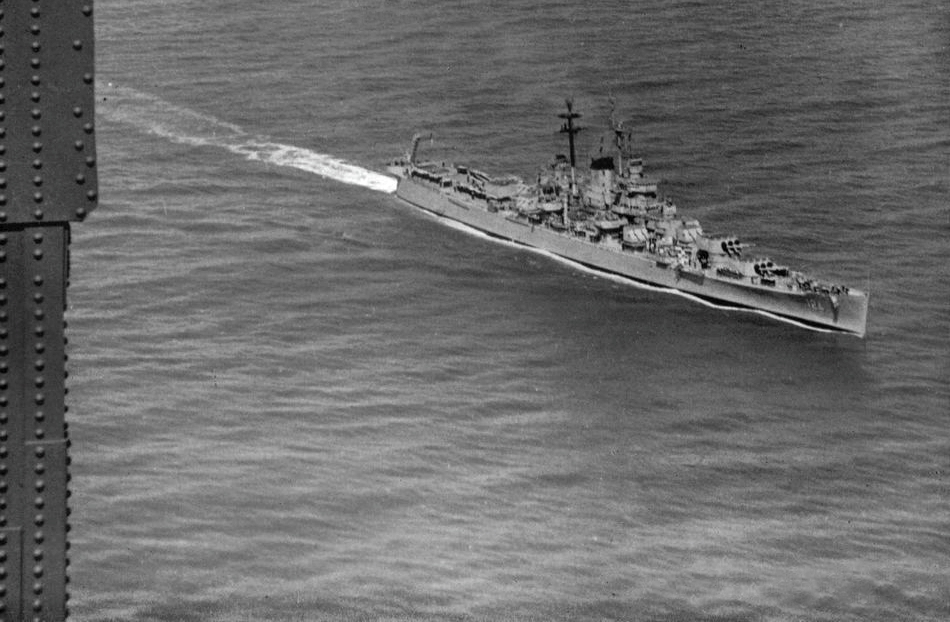
USS Rochester passing the Golden Gate Bridge in 1958.

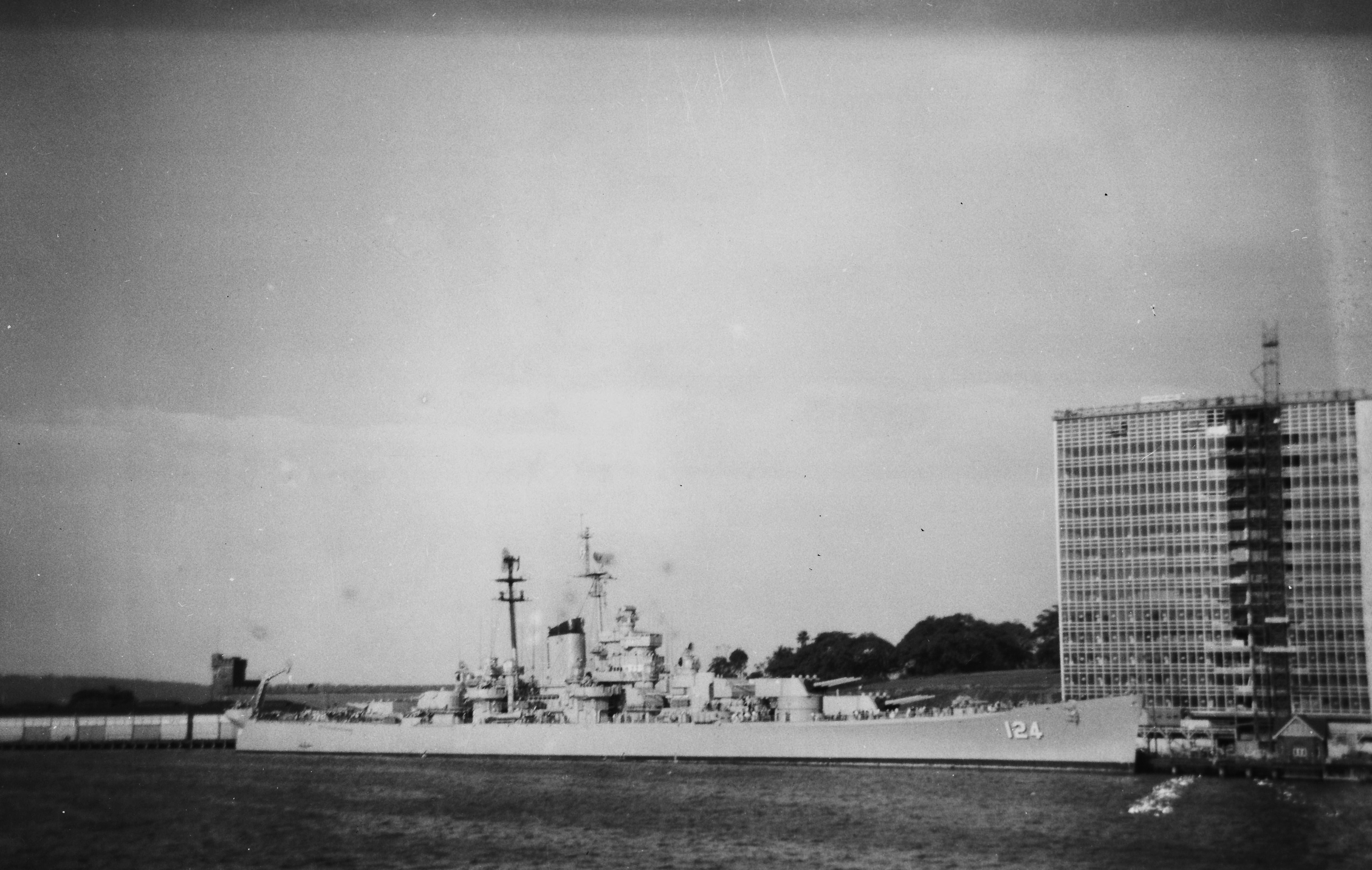
USS Rochester in Sydney in May 1958.

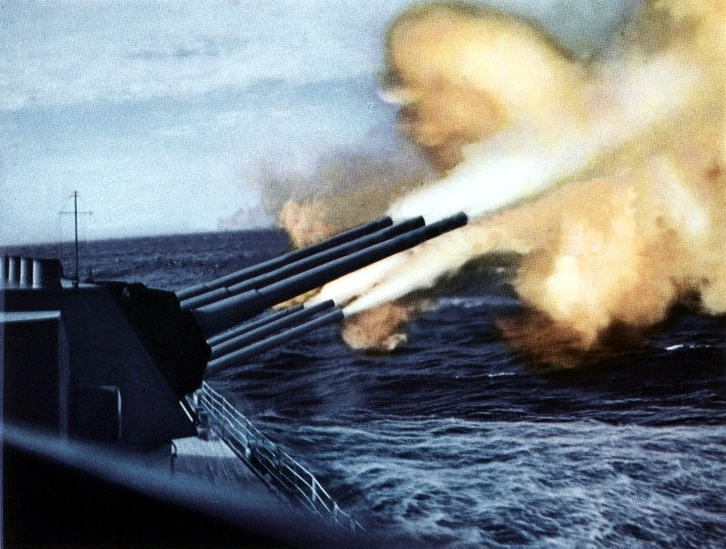
USS Rochester firing its 8-inch main guns during an exercise in 1958.

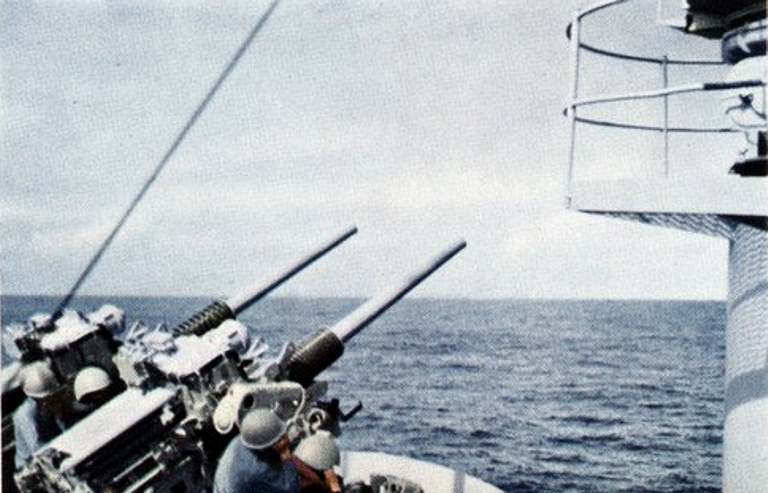
One of USS Rochester's 3-inch/50 caliber dual gun mounts in 1959.

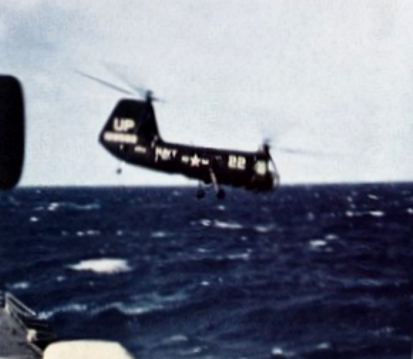
HUP Retriever from USS Rochester in flight in 1959.

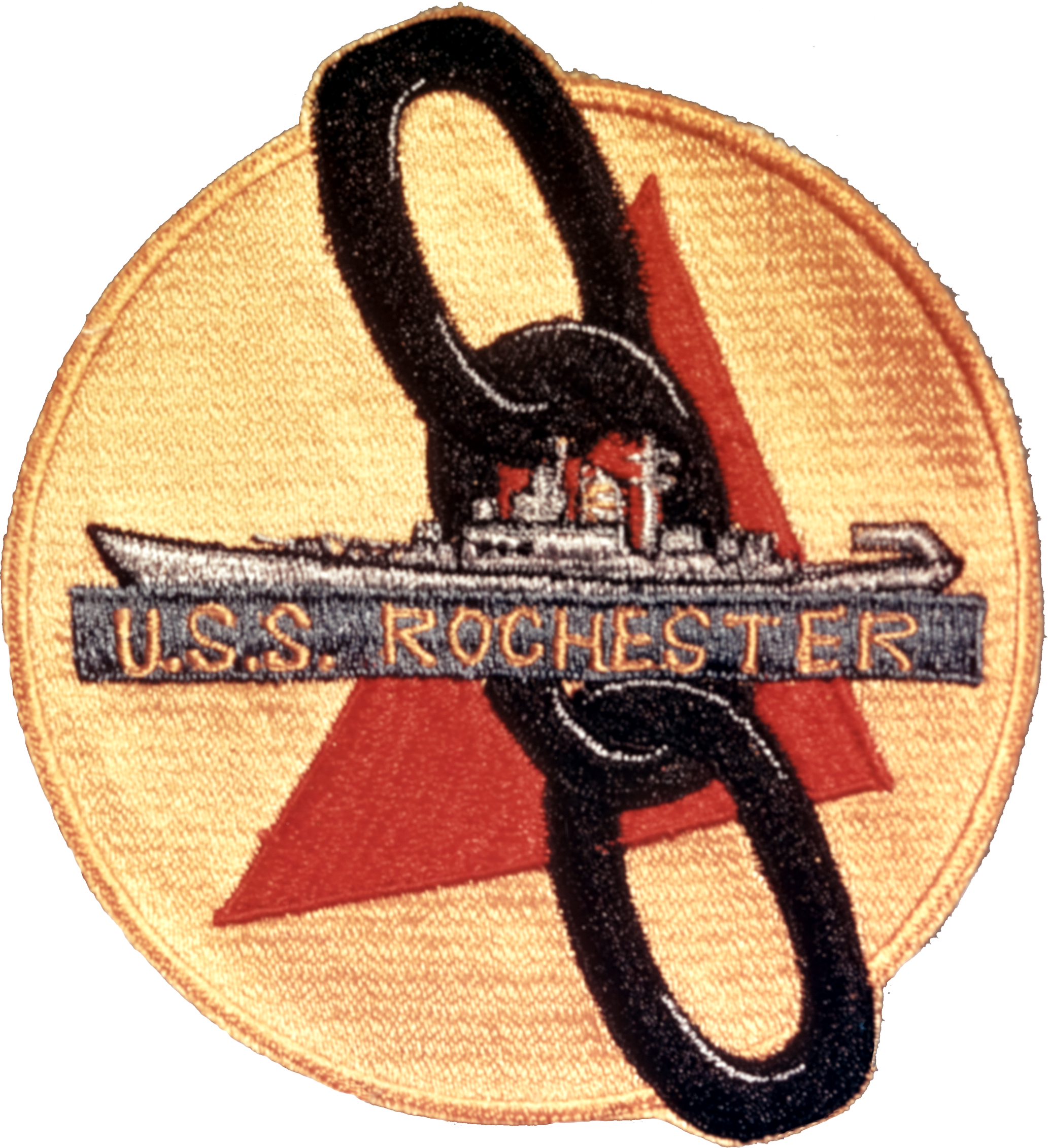
USS Rochester jacket patch 1959.
