= Oregon City-class cruiser =

U.S. Navy WWII-era heavy cruiser class

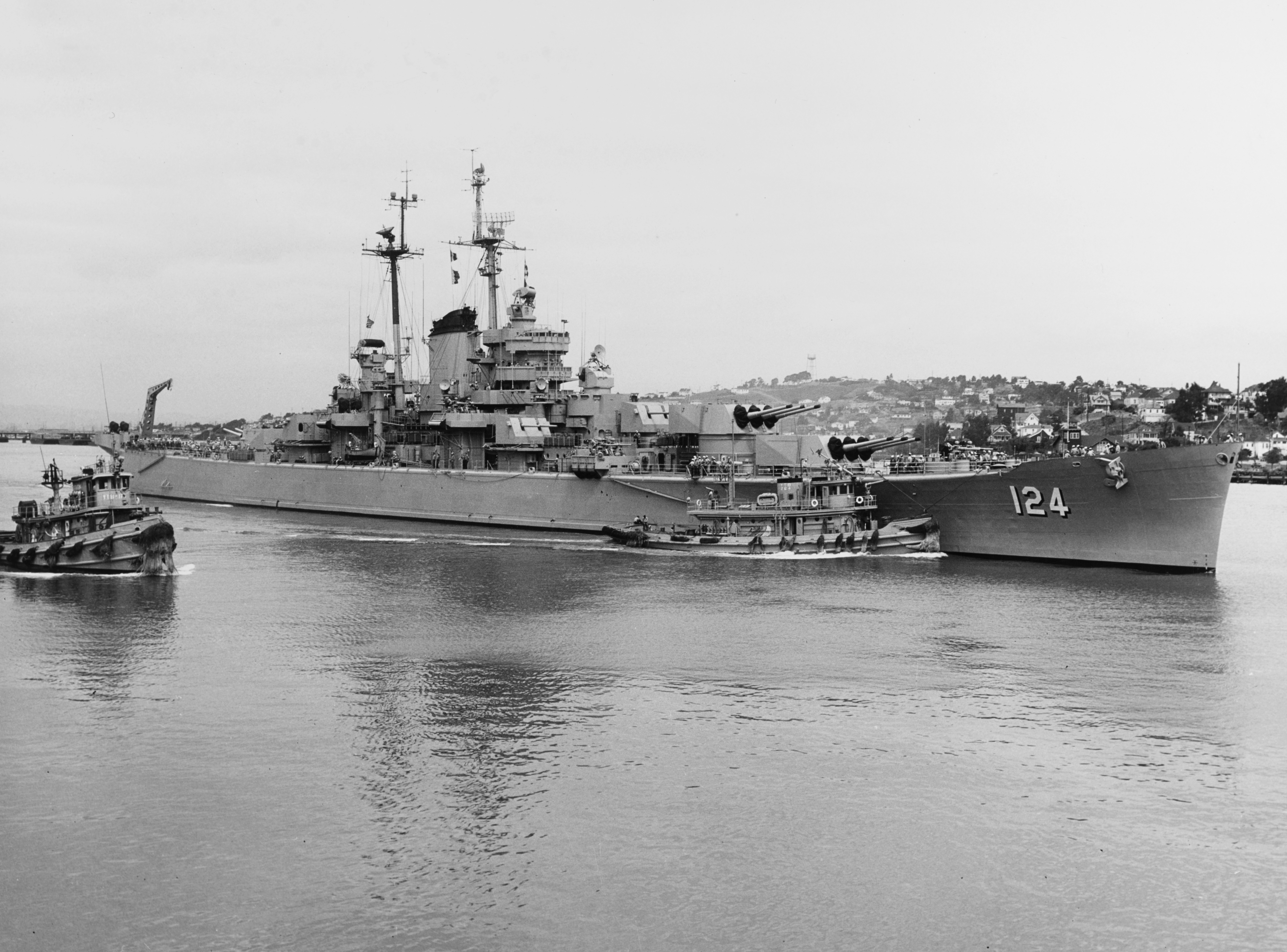
- USS Rochester on 20 September 1953

Class overview
- Name: Oregon City class
- Builders: Bethlehem Steel Corporation, Fore River Shipyard
- Operators: United States Navy
- Preceded by: Baltimore class
- Succeeded by: Des Moines class
- Subclasses: Albany class
- Built: 1944–1951
- In commission: 1946–1961 (Note: Albany was converted to a guided missile cruiser and as such was in commission from 1962 to 1980, but this was a totally different class of ship than an all-gun heavy cruiser. Northampton was decommissioned in 1970, but was completed as a command ship. Rochester, the last of the Oregon City class "gun cruisers" was decommissioned in 1961.)
- Planned: 10
- Completed: 4
- Canceled: 6
- Retired: 4

General characteristics
- Type: Heavy cruiser
- Displacement: 13,260 long-tons (standard)
- Length: 664 ft (202 m) wl; 673 ft 5 in (205.26 m) oa
- Beam: 70 ft 10 in (21.59 m)
- Draft: 26 ft 4 in (8.03 m)
- Propulsion: General Electric steam turbines turning 120,000 hp (89,000 kW)
- Speed: 32.4 knots (60.0 km/h; 37.3 mph)
- Boats & landing craft carried: 2 × lifeboats
- Complement: 1,142 officers and enlisted
- Sensors & processing systems: AN/SPS-6 air-search radar; AN/SPS-8A height-finding radar
- Armament: As Built: 3 × triple 8"/55 caliber guns; 6 × twin 5"/38 caliber guns; 11 × quad and 2 x twin Bofors 40 mm guns; 8 × single Oerlikon 20 mm cannons; Post-1953 (Albany, Rochester): 3 × triple 8"/55 caliber guns; 6 × twin 5"/38 caliber guns; 10 × twin 3"/50 caliber guns
- Armor: 6 Inch belt armor
- Aircraft carried: 4 × Vought OS2U Kingfishers
- Aviation facilities: 2 × aircraft catapults; Helipad (later conversion)

The Oregon City-class was a class of heavy cruiser of the United States Navy. Largely based on the preceding Baltimore-class of heavy cruiser, ten Oregon City-class ships were planned, but only four were completed. Of the completed ships, one was the USS Albany, which, in 1962, was converted to be the lead ship of the Albany-sub class of guided missile cruiser. Another vessel of the class, the USS Northampton, would be converted to a command ship in 1951. The completed ships were in-commission from 1946 to 1980, with the Albany being the final vessel of the class to serve. All vessels of the class were eventually sold for scrap.

== Design and development ==
The Oregon City-class cruisers were a modified version of the previous Baltimore-class design; the main difference was a more compact pyramidal superstructure with single trunked funnel, intended to improve the arcs of fire of the anti-aircraft (AA) guns. The same type of modification also differentiated the Cleveland and Fargo classes, and to a lesser degree the Atlanta and Juneau classes of light cruisers.

== History ==
Ten ships were authorized for the class with three being completed and the fourth suspended during construction. The final six ships were cancelled, five after being laid down. Construction on the incomplete fourth ship was resumed in 1948 and the ship served as a command ship Northampton (CLC-1). All three completed cruisers were commissioned in 1946. Oregon City was decommissioned after only 22 months of service, one of the shortest active careers of any World War II-era cruiser. Albany was later converted into a guided missile ship, becoming the lead ship of the Albany class and served until 1980. A similar conversion was planned for Rochester but was cancelled.

== Ships in class ==
Ships in class
Name	Hull Number	Builder	Laid down	Launched	Commissioned/ Recommissioned	Decommissioned	Fate
Oregon City	CA-122	Bethlehem Steel Corporation, Fore River Shipyard, Quincy, Massachusetts	8 April 1944	9 June 1945	16 February 1946	15 December 1947	Struck 1 November 1970; Sold for scrap, 17 August 1973
Albany	CA-123	Bethlehem Steel Corporation, Fore River Shipyard, Quincy, Massachusetts	6 Mar 1944	11 Jun 1945	15 June 1946	30 June 1958	Converted to Guided Missile Cruiser Struck 30 June 1985; Sold for scrap, 12 August 1990
Albany	CG-10	Bethlehem Steel Corporation, Fore River Shipyard, Quincy, Massachusetts	6 Mar 1944	11 Jun 1945	3 November 1962	29 August 1980	Converted to Guided Missile Cruiser Struck 30 June 1985; Sold for scrap, 12 August 1990
Rochester	CA-124	Bethlehem Steel Corporation, Fore River Shipyard, Quincy, Massachusetts	29 May 1944	28 August 1945	20 December 1946	15 August 1961	Struck 1 October 1973; Sold for scrap, 24 September 1974
Northampton	CA-125	Bethlehem Steel Corporation, Fore River Shipyard, Quincy, Massachusetts	31 August 1944	27 January 1951	7 March 1953	8 April 1970	Converted to command ship during construction – Struck and sold for scrap, 31 Dec 1977
Northampton	CLC-1	Bethlehem Steel Corporation, Fore River Shipyard, Quincy, Massachusetts	31 August 1944	27 January 1951	7 March 1953	8 April 1970	Converted to command ship during construction – Struck and sold for scrap, 31 Dec 1977
Cambridge	CA-126	Bethlehem Steel Corporation, Fore River Shipyard, Quincy, Massachusetts	16 December 1944	—N/a			Cancelled 12 August 1945 and scrapped on slip
Bridgeport	CA-127	Bethlehem Steel Corporation, Fore River Shipyard, Quincy, Massachusetts	13 January 1945	—N/a			Cancelled 12 August 1945 and scrapped on slip
Kansas City	CA-128	Bethlehem Steel Corporation, Fore River Shipyard, Quincy, Massachusetts	9 July 1945	—N/a			Cancelled 12 August 1945 and scrapped on slip
Tulsa	CA-129	Bethlehem Steel Corporation, Fore River Shipyard, Quincy, Massachusetts	—N/a	—N/a			Cancelled 12 August 1945
Norfolk	CA-137	Philadelphia Naval Shipyard	27 December 1944	—N/a			Cancelled 12 August 1945 and scrapped on slip
Scranton	CA-138	Philadelphia Naval Shipyard	27 December 1944	—N/a			Cancelled 12 August 1945 and scrapped on slip

== Gallery ==
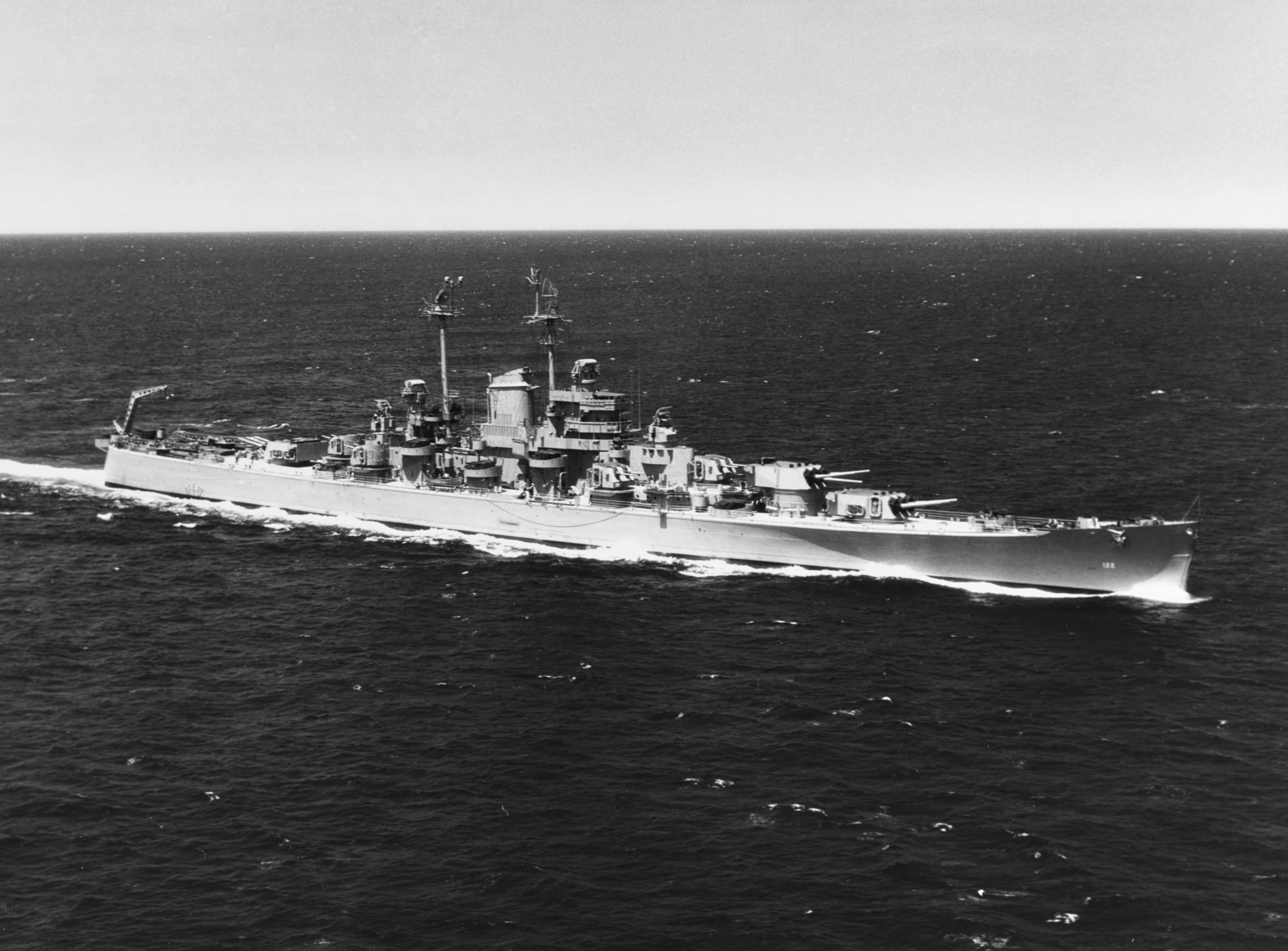
USS Oregon City

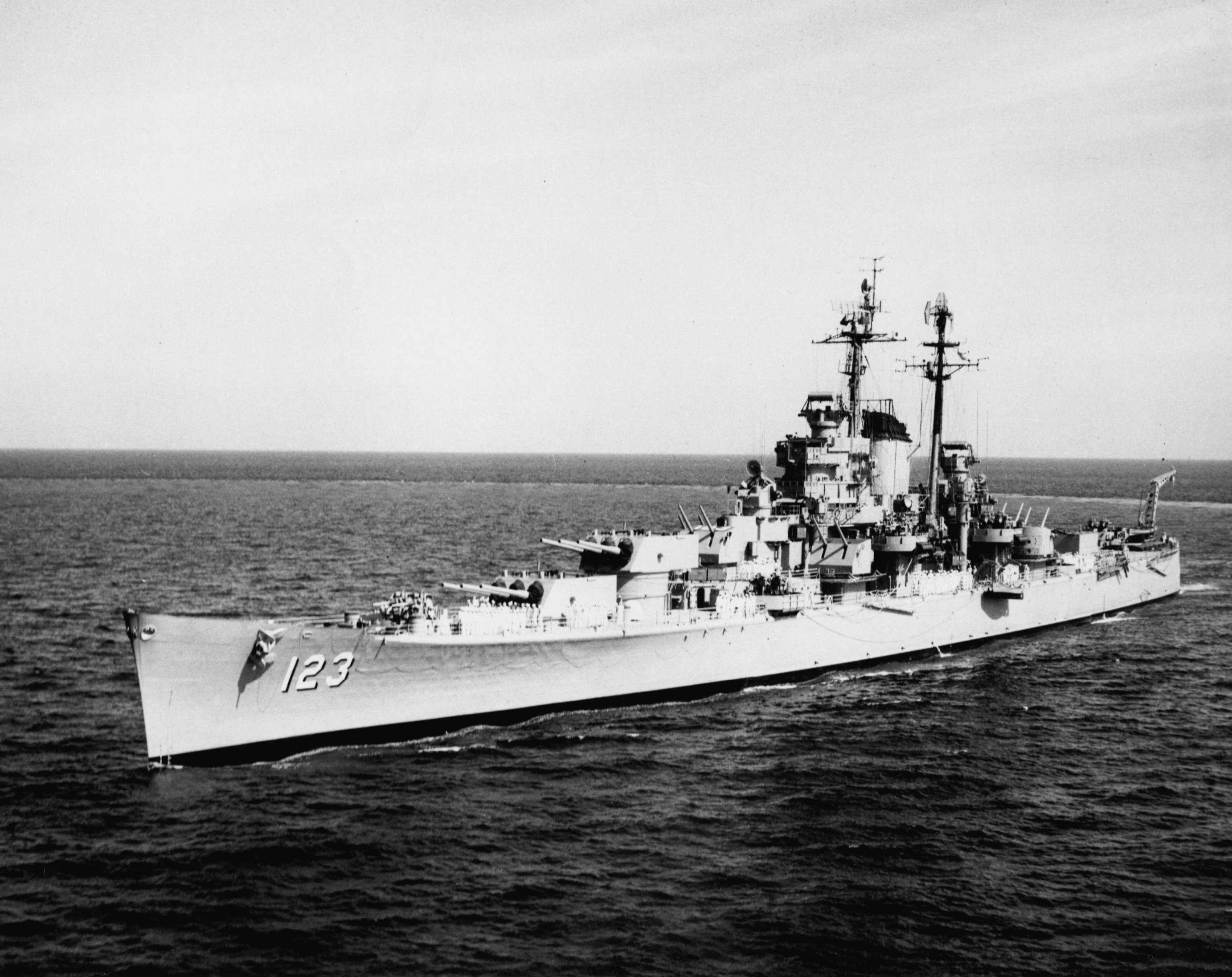
USS Albany

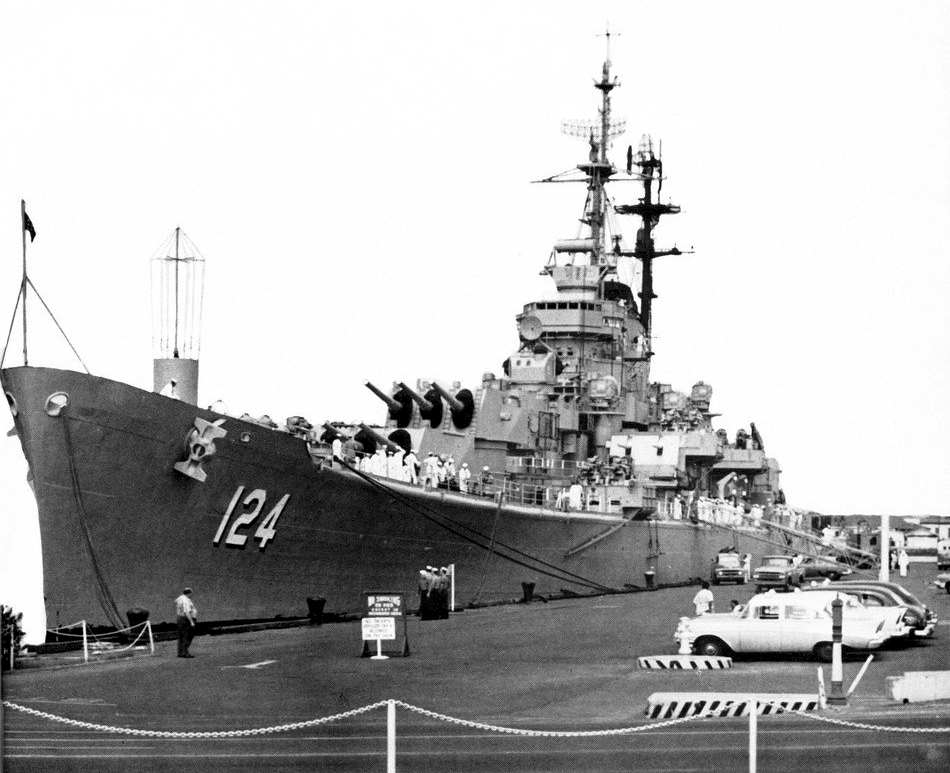
USS Rochester

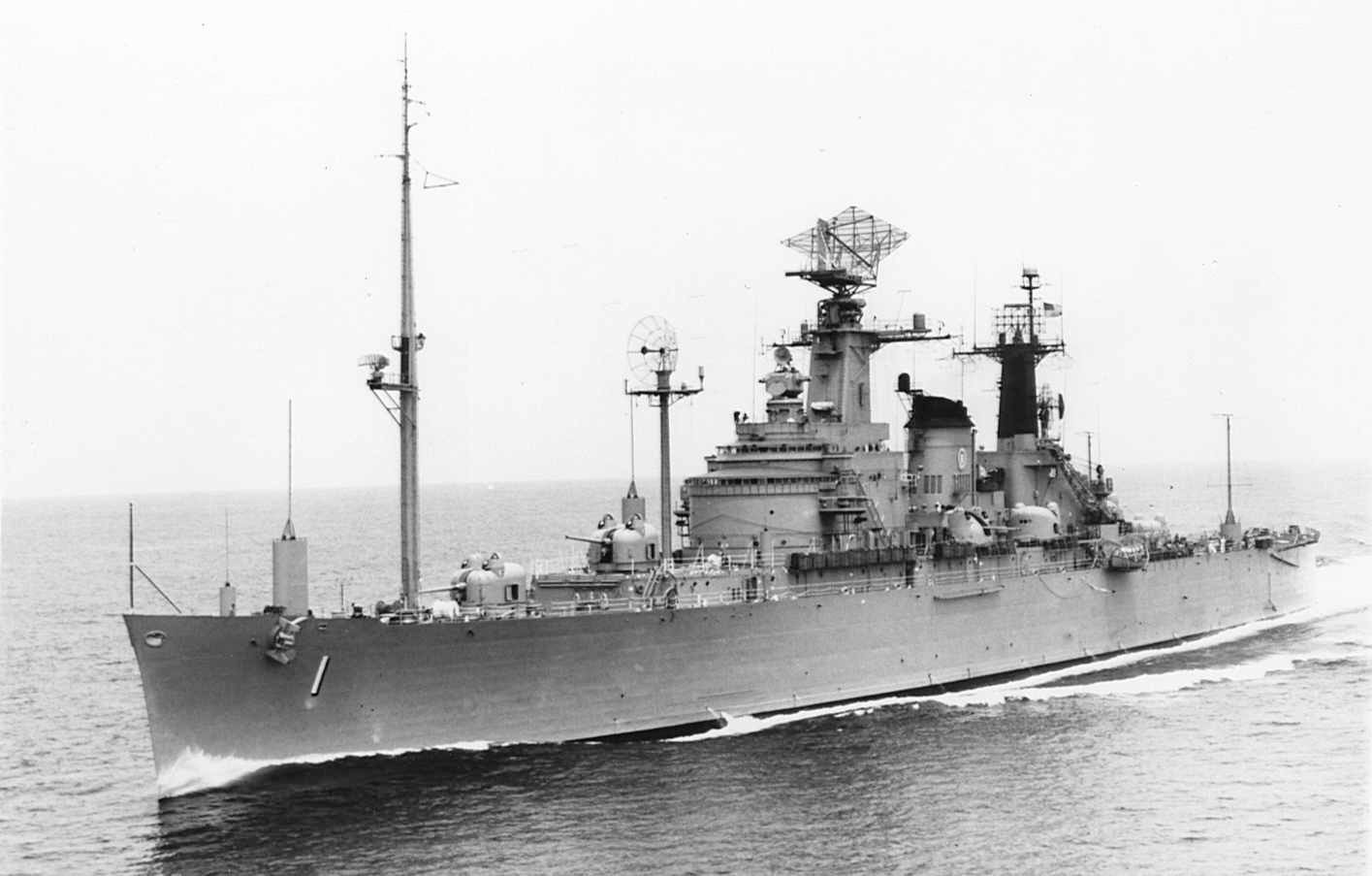
USS Northampton

== See also ==
- Albany-class cruiser
- List of cruisers of the United States Navy

== Bibliography ==
- Gardiner, Robert and Stephen Chumbley (editors). Conway's All The World's Fighting Ships 1947–1995. Annapolis, Maryland US: Naval Institute Press, 1995. ISBN 1-55750-132-7.
- Whitley, M.J. Cruisers of World War Two: An International Encyclopedia. London: Brockhampton Press, 1999. ISBN 1-86019-874-0,
