= USS Oregon City =

Heavy cruiser of the United States Navy

Coordinates: 45.3521485°N 122.6132664°W

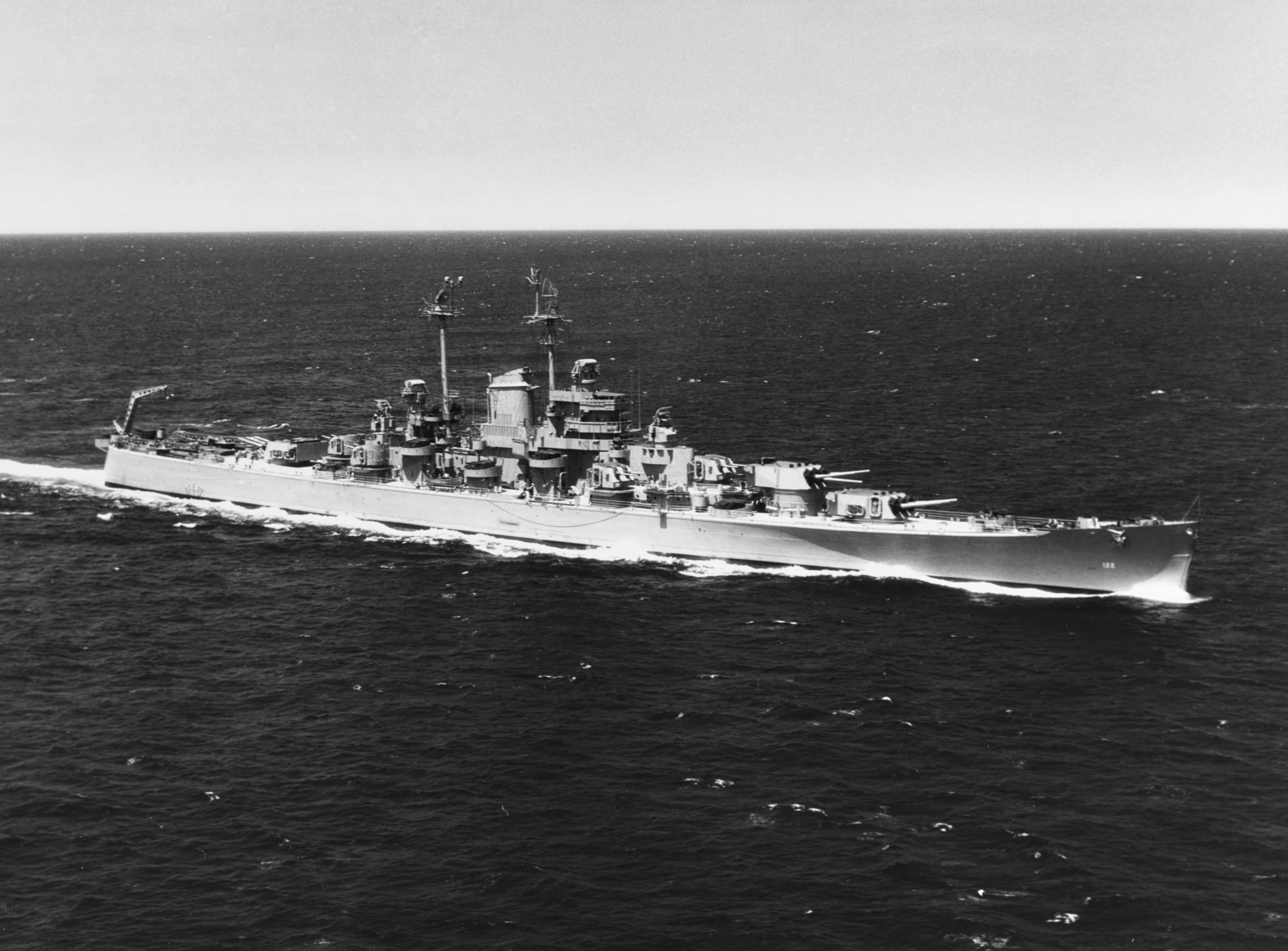
- USS Oregon City underway on 17 June 1946

History

United States
- Name: Oregon City
- Namesake: Oregon City, Oregon
- Builder: Bethlehem Steel
- Laid down: 8 April 1944
- Launched: 9 June 1945
- Commissioned: 16 February 1946
- Decommissioned: 15 December 1947
- Stricken: 1 November 1970
- Identification: Callsign: NHCP; Hull number: CA-122
- Honors and awards: See Awards
- Fate: Scrapped, 17 August 1973
- Notes: Bell at the Museum of the Oregon Territory

General characteristics
- Class & type: Oregon City-class cruiser
- Displacement: 13,700 tons
- Length: 673 ft 5 in (205.26 m)
- Beam: 70 ft 10 in (21.59 m)
- Draft: 26 ft 4 in (8.03 m)
- Propulsion: GE turbines 120,000 horsepower
- Speed: 32.4 kn (60.0 km/h)
- Complement: 1,142 officers and enlisted
- Armament: 9 × 8"/55 caliber guns; 12 × 5"/38 caliber guns; 48 × 40 mm guns; 20 × 20 mm guns
- Aircraft carried: Four amphibious scout planes

USS Oregon City (CA-122), the lead ship of the Oregon City class of heavy cruisers, was laid down 8 April 1944 by Bethlehem Steel Company, Quincy, Massachusetts; launched 9 June 1945; sponsored by the wife of Raymond P. Canfield, the City Commissioner of Oregon City, Oregon. Newspapers showed pictures of celebrated radio, film and television personality Bing Crosby adding a bit of glamour to the launching. The Oregon City was commissioned 16 February 1946.

Oregon City was named for the city in the state of Oregon. Oregon City departed Boston 31 March 1946 for shakedown out of Guantanamo Bay Naval Base, then returned to Boston in mid-May. Oregon City became flagship of the United States Fourth Fleet on 3 July and the following month began dockside training of reservists in Philadelphia. From 6 to 19 October she made a post-war Reserve Training Cruise, to Bermuda, then sailed to Boston and remained until the following March with a somewhat reduced complement. Reassigned to the 2nd Fleet in January 1947, Oregon City's crew had returned to full strength by the time she sailed for Guantánamo Bay 30 March. After three weeks of exercises she returned to Boston, not sailing again until 6 June. She embarked midshipmen at Annapolis on the 21st, then sailed for the Canal Zone and the Caribbean on an annual summer training cruise.

Oregon City debarked her midshipmen at Norfolk in mid-August and sailed for Philadelphia and deactivation. She was decommissioned on 15 December 1947. She was the only Oregon City-class ship to be decommissioned soon after completion, and was not selected for conversion to a missile ship. Her bell was sent back to Oregon where it is on display at the Museum of the Oregon Territory in Oregon City, Oregon. She was stricken 1 November 1970, and sold 17 September 1973 to Union Minerals and Alloys Corporation, NYC, and scrapped in Kearny, New Jersey the following year. Her five-foot gun houses could still be seen well into the 1990s at Philadelphia Navy Yard.

The bell originally from USS Oregon City was presented to Portland Area Naval Reserve through the people of Oregon City, Oregon on 8 March 1975 and it is now on display at the Museum of Oregon Territory. A model of her is also on displayed there.

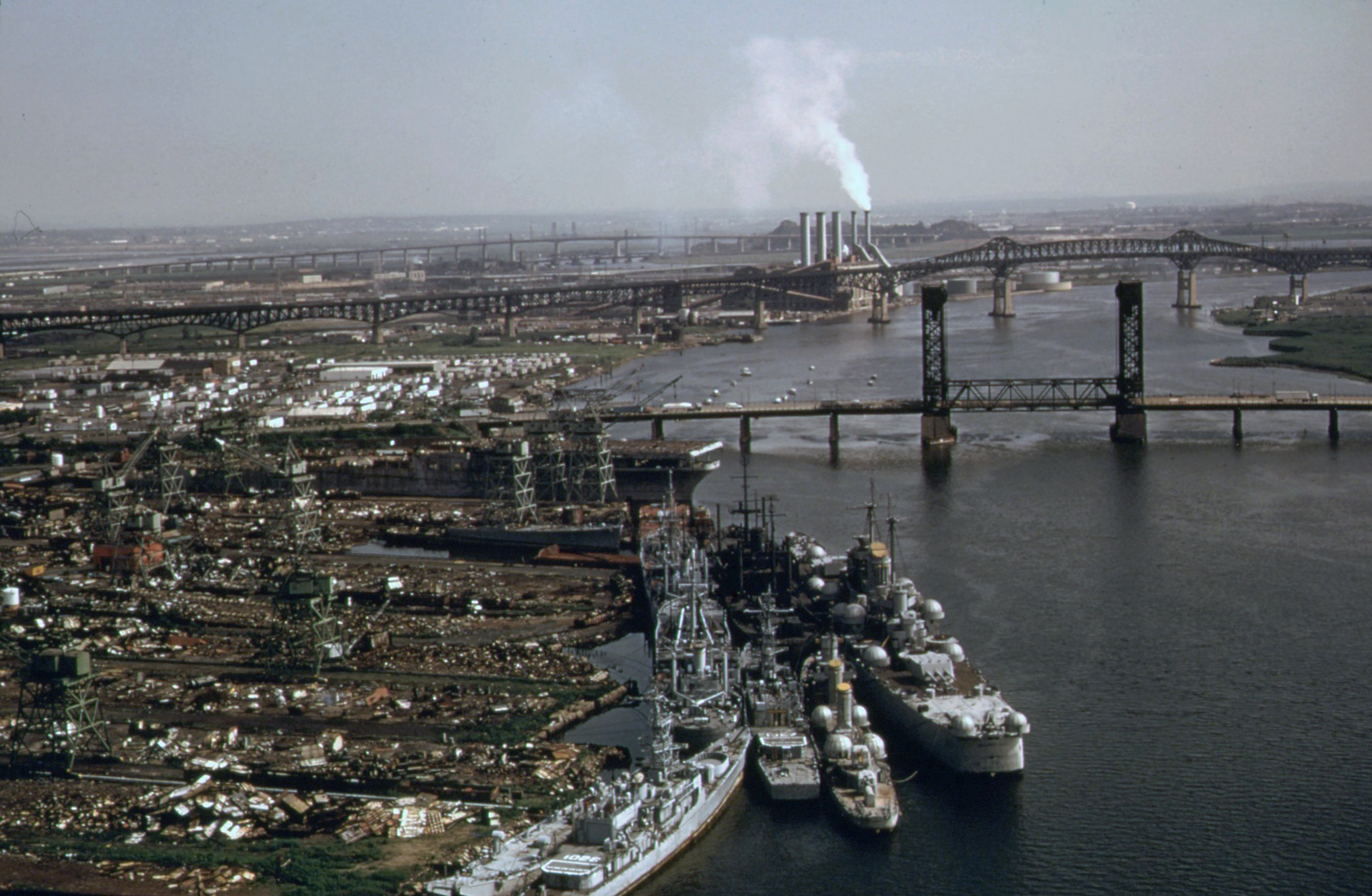
Oregon City among ships awaiting scrapping on Hackensack River, 1974

== Gallery ==
USS Oregon City Lifecycle

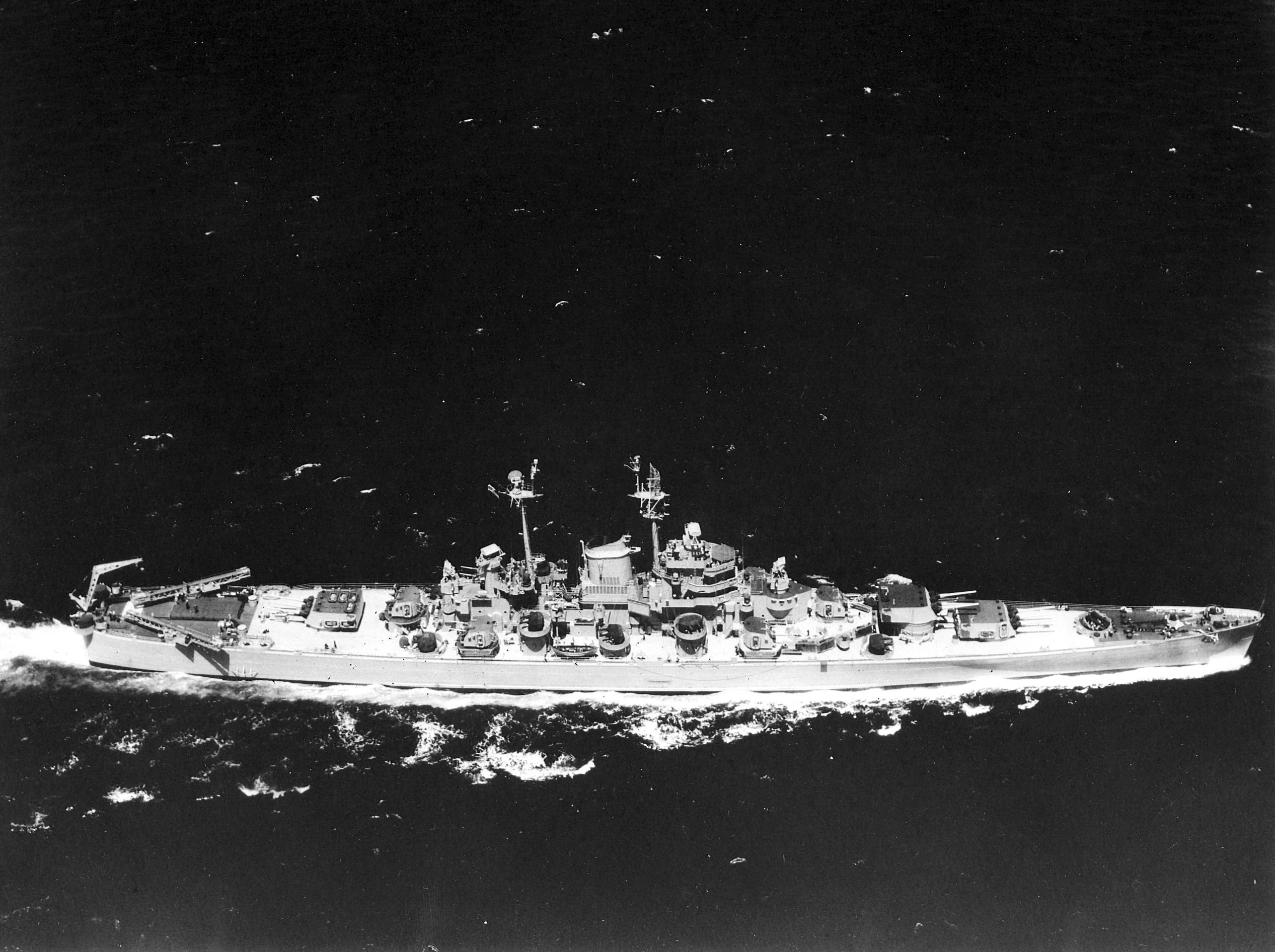
Oregon City underway in 1946.

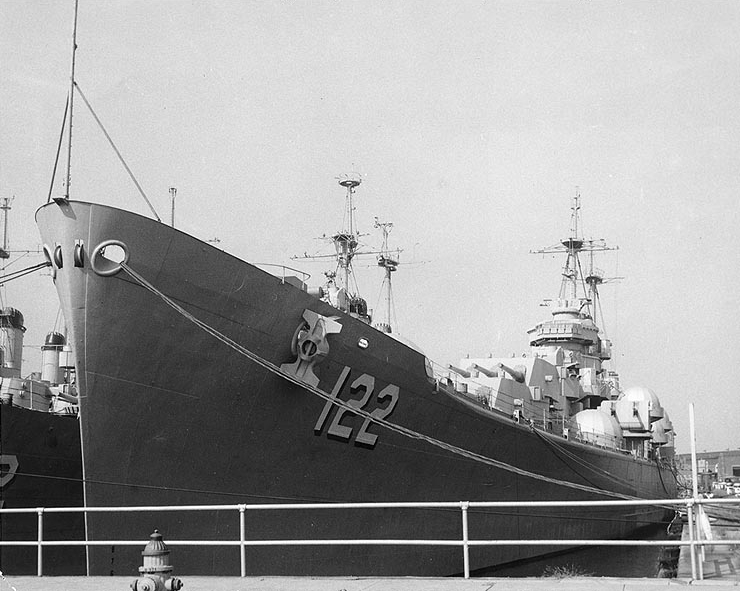
Oregon City mothballed at Philadelphia in 1959.

== Awards ==
- American Campaign Medal
- World War 2 Victory Medal
- National Defense Service Medal
