= Autoloader =

Mechanical ordnance loader

An autoloader or auto-loader is a mechanical aid or replacement for the personnel that load ammunition into crew-served weapons without being an integrated part of the gun itself. The term is generally only applied to larger weapons, such as naval weapons, tanks, and artillery; that would otherwise have a dedicated person or persons loading them.

An autoloader extracts a shell and propellant charge from the ammunition storage rack/compartment and loads it into a magazine or belt, if the gun has one, or directly into the chamber of the gun if it does not. It often replaces a human loader. Automation can streamline and speed the loading process, resulting in a more effective design.

The potential benefits of an autoloader in a vehicle is a higher firerate and a smaller turret and crew amount. The autoloader takes up internal space and could need room in the turret ring like the Des Moines-class cruiser or require an extended turret bustle like the Type 90 tank, and is also more mechanically complex than manual loading.

== History ==
Autoloaders were developed at the beginning of World War II. Their first combat use was in "tank-buster" aircraft such as the 75mm caliber Bordkanone BK 7.5 cannon-equipped Henschel Hs 129 B-3. Every Soviet and Russian-derived tank since the T-64 main battle tank has used an autoloader. Their use has been mostly shunned by American and British tanks, despite the American T22E1 medium tank being one of the first tank designs to use an autoloader.

After the middle 20th century, autoloading became common on large 76.2 mm (3.00 in) caliber or greater naval guns. The size of the shells, when combined with the more elaborate autoloading facilities available in the wider spaces of a ship, makes an autoloader much faster than human loaders. For example, the US 5"/38 Mark 12 can load about 20 rounds per minute.

The advent of jet aircraft, and the rate of fire required to engage them, hastened the adoption of automatic loaders on naval artillery. Development was often problematic, and reliability was seriously compromised in many cases. The US 5"/54 caliber Mark 42 gun was derated from 40 rounds per minute to 34 to improve reliability. The US 3"/70 Mark 37 actually spent more time in design (13 years) than in service (12 years) due to severe unreliability. These problems are largely of the past and the field has advanced a great deal.

== Features ==
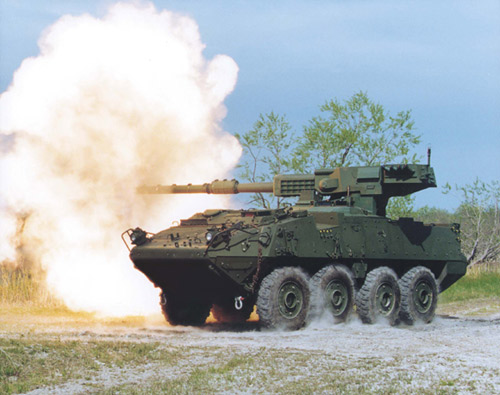
The American M1128 mobile gun system autoloader holds up to 18 rounds.

=== Rate of fire ===
The Soviet/Russian AK-130 (twin barrel naval 130 mm (5.1 in)), using autoloading, can achieve up to 40 rounds per barrel per minute. The Italian 127 mm/5" Compact has similar performance. The largest caliber auto-loading naval rifles were the US 8"/55 Mark 16, deployed on the three cruisers of the Des Moines class in the late 1940s, and the 8"/55 Mark 71 tested aboard the destroyer USS Hull in the late 1970s. Both weapons achieved a rate of fire of 12 rounds per barrel per minute, compared to 3-4 rounds per minute for the preceding hand-loaded weapons.

A modern tank autoloader for a 120 mm (4.7 in) and 125 mm (4.9 in) caliber weapon in good condition can achieve about 10-12 rounds per minute. This rating may or may not include the time required to bring the gun to the appropriate loading angle (if required) and then bringing it back up to firing angle after loading. The autoloader on the cancelled Object 640 "Black Eagle" tank was supposed to have up to 15 rounds per minute rate of fire.

For weapons above 127 mm (5.0 in), the increased weight of the round pushes this issue decisively in favor of the autoloader. For self-propelled artillery with calibers of around 152 mm (6.0 in) and 155 mm (6.1 in), for example, autoloaders can typically achieve 8–12 rounds per minute, while (a) human loader(s) can typically achieve 4 rounds per minute. For sustained bombardments, this may not be so important. Sustained firing rates for artillery are typically only 1–2 rounds per minute, but the rapid-fire capability is vital to shoot-and-scoot tactics to deliver enough fire and then avoid the rapid counterbattery response provided by modern counterbattery systems. On the other hand, even during sustained bombardment an autoloader could be useful, as the fatigue issues of loading an artillery piece for hours (i.e. 155 mm (6.1 in) projectile weighs ~45 kg (99 lb)) do not affect them.

In addition, an artillery piece with an autoloader and powerful fire control system can use the multiple rounds simultaneous impact technique, firing several shells with varying propellant charges so all of them land on their targets simultaneously.

=== Survivability ===
The most common tank autoloaders store their ammunition in the turret basket, increasing the possibility of a catastrophic explosion should the armor around the hull or turret be penetrated. More armor protection, and isolation/separation of the ammunition from the crew compartment has traditionally been available in tanks with a human loader, which can decrease the possibility of cook-off, or protect the crew in case of an ammunition explosion. For example, the M1 Abrams was designed to protect the crew from cooking off, which is accomplished by storing the main gun ammunition in a compartment at the rear of the turret. The compartment is separated from the crew by a power-operated armored door, which is only opened for a couple of seconds each time the loader needs to grab another round. The roof of the compartment has blowout panels, are armored against outside attack but much less resistant to pressure from inside, so that if the compartment is penetrated by enemy fire the panels will open, venting the explosion generated by the ammunition and protect the crew while keeping the tank in one piece. Other western designs from the later Cold War era to the present with manual loading have similar protective features. In contrast, the Soviet tanks of the Cold War which employ autoloaders store the ammunition on a carousel in the middle of the crew compartment, where any penetration by enemy fire is likely to incinerate the crew and blow the turret right off the top of the tank (known as the jack-in-the-box effect). This is made worse by the fact that autoloader holds only a limited number of rounds, while the remaining ammunition is stored around the crew compartment. Result is that even if the carousel itself is not hit, ammunition stored around the tank may still ignite due to a penetrating hit, and thus set off the ammunition in the carousel.

Some Western designs, such as the Leclerc tank, store the primary ammunition in an isolated compartment in the turret bustle, with blowout panels on top and the ramming mechanism underneath or in the middle. This allows for much better crew protection but the loading mechanism, taking up space in the ammunition compartment, reduces the available number of rounds that can be carried. Therefore, such a tank usually stores additional ammo in compartmentalized storage at the bottom of the fighting compartment, like older manual loading tank designs. This storage can be surrounded by water, but the reduced crew must still transfer this ammunition to the autoloader at some point. However, such a design can also allow for the rapid replacement of the autoloader and reloading of the ready ammunition by making the compartment at the rear of the turret a modular component that can be easily replaced with appropriate support equipment, similar to how the US M270 MLRS system is reloaded. Another possible advantage is that the door that separates the turret can be only large enough for one round of ammunition to slide through, rather than extending across the entire rear of the turret as in the case of the M1 Abrams – this could save additional mass and reduce the power necessary to operate the door, by using less armor for the same level of protection, since it would be part of the turret instead of a sliding component in a heavy frame.

=== Size ===
Autoloaders are often implemented in an attempt to reduce tank size and profile. The Stridsvagn 103 and T-64 are examples of this, both being significantly lower in profile than contemporaries with manually loaded guns and a fourth loader crewmember.

=== Crew reduction ===
The replacement of the loader and gunner with a commander and driver could allow crewmembers to rotate shifts. This would enable continuous operations on the battlefield. Though in some retrofit cases (Abrams tank for example) there is nothing in the fitting of an autoloader that requires the removal of the loader. In such situations the autoloader frees up the fourth crew-member to support the other three full-time, instead of just part-time when they are not doing their main job.

The disadvantage of the need to keep most of the ammunition close to the autoloader can be actually turned into an advantage by using an unmanned turret design with a crew capsule. In this case, all the necessary ammunition can be kept in direct access to the autoloader, without affecting the safety of the crew, because the crew compartment is completely separate from the autoloader and ammunition. Modern examples of this design are the Russian T-14 "Armata" MBT and the Polish PL-01 light tank.

== Adoption ==
The current generation of tanks using autoloaders (Russian T-72, T-80, T-90 and T-14, Japanese Type 90 and Type 10, Chinese Type 96 and Type 99, South Korean K2 Black Panther, French Leclerc, Sino-Pakistani Al-Khalid MBT, North Korean M2020, Iranian Zulfiqar and Karrar, Indonesian/Turkish Kaplan MT / Harimau) all weigh between 45–55 tons. Tanks that do not use autoloaders tend to weigh in the 55–70 ton range (American M1A2 Abrams, German Leopard 2, Indian Arjun, British Challenger 2, Turkish Altay, Israeli Merkava, and Italian C1 Ariete).
