= Des Moines-class cruiser =

Early Cold War-era heavy cruiser class of the U.S. Navy

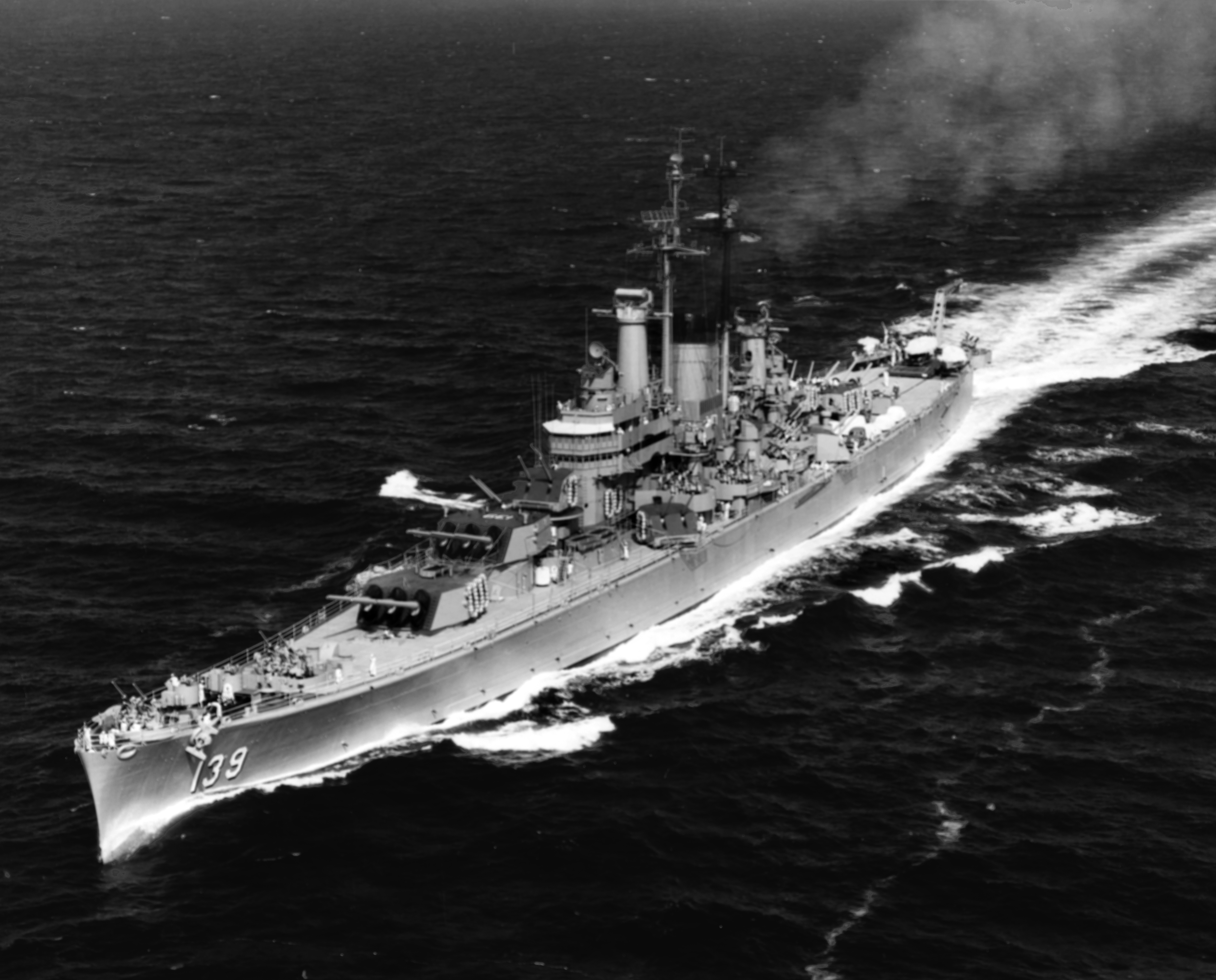
- Salem on 16 June 1952

Class overview
- Name: Des Moines-class
- Builders: Bethlehem, Fore River, MA (2); Newport News Shipbuilding, VA (1)
- Operators: United States Navy
- Preceded by: Oregon City class
- Succeeded by: None
- Built: 1945-1949
- In commission: 1948–1975
- Planned: 12
- Completed: 3
- Canceled: 9
- Retired: 3
- Scrapped: 2
- Preserved: 1

General characteristics (as built)
- Type: Heavy cruiser
- Displacement: 17,255 long tons (17,532 t) (standard); 20,933 long tons (21,269 t) (full load)
- Length: 700 ft (213.4 m) wl; 716 ft 6 in (218.4 m) oa
- Beam: 76 ft 6 in (23.3 m)
- Draft: 22 ft (6.7 m)
- Installed power: 4 boilers; 120,000 shp (89,000 kW)
- Propulsion: 4 shafts; 4 steam turbine sets
- Speed: 33 kn (61 km/h; 38 mph)
- Range: 10,500 nmi (19,400 km; 12,100 mi) at 15 kn (28 km/h; 17 mph)
- Complement: 1,799 officers and enlisted
- Sensors & processing systems: AN/SPS-6 air-search radar; SP fighter directional radar
- Armament: 3 × triple 8"/55 caliber guns; 6 × twin 5"/38 caliber guns; 12 × twin 3"/50 caliber guns; 12 × single Oerlikon 20 mm cannons
- Armor: Belt: 4-6 in (102-152 mm); Deck: 3.5 in (89 mm); Turrets: 2-8 in (51-203 mm); Barbettes: 6.3 in (160 mm); Conning tower: 6.5 in (165 mm)
- Aviation facilities: 2 × aircraft catapults

The Des Moines-class cruisers were a trio of U.S. Navy (USN) heavy cruisers commissioned in 1948 and 1949. Largely based on the earlier Baltimore-class heavy cruisers, the Des Moines-class featured improved torpedo protection and heavier anti-aircraft armament. Relatively well-armored and protected, the class was unique in that it mounted nine of the world’s first auto-loading large-caliber guns, the 8-inch (203 mm) Mark 16 guns. These guns enabled Des Moines-class cruisers to fire two to three times faster than earlier 8 in guns with each barrel capable of 8-10 rounds per minute. They were the last of the “all-gun” heavy cruisers (with the Worcester-class representing the final "all-gun" light cruisers) and were exceeded in size within the USN only by the 30,000-long-ton (30,481 t) Alaska-class "large cruisers" that straddled the line between heavy cruisers and battlecruisers. USS Des Moines (CA-134) and USS Salem (CA-139) were decommissioned by 1961 but USS Newport News (CA-148) served until 1975. Salem is a museum ship in Quincy, Massachusetts (near Salem, Massachusetts, the ship's namesake); Des Moines and Newport News were scrapped.

== Description ==
Derived from the Baltimore-class heavy cruisers, they were larger, had an improved machinery layout and carried a new design of auto-loading, rapid-fire 8"/55 gun (the Mk16). The improved Mk16 guns of the main battery were the first auto-loading 8" guns fielded by the US Navy and allowed a much higher rate of fire than earlier designs, capable of sustaining eight to ten shots per minute per barrel, about twice that previous heavy cruisers could. The auto-loading mechanism could function at any elevation, giving some anti-aircraft capability. While the secondary battery of six twin 5"/38 Mk12 DP guns was essentially unchanged from the Oregon City and Baltimore-class cruisers, the Des Moines class carried a stronger battery of small-caliber anti-aircraft guns, including 12 twin 3-inch/50 Mk27 and later Mk33 guns, that were considered superior to the earlier ships' quad-mounted 40mm Bofors against contemporary airborne threats.

== History ==
Twelve ships of the class were planned, but only three were completed: Des Moines (CA-134), Salem (CA-139) and Newport News (CA-148), with USS Dallas (CA-140) canceled when approximately 28 percent complete.

Their speed made them valuable to escort carrier groups and they were useful in showing the flag in goodwill visits. The first two were decommissioned in 1961 and 1959, respectively, but Newport News remained in commission until 1975, serving for a long period (1962–1968) as United States Second Fleet flagship, and providing valuable gunfire support off Vietnam from 1967 to 1973. The ship's missions included shelling targets close to the North Vietnam shoreline. In August 1972 she raided Haiphong harbor at night with other US Navy ships to shell coastal defenses, surface-to-air missile sites and Cat Bi airfield.

Newport News was the last active all-gun cruiser (serving 25.5 years continuously) and the first completely air-conditioned surface ship in the U.S. Navy. Salem is a museum ship in Quincy, Massachusetts. Newport News was laid up at the Philadelphia Naval Shipyard and scrapped in 1993, while Des Moines was scrapped from 2006–2007. Dallas (CA-140) and eight other ships (CA-141 through CA-143 and CA-149 through CA-153) were canceled at the end of World War II.

== Ships in class ==
Construction data
Ship	Hull No.	Builder	Laid down	Launched	Commissioned	Decommissioned	Fate
Des Moines	CA-134	Bethlehem Steel Corporation, Fore River Shipyard, Quincy, Massachusetts	28 May 1945	27 September 1946	16 November 1948	6 July 1961	Struck 9 July 1991, scrapped 2007
Salem	CA-139	Bethlehem Steel Corporation, Fore River Shipyard, Quincy, Massachusetts	4 July 1945	25 March 1947	14 May 1949	30 January 1959	Struck 12 July 1991, museum ship at Quincy, Massachusetts
Dallas	CA-140	Bethlehem Steel Corporation, Fore River Shipyard, Quincy, Massachusetts	15 October 1945	—N/a			Cancelled, 6 June 1946 (28% completed)
—N/a	CA-141	Bethlehem Steel Corporation, Fore River Shipyard, Quincy, Massachusetts	—N/a				Cancelled, 7 January 1946
—N/a	CA-142	Bethlehem Steel Corporation, Fore River Shipyard, Quincy, Massachusetts	—N/a				Cancelled, 12 August 1945
—N/a	CA-143	Bethlehem Steel Corporation, Fore River Shipyard, Quincy, Massachusetts	—N/a				Cancelled, 12 August 1945
Newport News	CA-148	Newport News Shipbuilding, Newport News, Virginia	1 October 1945	6 March 1948	29 January 1949	27 June 1975	Struck 31 July 1978, Sold for scrap, 25 February 1993
—N/a	CA-149	Newport News Shipbuilding, Newport News, Virginia	—N/a				Cancelled, 12 August 1945
—N/a	CA-150	New York Shipbuilding Corporation, Camden, New Jersey	—N/a				Cancelled, 12 August 1945
—N/a	CA-151	New York Shipbuilding Corporation, Camden, New Jersey	—N/a				Cancelled, 12 August 1945
—N/a	CA-152	New York Shipbuilding Corporation, Camden, New Jersey	—N/a				Cancelled, 12 August 1945
—N/a	CA-153	New York Shipbuilding Corporation, Camden, New Jersey	—N/a				Cancelled, 12 August 1945

== Gallery ==
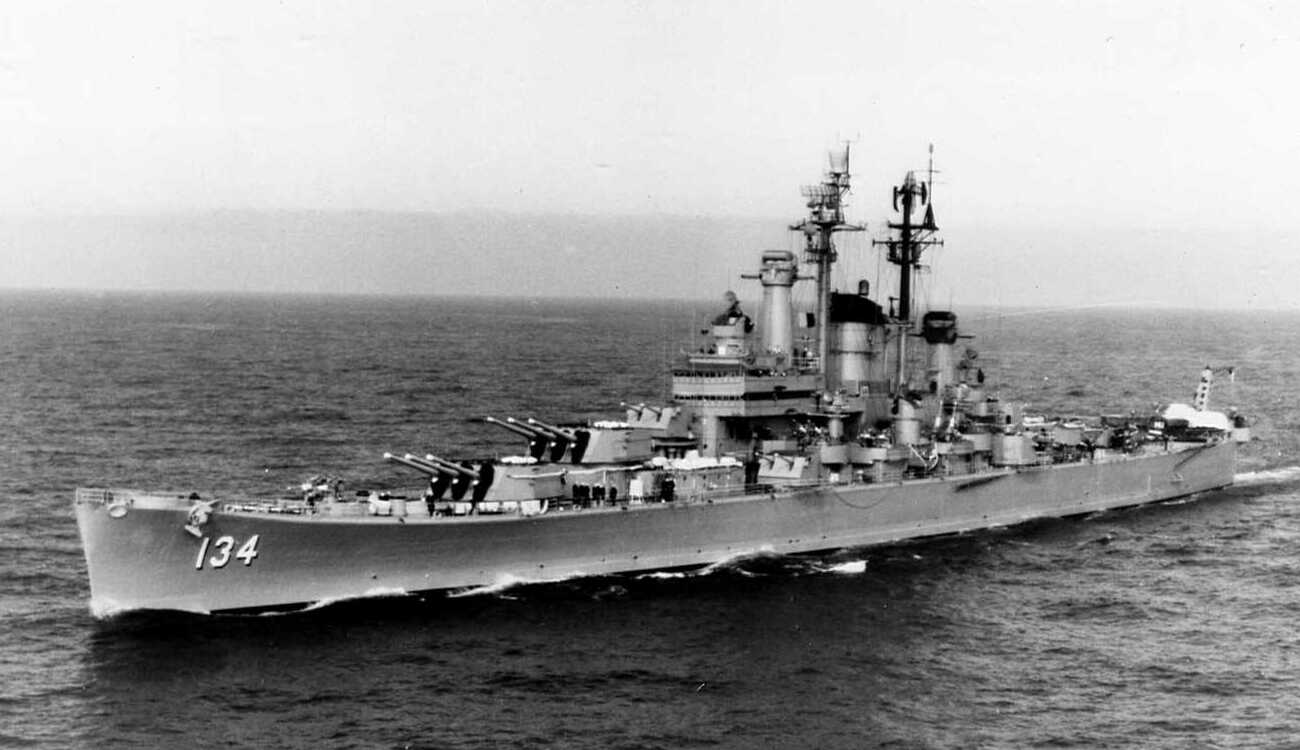
USS Des Moines

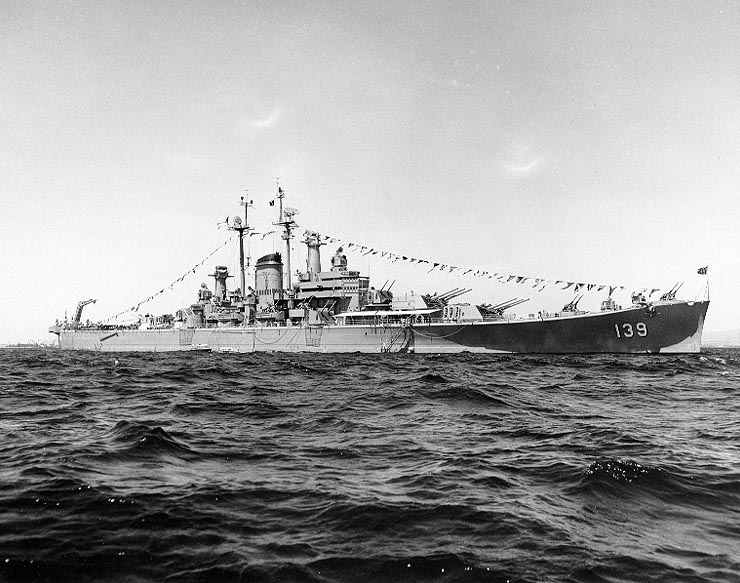
USS Salem

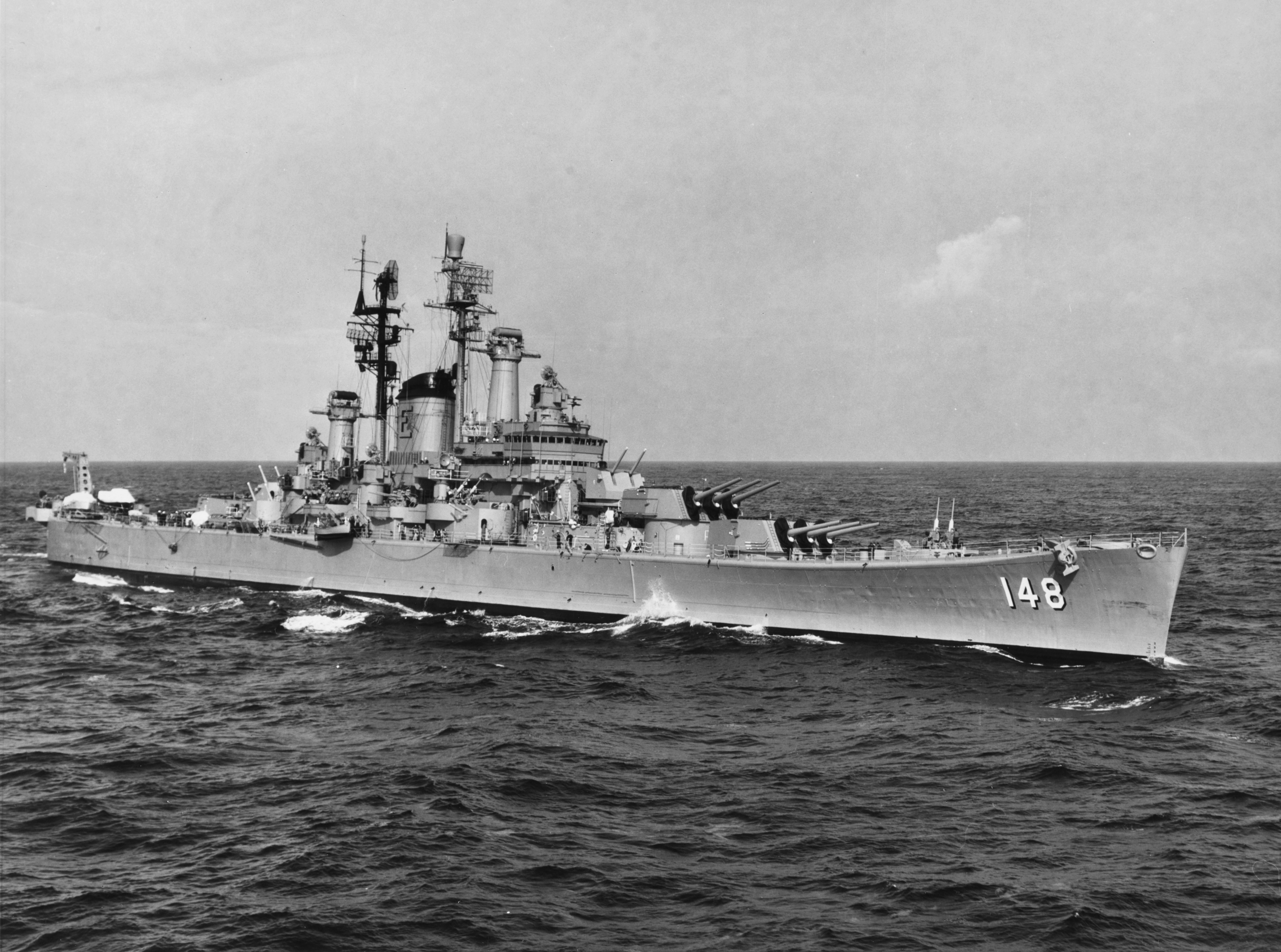
USS Newport News

== See also ==
- List of cruisers of the United States Navy

== Bibliography ==
- Andrews, George A., LCDR (March 2022). "Navy Department, Bureau of Ships, Design Branch, CA-139 Class Design History, 31 March 1945". Warship International. LIX (1): 20–33. ISSN 0043-0374.
- Friedman, Norman (1980). "United States of America". In Chesneau, Roger (ed.). Conway's All the World's Fighting Ships 1922–1946. New York: Mayflower Books. ISBN 0-8317-0303-2.
