= USS Hull (DD-945) =

Forrest Sherman class destroyer

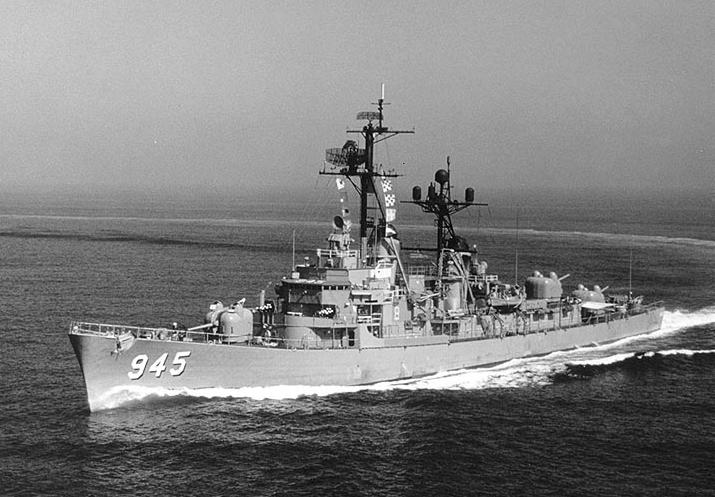
- USS Hull, 21 October 1971.

History

United States
- Namesake: Isaac Hull
- Builder: Bath Iron Works
- Laid down: 12 September 1956
- Launched: 10 August 1957
- Acquired: 25 June 1958
- Commissioned: 3 July 1958
- Decommissioned: 11 July 1983
- Stricken: 15 November 1983
- Fate: Sunk as a weapons test platform, 7 April 1998

General characteristics
- Class & type: Forrest Sherman-class destroyer
- Displacement: 2,800 tons standard.; 4,050 tons full load.
- Length: 407 ft (124 m) waterline, 418 ft (127 m) overall.
- Beam: 45 ft (14 m)
- Draft: 22 ft (6.7 m)
- Propulsion: 4 x 1,200 psi (8.3 MPa) Babcock & Wilcox boilers w/Bailey 'Iowa type' ACC, General Electric steam turbines; 70,000 shp (52 MW); 2 x shafts.
- Speed: 32.5 knots (60.2 km/h; 37.4 mph)
- Range: 4,500 nautical miles (8,300 km) at 20 knots (37 km/h)
- Complement: 15 officers, 218 enlisted.
- Armament: 3 × 5 in (127 mm) 54 calibre dual purpose Mk 42 guns; 4 × 3 in (76 mm) 50 calibre Mark 33 anti-aircraft guns; 2 × mark 10/11 Hedgehogs; 6 × 12.75 in (324 mm) Mark 32 torpedo tubes.

USS Hull (DD-945), named for Commodore Isaac Hull USN (1773 to 1843), was a Forrest Sherman-class destroyer built by the Bath Iron Works Corporation at Bath in Maine. Laid down on 12 September 1956 and launched 10 August 1957, by Mrs. Albert G. Mumma.

== History ==
She was commissioned 3 July 1958 and transited the Panama Canal a few months later to begin a long career with the Pacific Fleet. Between April and August 1959 Hull conducted the first of her fifteen deployments to serve with the Seventh Fleet in the Western Pacific. She made three more cruises in that area in 1960, 1961–1962 and 1963–1964. During October and November 1962 the destroyer escorted Pacific-based amphibious forces to the Panama Canal Zone as part of the US Navy's Cuban Missile Crisis operations. Hull's 1965 Seventh Fleet tour was the first of six Vietnam War deployments, during which she fired tens of thousands of five-inch shells in support of forces ashore and helped rescue several downed U.S. aviators. Additionally, Hull served as plane guard for carriers on Yankee Station in the Tonkin Gulf, participated in Operation Sea Dragon operations, and patrolled on search and rescue duties and carried out Naval Gunfire Support missions during the Vietnam War.

Hull made her eleventh WestPac cruise in 1973, after the direct U.S. role in the Vietnam War had ended.

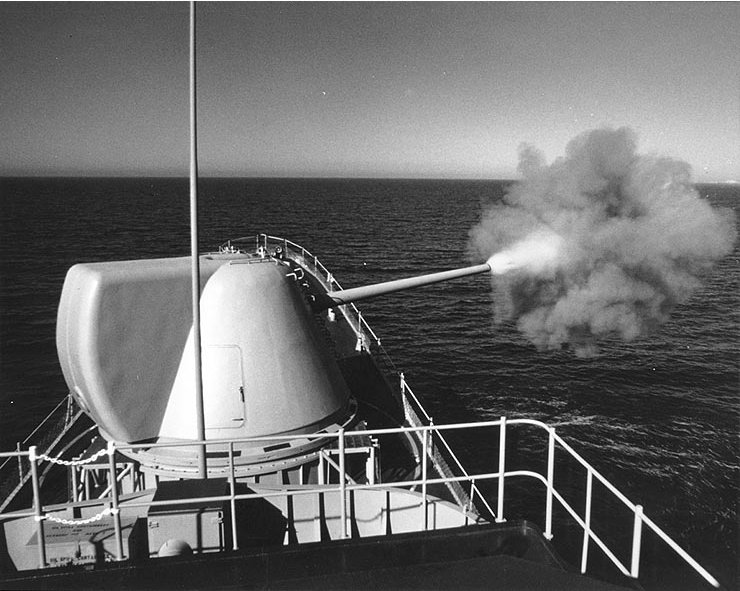
USS Hull test fired the new 8 inch/55 caliber MCLW gun off San Clemente Island, California, September 17, 1975

During her major overhaul in 1974–75, her forward 5 in/54 Mark 42 gun mount was replaced with an 8-inch/55-caliber Mark 71 gun mount. This Major Caliber Lightweight Gun ("MCLWG") was the result of a project dating back to the 1960s, when it was realized that heavy gunfire support for amphibious operations would die with the existing force of heavy cruisers unless a big gun could be developed for destroyer-size ships. A prototype gun and mounting had been built and tested ashore during the early 1970s. Hull was its test ship for seagoing trials, after which it was expected that several of these guns would be installed on board destroyers of the new Spruance class.

Hull's eight-inch gun began firing tests in April 1975. These lasted into the following year, and were reportedly successful. The ship carried the Mark 71 mounting during her 1976-77 and 1978 deployments to the Western Pacific, and conducted more firing tests during that time. However, the MCLWG project was cancelled in 1978. The prototype gun was removed from Hull during her 1979-80 overhaul and she spent the rest of her days with the three five-inch gun mounts that were typical of her class.

In February–September 1981 Hull served again in Asian waters. She began her final deployment in September 1982, steaming to the Western Pacific by way of Alaska, rescuing five Vietnamese refugees at sea in October and then moving further west to serve in the Indian Ocean and Arabian Sea as part of the battle group built around the nuclear-powered aircraft carrier Enterprise.

== Fate ==
Returning to the United States West Coast in April 1983, Hull immediately commenced inactivation preparations. She was decommissioned on 11 July 1983 and stricken on 15 October 1983. During a weapon and tactics test, she was sunk on 7 April 1998. The test was designed around a Harpoon missile fired from a Lockheed S-3B Viking, but many different weapons were used throughout the exercise. Her final resting place is 32°35′00.9″N 120°32′00.3″W at a depth of 2,096 fathoms (12,576 feet; 3,833 meters).
