= Battle of Inchon =

1950 battle of the Korean War

- Part of the Korean War
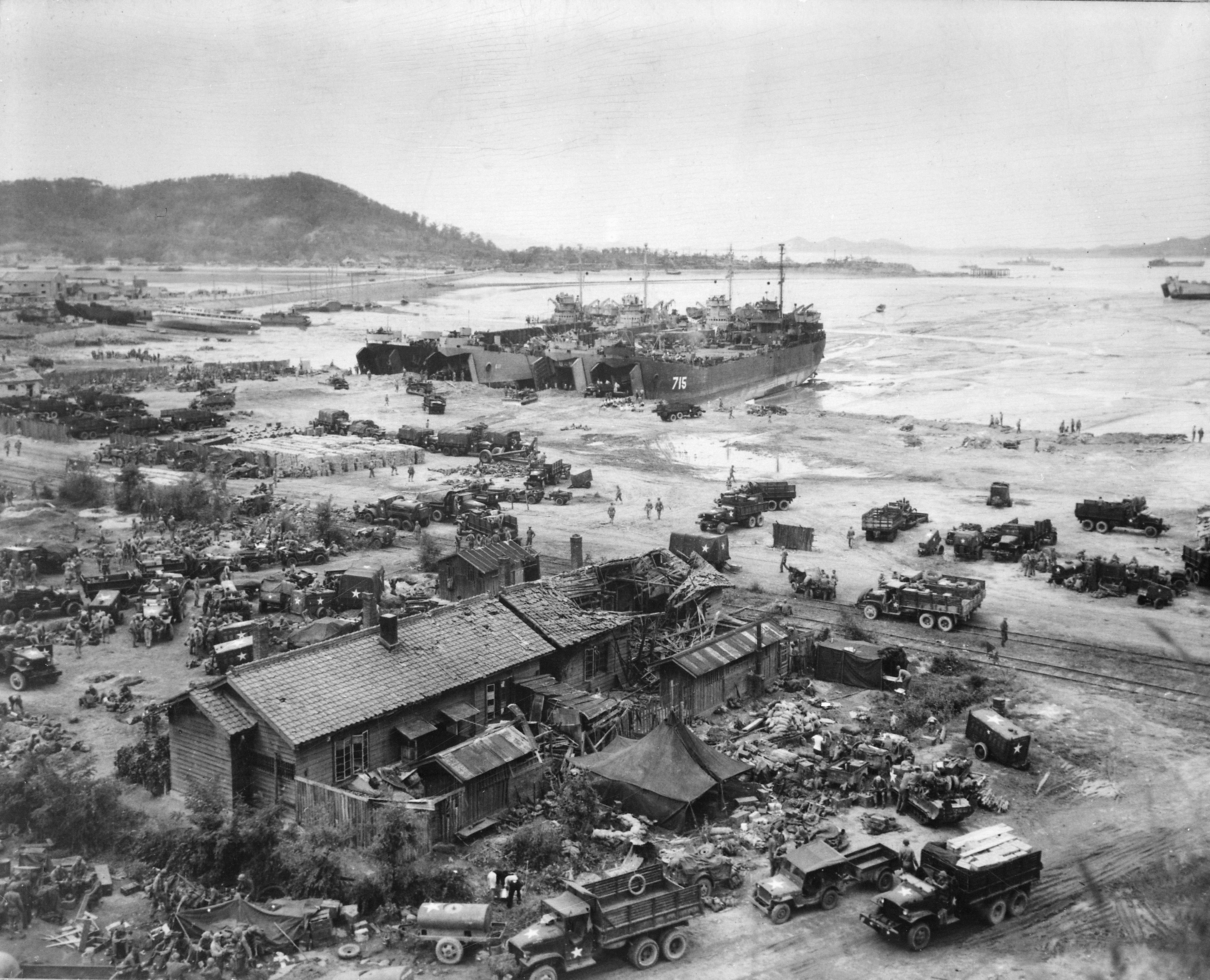
- Four tank landing ships unload men and equipment on Red Beach one day after the amphibious landings on Incheon.
Date	10–19 September 1950 (10–15 September – Bombardments of Wolmido and Incheon) (15–19 September – Incheon Landing)
Location	Incheon, South Korea and the Yellow Sea 37°28′34″N 126°36′10″E
Result	United Nations victory: Beginning of the North Korean withdrawal from South Korea; Start of the UN offensive into North Korea

Belligerents
South Korea; United Nations; United States; United Kingdom; Canada; Australia; New Zealand; France; Netherlands	North Korea

Commanders and leaders
Douglas MacArthur; Arthur Dewey Struble; Edward M. Almond; Oliver P. Smith; (South Korea) Sohn Won-yil; (South Korea) Shin Hyun-joon; (South Korea) Paik In-yeop	(North Korea) Kim Il Sung; (North Korea) Choe Yong-kun; (North Korea) Wol Ki Chan; (North Korea) Wan Yong

Units involved
X Corps: 7th Infantry Division; 1st Marine Division; various support units; ROK Army 17th Infantry Regiment (Note: Attached to the US Army 7th Infantry Division.); ROK Marine 1st Regiment (Note: Attached to the USMC 1st Marine Division.); ROK Police Hwarang Unit (Note: Attached to the US Army 7th Infantry Division and the USMC 1st Marine Division.); KATUSA (Note: Attached to the US Army 7th Infantry Division.); Student Volunteer Force of Koreans In Japan (Note: Attached to the US Army 7th Infantry Division.); Joint Task Force 7 (UN Combined Fleet)	226th Marine Regiment; 918th Artillery Regiment

Strength
About 40,000 infantry; 4 cruisers; 7 destroyers; About 260 ships of Joint Task Force 7: US (226 ships) South Korea (15 ships) UK (12 ships) Canada (3 ships) Australia (2 ships) New Zealand (2 ships) France (1 ship) Netherlands (1 ship)	About: 6,500 infantry; 19 aircraft; 1 fortress; 1 patrol boat; Unknown quantity of artillery

Casualties and losses
224 killed 809 wounded 2 cruisers damaged 3 destroyers damaged 1 LST lost and 3 damaged 1 aircraft destroyed	1,350 killed; 1 fortress damaged; 1 patrol boat sunk; 1 aircraft destroyed
- Location within Korea

The Battle of Inchon (Korean: 인천 상륙 작전; Hanja: 仁川上陸作戰; MR: Inch'ŏn sangnyuk chakchŏn), also called the Inchon landings, was an amphibious invasion and battle of the Korean War that resulted in a decisive victory and strategic reversal in favor of the United Nations Command. The operation involved some 75,000 troops and 261 naval vessels and led to the recapture of the South Korean capital of Seoul two weeks later. The code name for the Incheon operation was Operation Chromite.

The battle began on 15 September 1950 and ended on 19 September. Through a surprise amphibious assault far from the Pusan Perimeter that UN and Republic of Korea Army (ROK) forces were desperately defending, the largely undefended city of Incheon was secured after bombardment from UN forces. The battle ended a string of victories by the North Korean Korean People's Army (KPA). The subsequent UN recapture of Seoul partially severed the KPA's supply lines in South Korea.

The UN and ROK forces were commanded by General of the Army Douglas MacArthur of the United States Army. MacArthur was the driving force behind the operation, overcoming the strong misgivings of more cautious generals to a risky assault over extremely unfavorable terrain. The battle was followed by a rapid collapse of the KPA; within a month of the Incheon landing, the Americans had taken 135,000 KPA troops prisoner.

== Background ==
=== Pusan Perimeter ===
From the outbreak of the Korean War following the invasion of South Korea by North Korea on 25 June 1950, the KPA had enjoyed superiority in both manpower and ground combat equipment over the ROK and UN forces dispatched to South Korea to prevent it from collapsing. The North Korean strategy was to aggressively pursue UN and ROK forces on all avenues of approach south and to engage them, attacking from the front and initiating a double envelopment of both flanks of the defending units, which allowed the KPA to surround and cut off the opposing force, forcing it to retreat in disarray.

From their initial 25 June offensive to fighting in July and early August, the KPA used this tactic to defeat the UN forces they encountered and push southward. However, with the establishment of the Pusan Perimeter in August, UN forces held a continuous line which the KPA could not flank. The KPA advantages in numbers decreased daily as the superior UN logistical system brought in more troops and supplies to the UN forces.

When the KPA approached the Pusan Perimeter on 5 August, they attempted the same frontal assault technique on the four main avenues of approach into the perimeter. Throughout August, they conducted direct assaults resulting in the Battle of Masan, the Battle of Battle Mountain, the First Battle of Naktong Bulge, the Battle of Taegu, and the Battle of the Bowling Alley. On the east coast of the Korean Peninsula, the ROK repulsed three KPA divisions at the Battle of P'ohang-dong. The KPA attacks stalled as UN forces repelled the attack. All along the front, the KPA reeled from these defeats, the first time in the war North Korean tactics had failed.

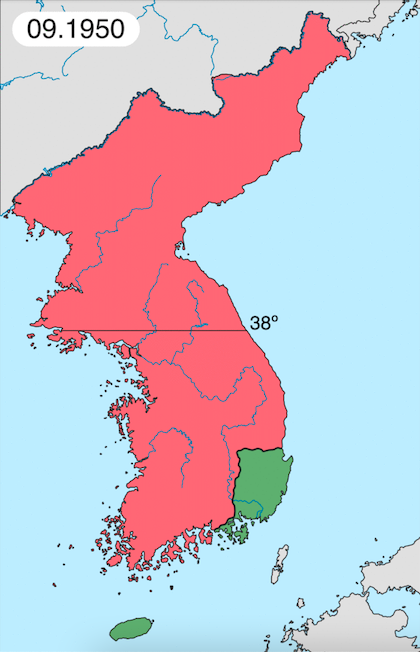
The state of the Korean War in September 1950, before the Battle of Incheon

By the end of August the KPA had been pushed beyond their limits and many of the original units were at far reduced strength and effectiveness. Logistic problems wracked the KPA, and shortages of food, weapons, equipment and replacement soldiers proved devastating for their units. However, the KPA retained high morale and enough supply to allow for another large-scale offensive. On 1 September the KPA threw their entire military into one final bid to break the Pusan Perimeter, the Great Naktong Offensive, a five-pronged simultaneous attack across the entire perimeter.

The attack caught UN forces by surprise and almost overwhelmed them. KPA troops attacked Kyongju, surrounded Taegu and Ka-san, recrossed the Naktong Bulge, threatened Yongsan, and continued their attack at Masan, focusing on Nam River and Haman. However, despite their efforts, in one of the most brutal fights of the Korean War, the KPA were unsuccessful. Unable to hold their gains, the KPA retreated from the offensive a much weaker force, and vulnerable to counterattack.

=== Planning ===
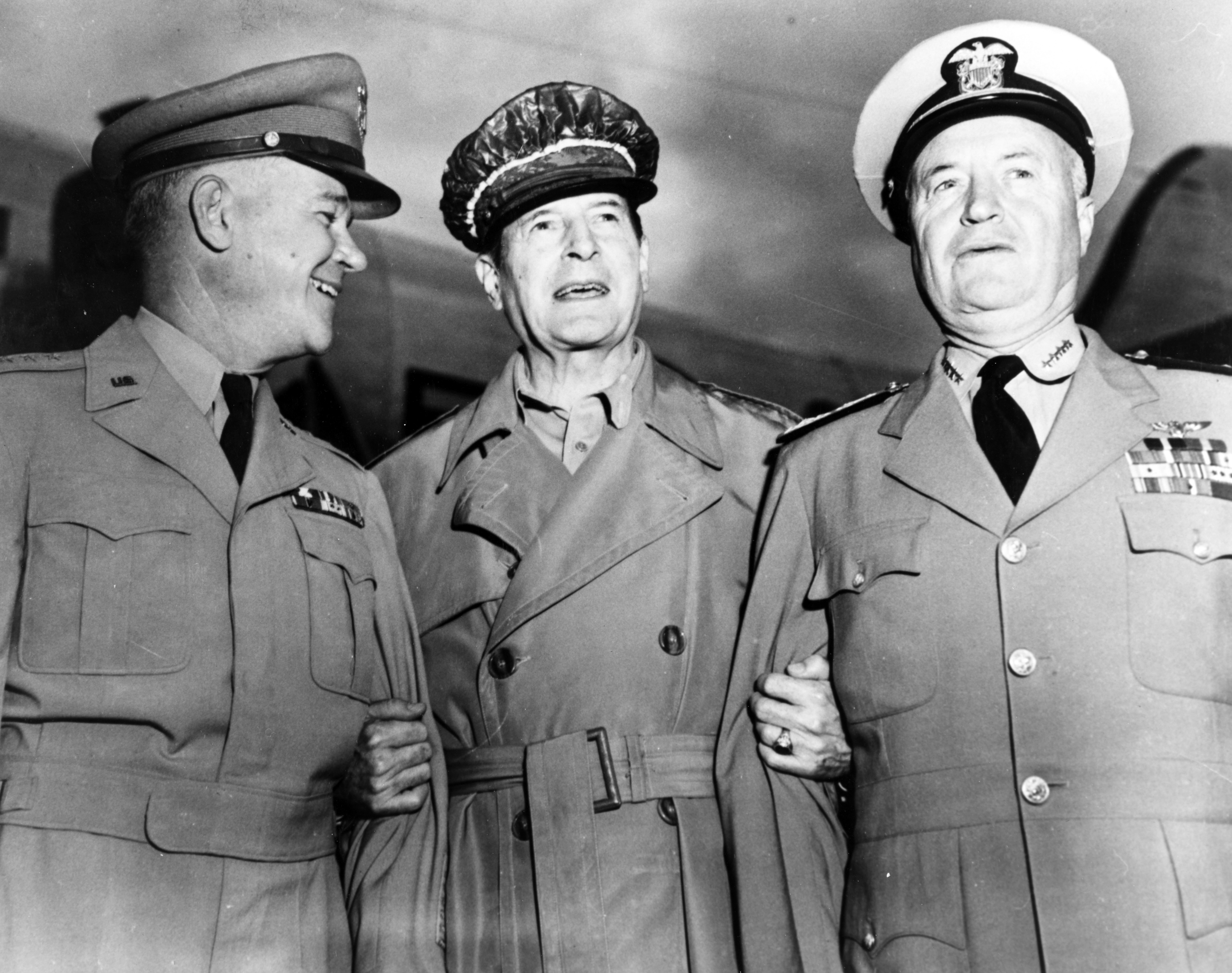
General of the Army Douglas MacArthur (center) grasps General J. Lawton Collins (the Army Chief of Staff, left) and Admiral Forrest Sherman (the Chief of Naval Operations, right) upon their arrival in Tokyo, Japan. MacArthur used their meeting to convince other military leaders that the assault on Incheon was necessary.

Days after the beginning of the war, General of the Army Douglas MacArthur, the US Army officer in command of all UN forces in Korea, envisioned an amphibious assault to retake the Seoul area. The city had fallen in the first days of the war in the First Battle of Seoul. MacArthur later wrote that he thought the KPA would push the ROK back far past Seoul. He also said he decided days after the war began that the battered, demoralized, and under-equipped ROK, many of whom did not support the South Korean government put in power by the United States, could not hold off the KPA even with American support.

MacArthur felt that he could turn the tide if he made a decisive troop movement behind KPA lines, and preferred Incheon, over Chumunjin-up or Kunsan as the landing site. He had originally envisioned such a landing, code-named Operation Bluehearts, for 22 July, with the US Army's 1st Cavalry Division landing at Incheon. However, by 10 July the plan was abandoned as it was clear the 1st Cavalry Division would be needed on the Pusan Perimeter. On 23 July, MacArthur formulated a new plan, code-named Operation Chromite, calling for an amphibious assault by the US Army's 2nd Infantry Division and the United States Marine Corps (USMC)'s 5th Marine Regiment in mid-September 1950. This, too fell through as both units were moved to the Pusan Perimeter. MacArthur decided instead to use the US Army's 7th Infantry Division, his last reserve unit in East Asia, to conduct the operation as soon as it could be raised to wartime strength.

In preparation for the invasion, MacArthur activated the US Army's X Corps to act as the command for the landing forces, and appointed Major General Edward Almond, his chief of staff, as Corps' commander, anticipating the operation would bring a quick end to the war. Throughout August, MacArthur faced the challenge of re-equipping the 7th Infantry Division as it had sent 9,000 of its men to reinforce the Pusan Perimeter and was greatly understrength.

He also faced the challenge that the USMC, reduced in size following World War II, had to rebuild the 1st Marine Division, using elements of the 1st Provisional Marine Brigade fighting at Pusan as well as the 1st Marine Regiment and the 7th Marine Regiment, which pulled US Marines from as far away as the Mediterranean Sea to Korea for the task. MacArthur ordered Korean Augmentation To the United States Army (KATUSA) troops, ROK conscripts assigned to US Army units, to reinforce the 7th Infantry Division, while allocating all equipment coming into Korea to X Corps, despite it being crucially needed by the US Army's Eighth Army on the Pusan Perimeter.

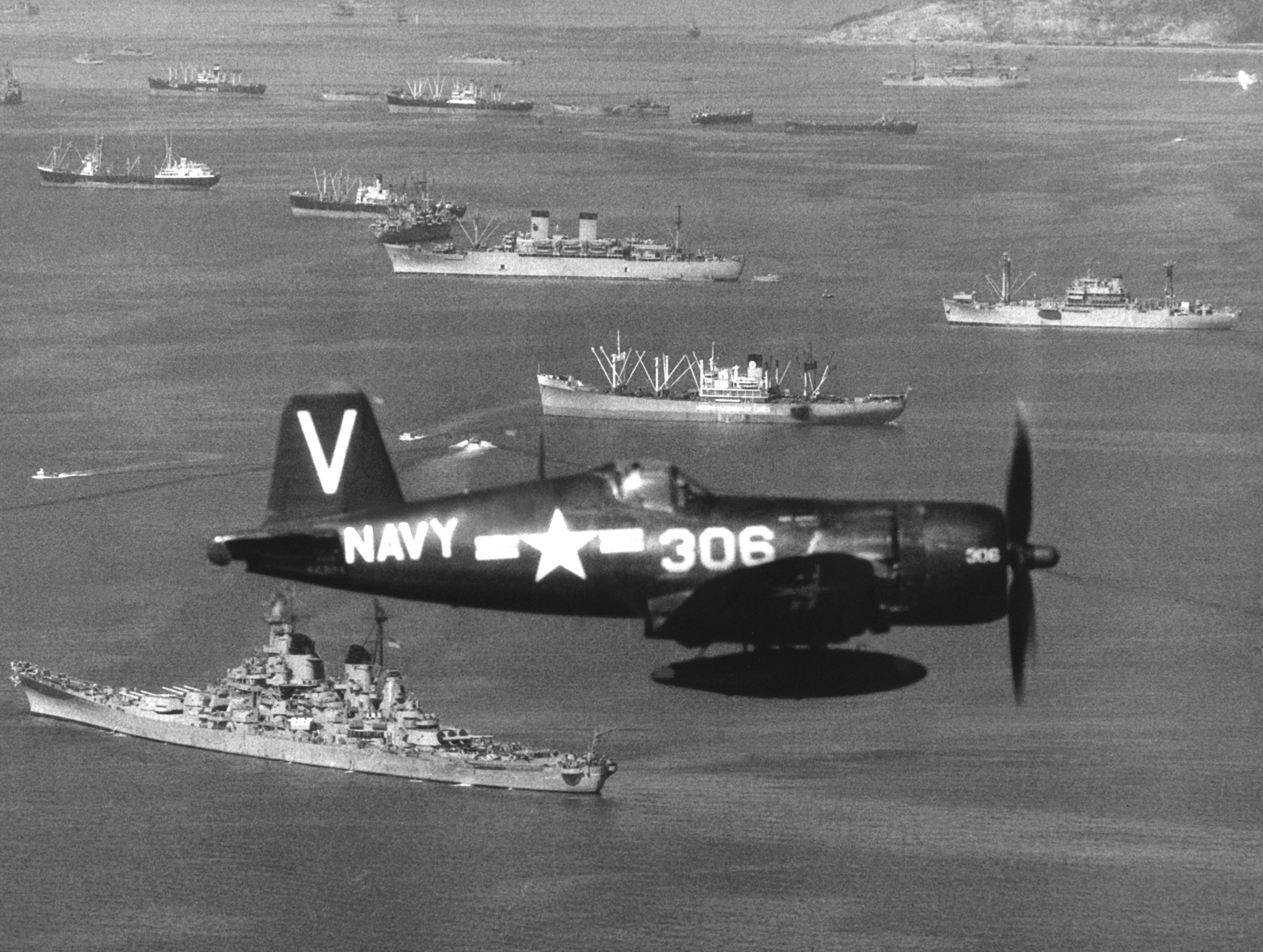
A Vought F4U-4B Corsair of Fighter Squadron 113 (VF-113) (the "Stingers") flies over UN ships off Incheon, Korea, on 15 September 1950. VF-113 was assigned to Carrier Air Group Eleven (CVG-11) aboard the aircraft carrier USS Philippine Sea. The battleship USS Missouri is visible below the Corsair.

MacArthur decided to use the Joint Strategic and Operations Group (JSPOG) of his United States Far East Command (FECOM). The initial plan was met with skepticism by the other generals because Incheon's natural and artificial defenses were formidable. The approaches to Incheon were two restricted passages, which could be easily blocked by naval mines. The current of the channels was also dangerously quick—3 to 8 knots (3.5 to 9.2 mph; 5.6 to 14.8 km/h)—and tides were so extreme as to prevent immediate follow-on landings. The anchorage was small and the harbor was surrounded by tall seawalls. United States Navy Commander Arlie G. Capps noted that the harbor had "every natural and geographic handicap." US Navy leaders favored a landing at Kunsan, closer to the Pusan perimeter and the KPA main axis of supply through Taejon, but MacArthur did not think landing there would produce a sufficiently decisive victory. He also felt that the KPA, who also thought the conditions of the Incheon channel would make a landing impossible, would be surprised and caught off-guard by the attack.

On 23 August, the commanders held a meeting at MacArthur's headquarters in Tokyo. Chief of Staff of the United States Army General Joseph Lawton Collins, Chief of Naval Operations Admiral Forrest Sherman, and United States Air Force (USAF) operations deputy Lieutenant General Idwal H. Edward all flew from Washington, D.C., to Japan to take part in the briefing; Chief of Staff of the United States Air Force General Hoyt Vandenberg did not attend, possibly because he "did not want to legitimize an operation that essentially belong[ed] to the Navy and the Marines." The Marine Corps staff, who were to be responsible for leading the landing at Incheon, were not invited, which became a contentious issue. During the briefing, nine members of the staff of US Navy Admiral James H. Doyle spoke for nearly 90 minutes on every technical and military aspect of the landing. MacArthur told the officers that although a landing at Kunsan would bring a relatively easy linkup with the Eighth Army, it "would be an attempted envelopment that would not envelop" and would place more troops in a vulnerable pocket of the Pusan Perimeter. MacArthur won over Sherman by speaking of his affection for the US Navy and relating the story of how the Navy carried him out of Corregidor to safety in 1942 during World War II. Sherman agreed to support the Incheon operation, leaving Doyle furious.

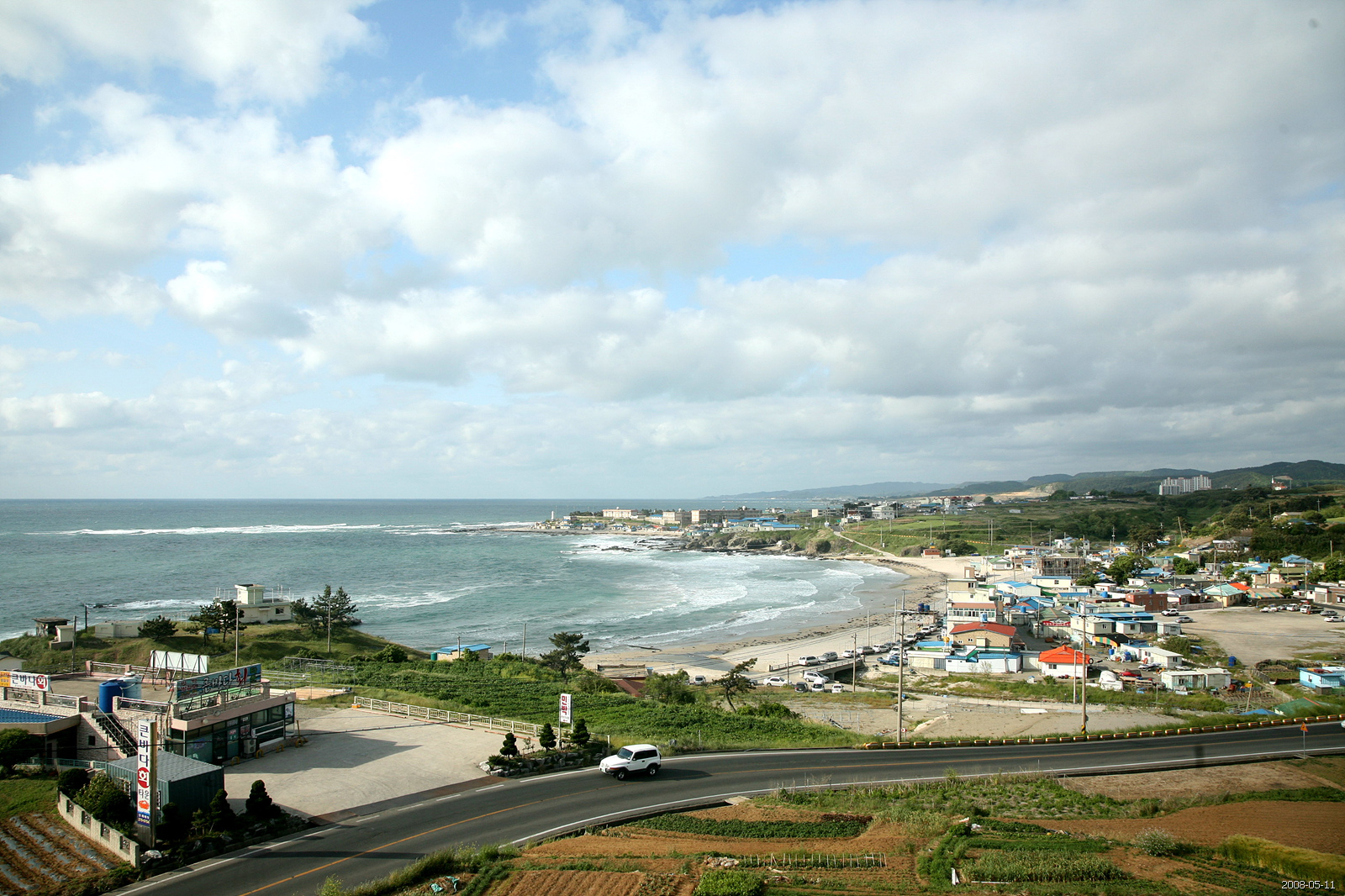
The beach of Pohang in 2008. Here, UN forces landed unopposed in 1950

MacArthur spent 45 minutes after the briefing explaining his reasons for choosing Incheon. He said that, because it was so heavily defended, the North Koreans would not expect an attack there, that victory at Incheon would avoid a brutal winter campaign, and that, by invading a northern strong point, UN forces could cut off KPA lines of supply and communication. Sherman and Collins returned to Washington, D.C., and reported back to Secretary of Defense Louis A. Johnson. The Joint Chiefs of Staff approved MacArthur's plan on 28 August. President Truman also provided his approval.

The landing at Incheon was not the first large-scale amphibious operation since World War II. That distinction belonged to the United Nations landing that took place on 18 July 1950 at Pohang, South Korea. However, that operation was not made in KPA-held territory and was unopposed.

Admiral Arthur Dewey Struble's Joint Task Force 7 consisted of Fast Carrier Task Force 77 for fighter cover, interdiction, and ground attack; Royal Navy Admiral William Andrewes' Task Force 91 for blockade and covering force; Rear Admiral George R. Henderson's Task Force 99 for patrol and reconnaissance; Captain Bernard L. Austin's Service Squadron 3, operating Task Force 79 for logistics support; Admiral James H. Doyle's Invasion Force - Attack Task Force 90; and the Military Sea Transportation Service, which was to bring in the United States Army's 7th Infantry Division on 18 September 1950.

Wolmi Do, states Robert Heinl, was the tactical key to Incheon. "Its peak commands the harbor and the city. General Smith's planners, recognizing Wolmi Do's importance, quickly concluded that the island - which must be captured first - should be taken with a separate landing on the morning tide, and that the main landings at Incheon proper could then proceed in the evening."

== Prelude ==
Before the main land battle, UN forces landed spies in Incheon and bombarded the city's defenses via air and sea. Deception operations were also carried out to draw North Korean attention away from Incheon.

=== Maintaining surprise ===
On June 27, 1950, in the Dogfight over Incheon, the US Air Force shot down a North Korean plane over Incheon.

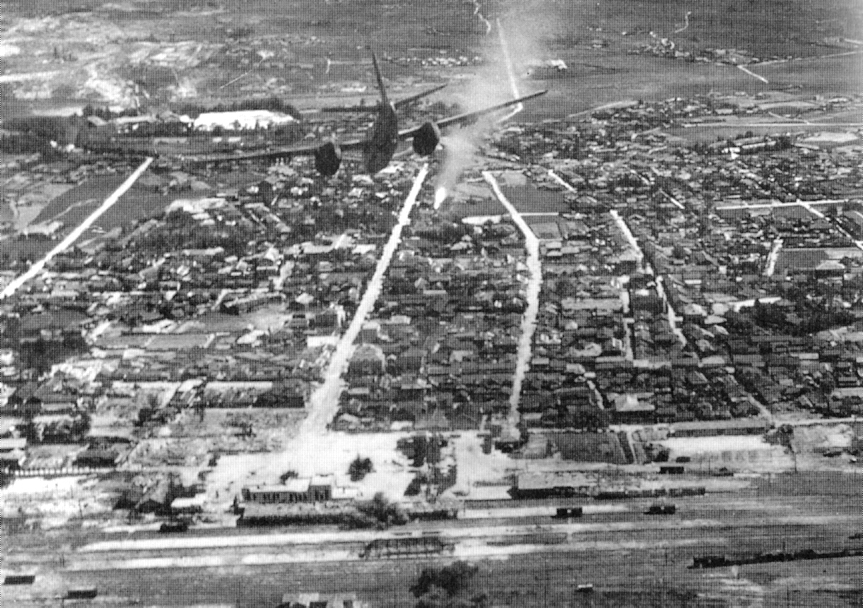
A United States Air Force 3rd Bombardment Group (Light) A-26 Invader conducts a rocket attack on the rail yard at Iri, South Korea, in early September 1950 as part of deception operations to draw North Korean attention away from the planned Incheon landings.

With men, supplies, and ships obviously concentrating at Pusan and in Japanese ports for a major amphibious operation and the press in Japan referring to the upcoming landings as "Operation Common Knowledge," the UN command feared that it would fail to achieve surprise in the Incheon landings. Exacerbating this fear, the leader of a North Korean-Japanese spy ring arrested in Japan in early September 1950 had a copy of the plan for Operation Chromite, and the UN forces did not know whether he had managed to transmit the plan to North Korea before his arrest. US Navy patrol aircraft, surface warships, and submarines operated in the Sea of Japan (East Sea) and the Yellow Sea to detect any reaction by North Korean, Soviet, or People's Republic of China military forces, and on 4 September 1950 F4U Corsair fighters of Fighter Squadron 53 (VF-53) operating from the aircraft carrier USS Valley Forge shot down a Soviet Air Force A-20 Havoc bomber after it opened fire on them over the Yellow Sea as it flew toward the UN naval task force there.

In order to ensure surprise during the landings, UN forces staged an elaborate deception operation to draw North Korean attention away from Incheon by making it appear that the landing would take place 105 miles (169 km) to the south at Kunsan. On 5 September 1950, aircraft of the USAF's Far East Air Forces began attacks on roads and bridges to isolate Kunsan, typical of the kind of raids expected prior to an invasion there. A naval bombardment of Kunsan followed on 6 September, and on 11 September USAF B-29 Superfortress bombers joined the aerial campaign, bombing military installations in the area.

In addition to aerial and naval bombardment, UN forces took other measures to focus North Korean attention on Kunsan. On the docks at Pusan, USMC officers briefed their men on an upcoming landing at Kunsan within earshot of many Koreans, and on the night of 12–13 September 1950 the Royal Navy frigate HMS Whitesand Bay landed US Army special operations troops and Royal Marine Commandos on the docks at Kunsan, making sure that North Korean forces noticed their visit.

UN forces conducted a series of drills, tests, and raids elsewhere on the coast of Korea, where conditions were similar to Incheon, before the actual invasion. These drills were used to perfect the timing and performance of the landing craft, but also were intended to confuse the North Koreans further as to the location of the invasion.

=== Incheon infiltration ===
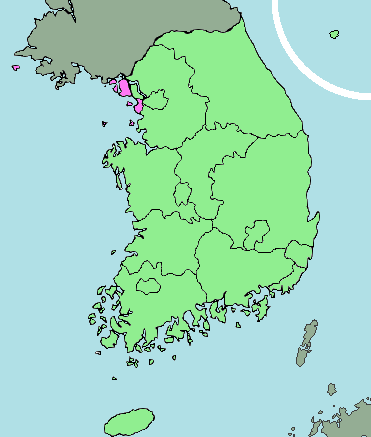
Incheon, South Korea, in pink coloring.

On 17 August 1950, a ROK Navy intelligence unit infiltrated the islands of Yonghung-do and Tokchok-do as part of Operation X-ray, and obtained information on the conditions there until 14 September.

Separately on 1 September 1950, a UN reconnaissance team (with members from US military intelligence units including the KLO and CIA) also infiltrated in Yonghung-do to obtain information on the conditions there.

The team, led by US Navy Lieutenant Eugene F. Clark, landed at Yonghung-do, an island in the mouth of the harbor. From there, the team relayed intelligence back to the UN Command. With the help of locals, Clark gathered information about tides, beach composition, mudflats, and seawalls. A separate reconnaissance mission codenamed Operation Trudy Jackson, which dispatched Youn Joung (former ROK Navy Lieutenant) and Ke In-ju (former ROK Army Colonel) to Incheon to collect further intelligence on the area, was mounted by the US military.

The tides at Incheon have an average range of 29 feet (8.8 m) and a maximum observed range of 36 feet (11 m), making the tidal range there one of the largest in the world and the littoral maximum in all of Asia. Clark observed the tides at Incheon for two weeks and discovered that American tidal charts were inaccurate, but that Japanese charts were quite good. Clark's team provided detailed reports on KPA artillery positions and fortifications on the island of Wolmi-do, at Incheon and on nearby islands. During the extended periods of low tide, Clark's team located and removed some North Korean naval mines, but, critically to the future success of the invasion, Clark reported that the North Koreans had not in fact systematically mined the channels.

When the KPA discovered that the agents had landed on the islands near Incheon, they made multiple attacks, including an attempted raid on Yonghung-do with six junks. Clark mounted a machine gun on a sampan and sank the attacking junks. In response, the KPA killed perhaps as many as 50 civilians for helping Clark.

=== Bombardments of Wolmi-do and Incheon ===
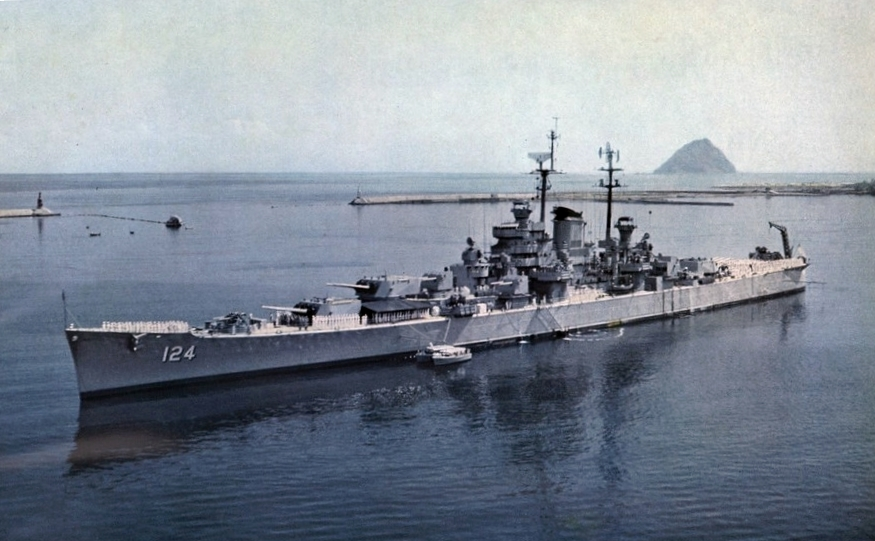
USS Rochester in 1956. She was the flagship of Vice Admiral Arthur D. Struble off Incheon in 1950.

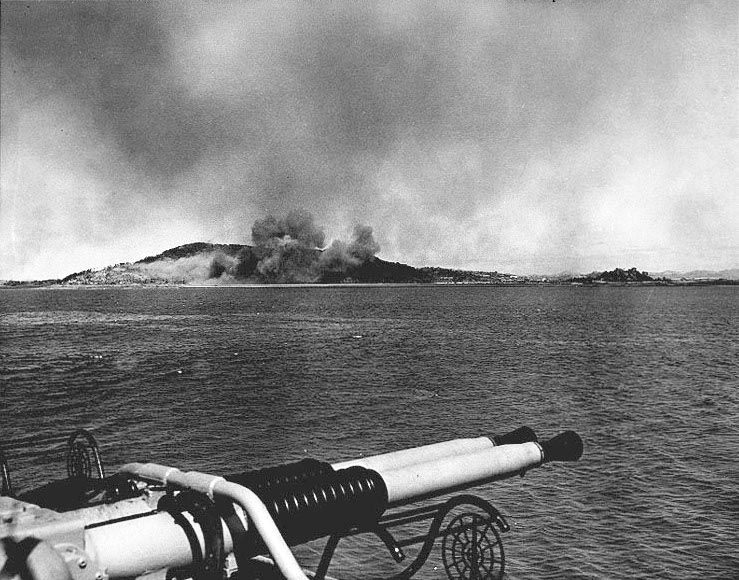
Wolmido under bombardment on 13 September 1950, two days before the landings, seen from the U.S. Navy destroyer USS Lyman K. Swenson.

On 10 September 1950, five days before the Incheon landing, 43 American warplanes flew over Wolmi-do, dropping 93 napalm canisters to "burn out" its eastern slope in an attempt to clear the way for American troops.

The flotilla of ships that landed and supported the amphibious force during the battle was commanded by Vice Admiral Arthur D. Struble, an expert in amphibious warfare. Struble had participated in amphibious operations in World War II, including the Normandy landings and the Battle of Leyte. He got underway for Incheon in his flagship, the heavy cruiser USS Rochester, on 12 September 1950. Among his ships were the Gunfire Support Group, consisting of Rochester, the heavy cruiser USS Toledo, the British light cruisers HMS Jamaica and HMS Kenya, and the six US destroyers of Task Element 90.62, made up of USS Collett, USS De Haven, USS Gurke, USS Henderson, USS Lyman K. Swenson, and USS Mansfield. Royal Canadian Navy destroyers HMCS Cayuga, HMCS Athabaskan and HMCS Sioux also participated in the invasion task force.

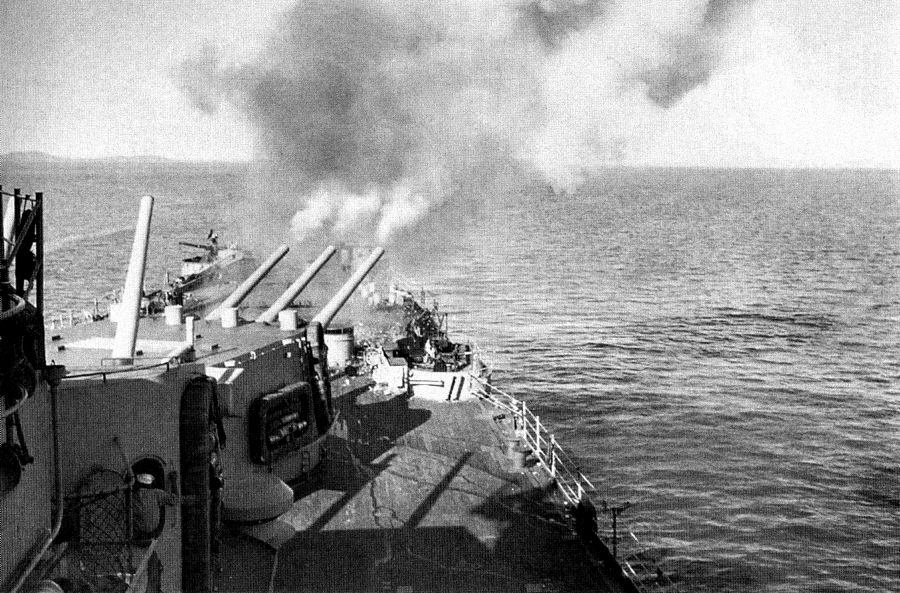
The aft turret of the U.S. Navy heavy cruiser USS Toledo fires its 8-inch (203-mm) guns during the pre-invasion bombardment.

At 07:00 on 13 September, the U.S. Navy's Destroyer Squadron 9, headed by Mansfield, steamed up Flying Fish Channel and into Incheon Harbor, where it fired upon KPA gun emplacements on Wolmi-do and in Incheon. Between them, two British cruisers and six American destroyers fired almost a thousand 5-inch (127-mm) and 6-inch (152-mm) shells onto the fortifications. The attacks tipped off the KPA that a landing might be imminent, and the KPA officer in command on Wolmi-do assured his superiors that he would throw their enemies back into the sea. North Korea's 918th Coastal Artillery Regiment returned fire, hitting Collett seven times, Gurke three times, and Lyman K. Swenson twice. Aboard Lyman K. Swenson, Lieutenant (junior grade) David H. Swenson was killed and eight others were wounded.

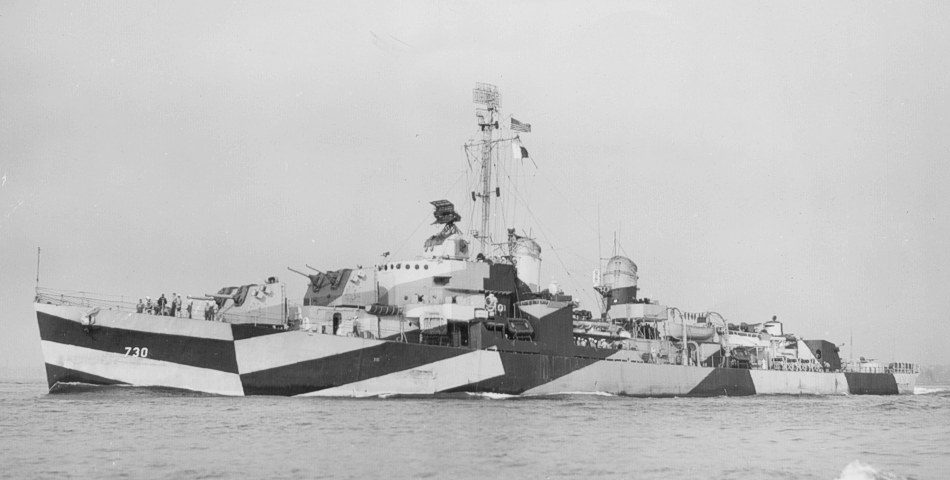
The US Navy destroyer USS Collett, photographed above in May 1944 while painted in dazzle camouflage, was among the ships damaged during the Wolmi-do bombardment.

The American destroyers withdrew after bombarding Wolmi-do for an hour and Rochester, Toledo, Jamaica, and Kenya proceeded to bombard the KPA batteries for the next three hours from the south of the island. Lieutenant Clark and his South Korean squad watched from hills south of Incheon, plotting locations where KPA machine guns were firing at the flotilla. They relayed this information to the invasion force via Japan in the afternoon.

During the night of 13–14 September, Struble decided on another day of bombardment, and the destroyers moved back up the channel off Wolmi-do on 14 September. They and the cruisers bombarded the island again that day, and planes from the carrier task force bombed and strafed it.

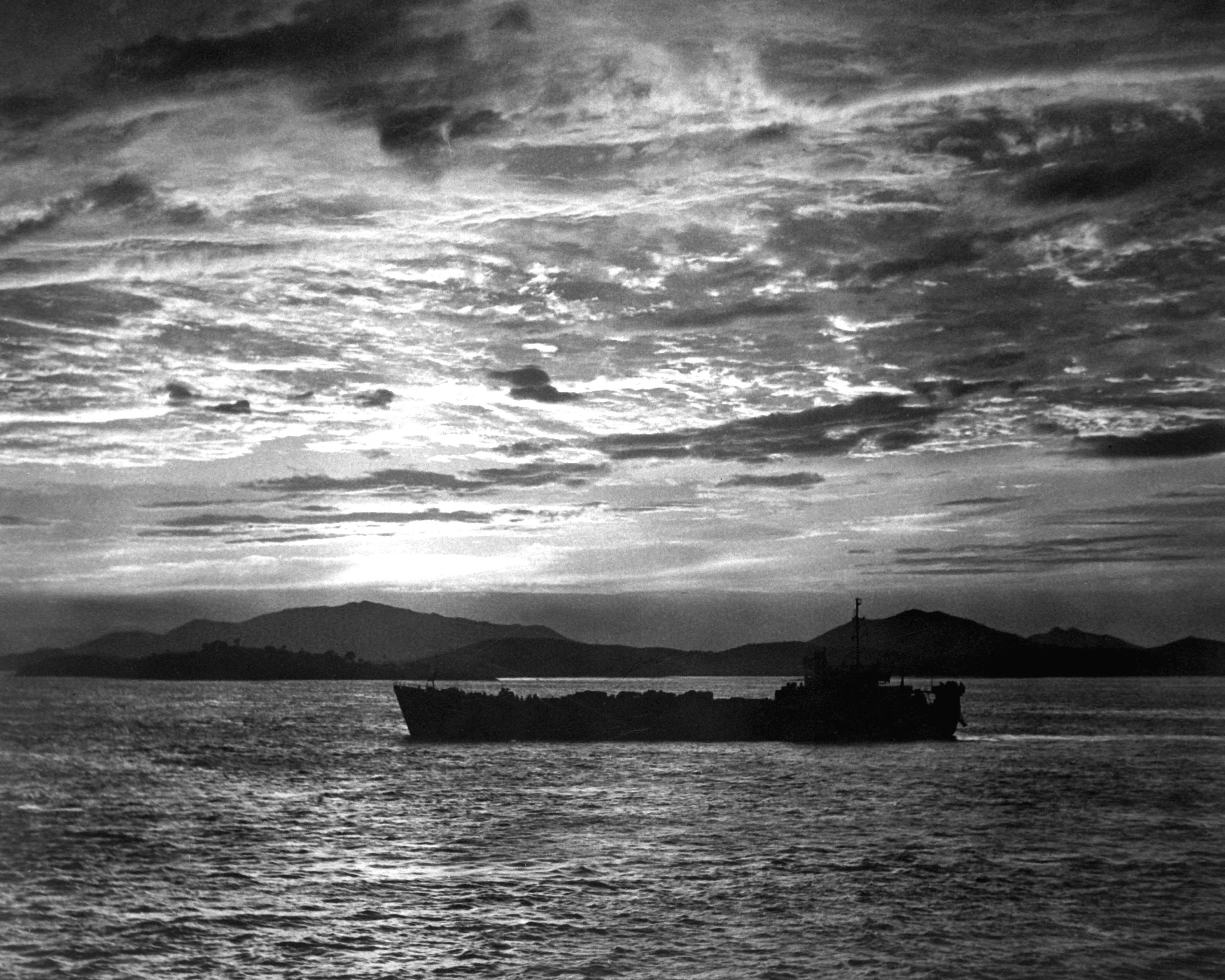
A tank landing ship enters the harbor at Incheon before the landings.

At 00:50 on 15 September 1950, Lieutenant Clark and his South Korean squad activated the lighthouse on the island of Palmido. Later that morning, the ships carrying the amphibious force followed the destroyers toward Incheon and entered Flying Fish Channel, and the US Marines of the invasion force got ready to make the first landings on Wolmi-do.

=== Naval mine clearance ===
Within weeks of the outbreak of the Korean War, the Soviet Union had shipped naval mines to North Korea for use in coastal defense, with Soviet naval mine warfare experts providing technical instruction in laying and employment of the mines to North Korean personnel. Some of the mines were shipped to Incheon. The UN forces did not become aware of the presence of mines in North Korean waters until early September 1950, raising fears that this would interfere with the Incheon invasion. It was too late to reschedule the landings, but the North Koreans laid relatively few and unsophisticated mines at Incheon. Destroyers in the assault force visually identified moored contact mines in the channel at low tide and destroyed them with gunfire. When the invasion force passed through the channel at high tide to land on the assault beaches, it passed over any remaining mines without incident.

== Battle ==
The landing at Incheon

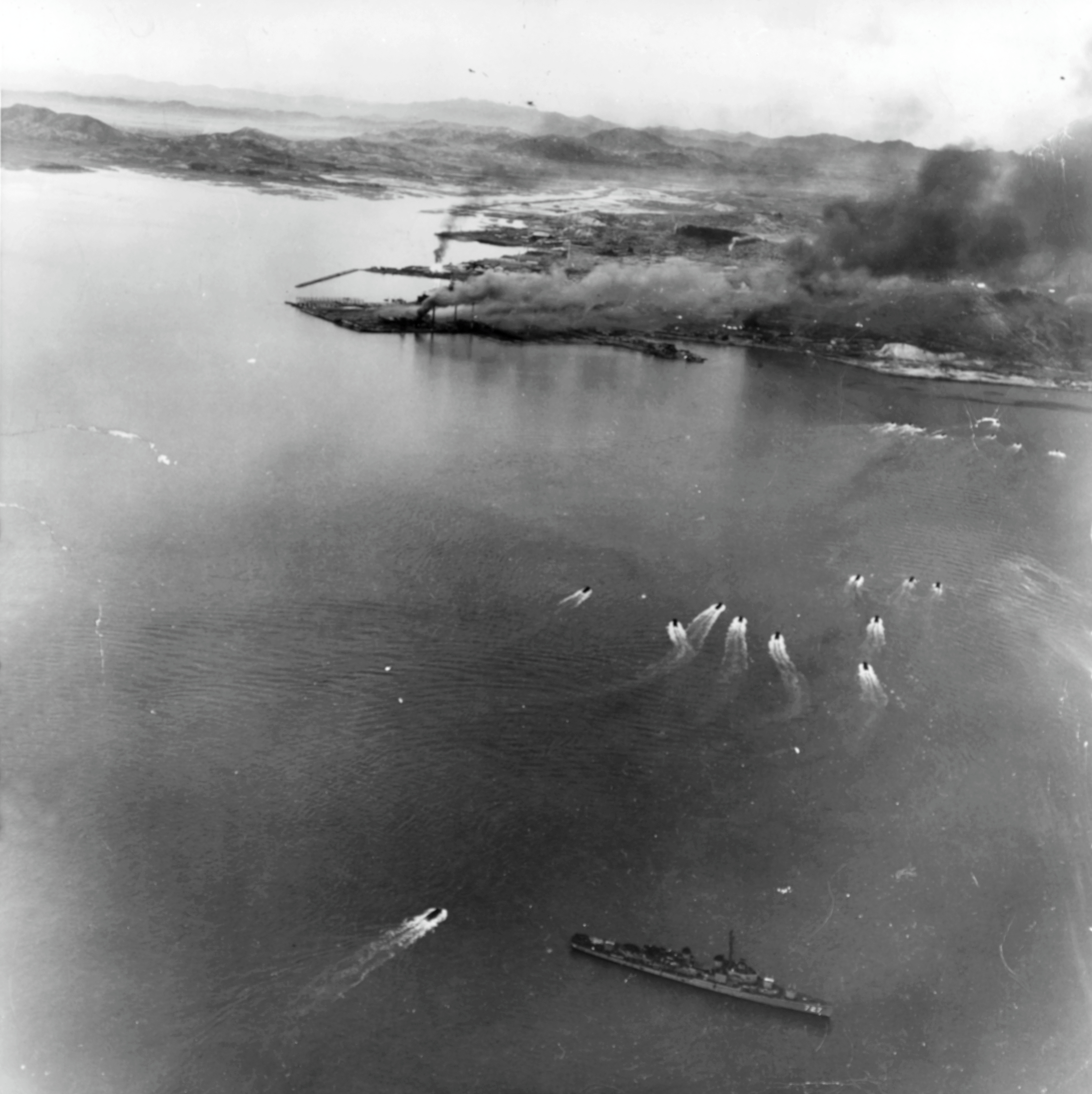
Landing craft of the first and second waves approach Red Beach on 15 September 1950. The U.S. Navy destroyer USS De Haven, visible at bottom center, covers them

=== Green Beach ===
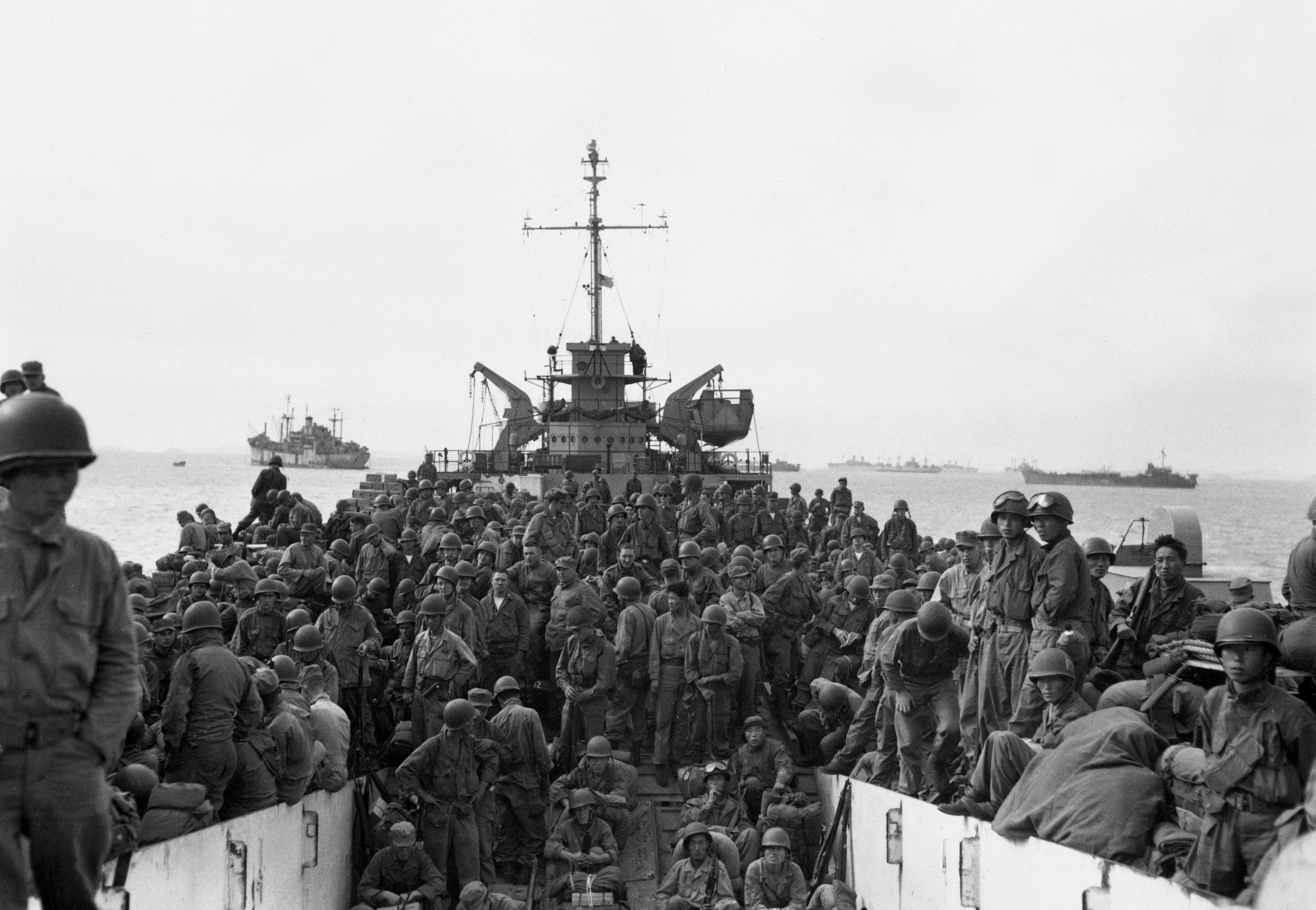
The 31st Infantry lands at Incheon

At 06:30 on 15 September 1950, the lead elements of X Corps hit "Green Beach" on the northern side of Wolmido. The landing force consisted of the 3rd Battalion, 5th Marines, led by Lieutenant Colonel Robert Taplett and nine M26 Pershing tanks from the USMC 1st Tank Battalion. One tank was equipped with a flamethrower and two others had bulldozer blades. The battle group landed from LCVPs and LSUs. The entire island was captured by noon at the cost of just 14 casualties.

The KPA defenders were outnumbered by more than six to one by the UN troops. KPA casualties included over 200 killed and 136 captured, primarily from the 918th Artillery Regiment and the 226th Independent Marine Regiment. The North Koreans had not been expecting an invasion at Incheon.

According to Heinl, "With the capture of So Wolmi Do at 1115, the 3d Battalion, 5th Marines had accomplished its mission. Now, all they had to do was wait for the tide to rise again."

The KPA 22nd Infantry Regiment had moved to Incheon before dawn on 15 September, but retreated to Seoul after the main landing that evening. According to Heinl, "The 70th Regiment was ordered to Seoul from Suwon and, even more important, the 18th Division, which had been headed for the Naktong, was immediately recalled to the capital. The 22nd Regiment and the remnants of the 918th Coast Artillery could only await the impending blow."

=== Red Beach ===
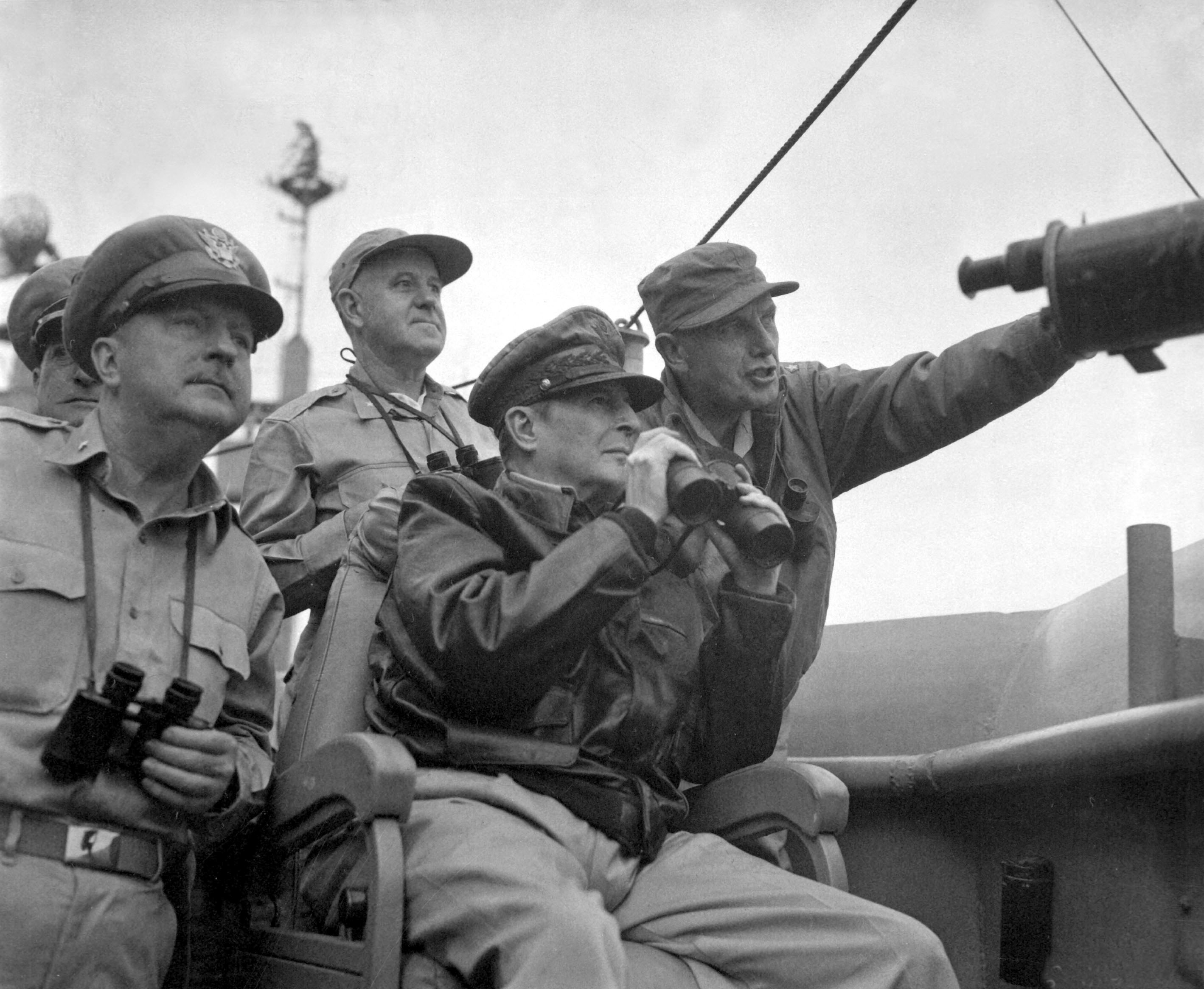
General Douglas MacArthur (center), commander in chief of United Nations Forces, observes the shelling of lightly defended Incheon from the U.S. Navy amphibious force command ship USS Mount McKinley on 15 September 1950.

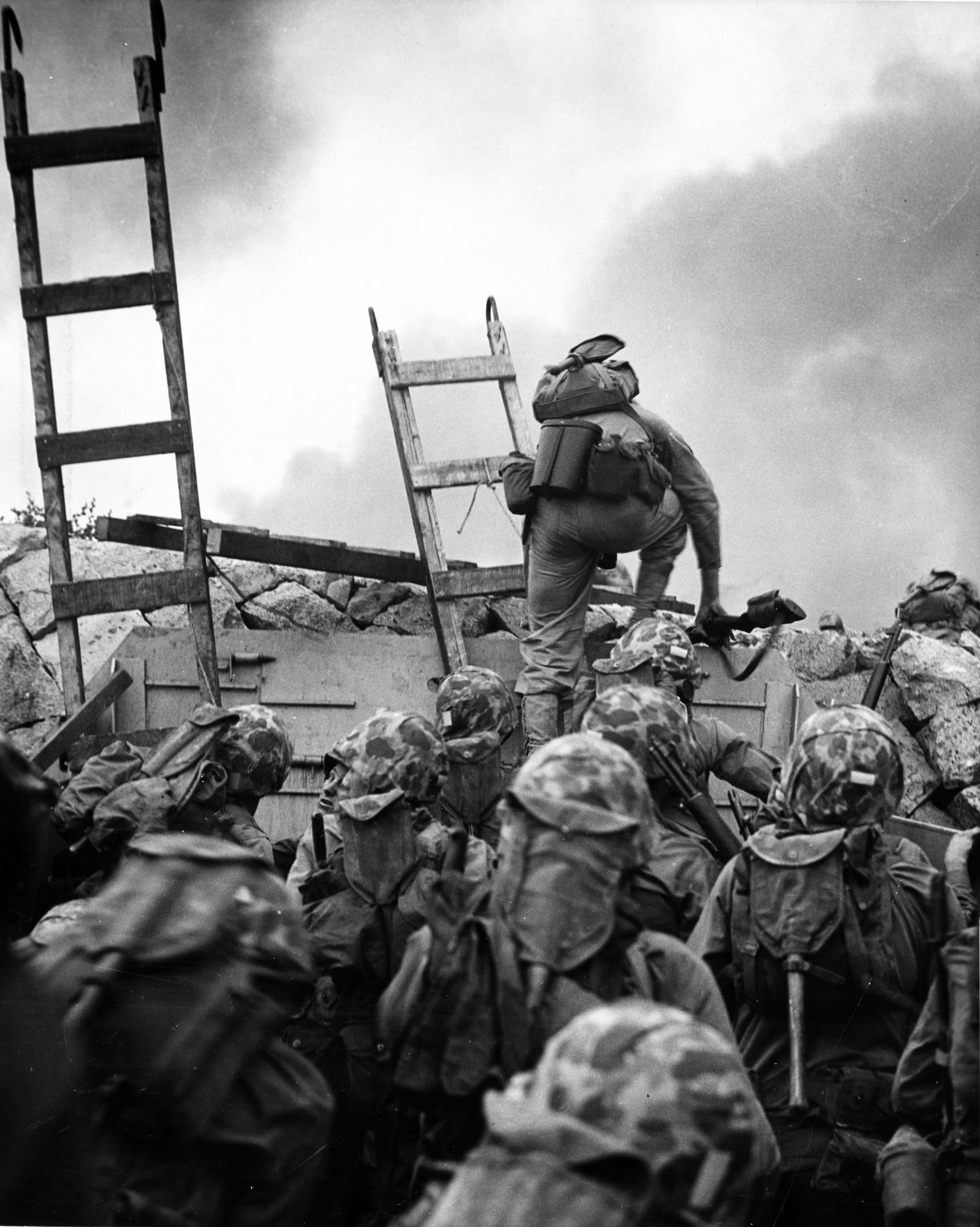
Lieutenant Baldomero Lopez of the Marine Corps is shown scaling a seawall after landing on Red Beach (15 September). Minutes after this photo was taken, Lopez was killed after covering a live grenade with his body. He was posthumously awarded the Medal of Honor.

At 17:24 eight LCVPs crossed the line of departure, carrying the first wave of the 5th Marines 1st and 2nd Battalions. Their objective was to seize Cemetery Hill, British Consulate Hill, and then Observatory Hill. Eight LSTs followed at 1800. Taplett on Wolmi Do would advance his 3d Battalion across the causeway in support.

The Red Beach forces, made up of the Regimental Combat Team 5, which included the 3rd Battalion of the Republic of Korea Marine Corps (ROKMC), used ladders to scale the sea walls. Lieutenant Colonel Raymond L. Murray, serving as commanding officer of the 5th Marines, had the mission of seizing an area 3,000 yards (2,700 m) long and 1,000 yards (910 m) deep, extending from Cemetery Hill (northern) at the top down to the Inner Tidal Basin (near Tidal Basin at the bottom) and including the promontory in the middle called Observatory Hill. (See Map) The 1st Battalion, 5th Marines would be on the left, against Cemetery Hill and northern half of Observatory Hill. The 2nd Battalion, 5th Marines would take the southern half of Observatory Hill and Inner Basin.

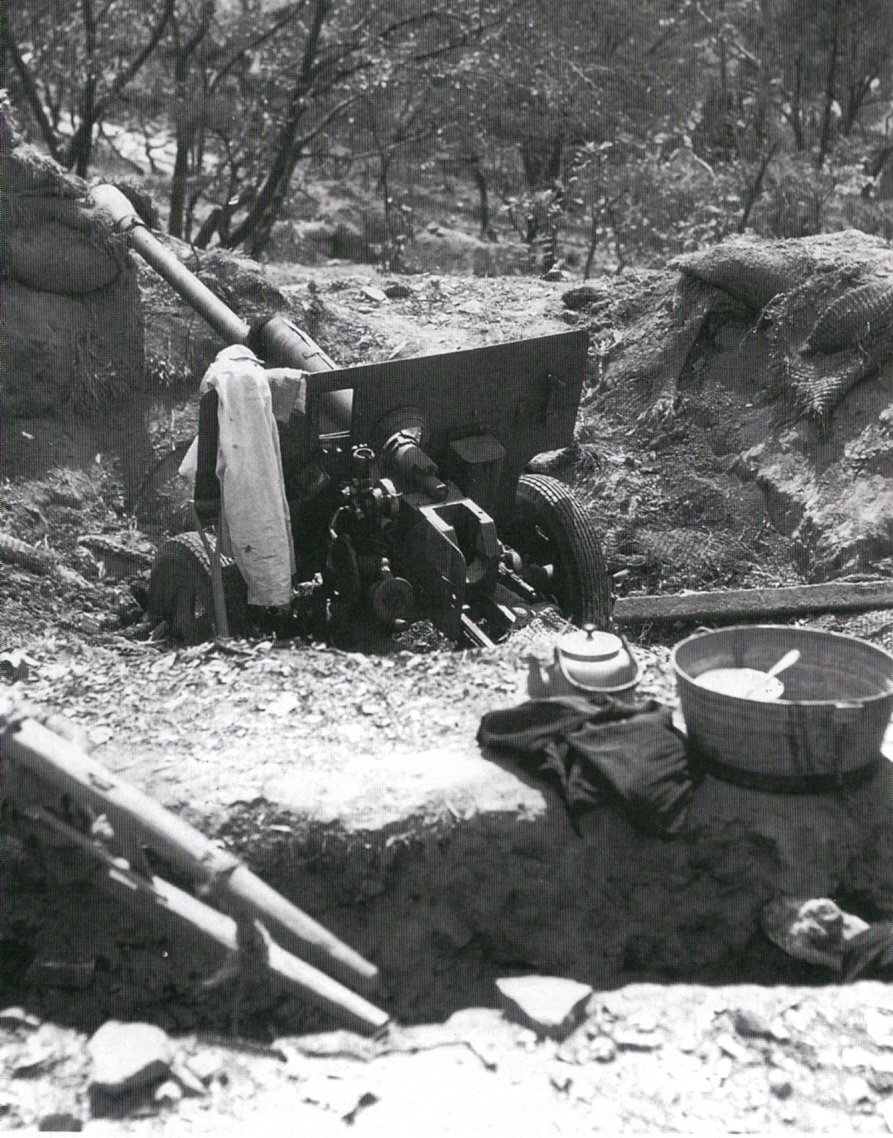
An abandoned Soviet-made North Korean 76 mm divisional gun M1942 (ZiS-3) on a hill overlooking Incheon harbor after its capture by UN forces

Late on the afternoon of 15 September the LSTs approached Red Beach and as the lead ships, they came under heavy mortar and machine gun fire from KPA defenders on Cemetery Hill. Despite the concentrated fire, they disembarked assault troops and unloaded vital support equipment. In addition, their guns wiped out KPA batteries on the right flank of Red Beach. Three (USS King County, USS Lafayette County, and LST 973) of the eight LSTs took some hits from mortar and machine gun fire, which killed a sailor and injured a few others.

=== Blue Beach ===
Lewis "Chesty" Puller's 1st Marine Regiment objective was Blue Beach, 4 miles (6.4 km) southeast of Red Beach. A beachhead there covered the main approach to the Yeongdeungpo District and Seoul. The 2d Battalion and 3d Battalion would land abreast, with the 1st Battalion in reserve behind the 3d. The 2.5 miles of mud flats defining the approach necessitated the use of 172 Amtracs, supported by two LSMRs, launching 2000 5-inch rockets each. At 1730, the first three waves reached the beach. A cove to the right served as a landing point for LVTs able to navigate with only four guide boats in a crosscurrent amidst the smoke, gloom and rain. Yet the beachhead was secured with those three assault waves, allowing the remaining 22 to come ashore. By 2150, the 105mm 1st and 2d Battalions, 11th Marines, were in position and ready to lend artillery support. Through the night, Henry Pierson Crowe's 1st Shore Party Battalion worked unloading their eight LSTs.

Immediately after KPA resistance was extinguished in Incheon, the supply and reinforcement process began. Seabees and Underwater Demolition Teams (UDTs) that had arrived with the US Marines constructed a pontoon dock on Green Beach and cleared debris from the water. The dock was then used to unload the remainder of the LSTs. Early that morning of 16 September, Lieutenant Colonel Murray and Puller had their operational orders from 1st Marine Division commander General Oliver P. Smith. The 5th Marines (from Red and Green Beaches) started generally east along the Incheon-Seoul road, intending to link up with the left of the 1st Marine Regiment so both regiments could move on Seoul. Six solitary T-34 tanks moving west towards Incheon appeared as the advancing 5th Marines reached the village of Kansong-ni. A strike force of eight Marine F4U Corsairs from VMF-214 attacked the tanks, destroying two and driving the others off. M26 Pershing tanks of the 1st Tank Battalion destroyed three more KPA tanks shortly thereafter. South of the 5th Marines, the 1st Marines, having spent most of the day consolidating its scattered units, did not move east until about 16:00.

During the night of 16–17 September, the 2nd Battalion, 5th Marines, occupied a forward defensive position commanding the Seoul highway just west of Ascom City. Behind it the 1st Battalion held a high hill. From a forward roadblock position, members of an advanced platoon of D Company, at 05:45 on the 17th, saw the dim outlines of six tanks on the road eastward. Infantry accompanied the tanks, some riding on the armor. The KPA armored force moved past the hidden outpost of D Company. At 06:00, at a range of 75 yards (69 m), rockets fired from a bazooka set one of the tanks on fire. Pershing tanks now opened fire on the T-34s and recoilless rifles joined in. Within five minutes combined fire destroyed all six enemy tanks and killed 200 of an estimated 250 enemy infantry. Only one man in the 2nd Battalion was wounded.

== Air attack on USS Rochester and HMS Jamaica ==
Just before daylight at 05:50 on 17 September, two Soviet-made North Korean aircraft, a Yakovlev Yak-3 and a Ilyushin Il-10, were seen overhead from Jamaica, and while trying to identify them any doubts about their allegiance and intentions were resolved by the explosion of a bomb close to the port side of Rochester. Four bombs were dropped, one hitting and denting Rochester's crane but not exploding. There were no American casualties. As the aircraft turned away Jamaica opened fire with her port 4-inch (102 mm) battery on the leading aircraft. The aircraft then turned to port to strafe Jamaica, scoring several hits: one armor-piercing round entering Y turret through the armor at the back of the gun house and wounding a man in the leg; one chipping the side armor of the ship; one exploding round burst on the plate surrounding the loaders of a quadruple pom-pom, wounding three men (one of whom died later of his wounds after being transferred to the hospital ship USS Consolation); and one on the foremast at the level of the gun direction platform, scattering small splinters. Every close range weapon available opened fire on the Il-10, which disintegrated as it went over the ship, crashing close to the starboard side of Jamaica.

== Breakthrough ==
=== Kimpo Airfield ===
Kimpo airfield was the largest and most important in Korea and MacArthur demanded its early capture. Once it was secured, the Fifth Air Force and USMC aviation units could bring fighters and bombers over from Japan to operate more easily against North Korea.

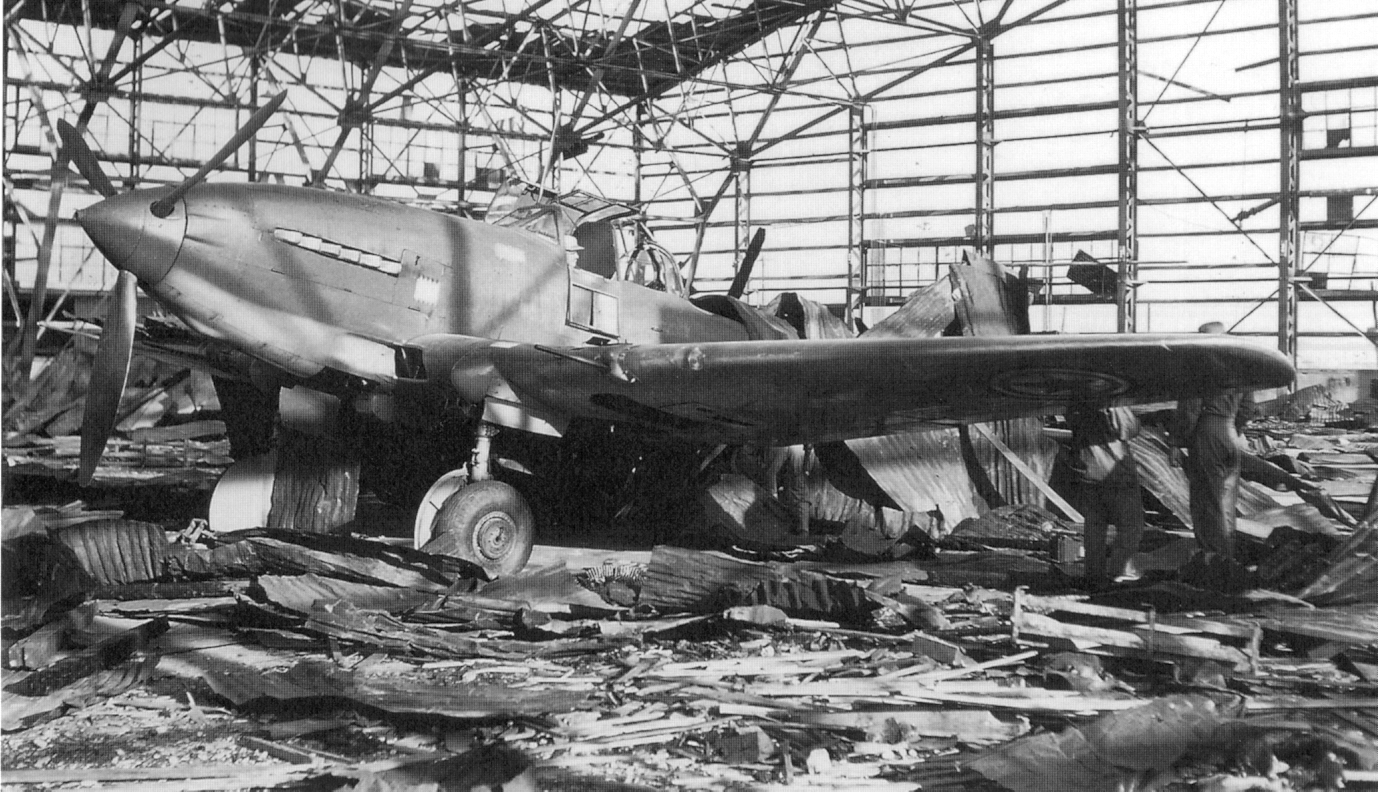
An abandoned Soviet-made North Korean Ilyushin Il-10 attack aircraft at Kimpo airfield in September 1950.

The 5th Marines advanced rapidly on the 17th and by 18:00 its 2nd Battalion was at the edge of Kimpo airfield. In the next two hours the battalion seized the southern part of the airfield. The 400-500 KPA soldiers who ineffectively defended it appeared surprised and had not even mined the runway. During the night several small enemy counterattacks hit the perimeter positions at the airfield between 02:00 and dawn, 18 September. The Marines repulsed these company-sized counterattacks, inflicting heavy casualties on the KPA troops, who finally fled to the northwest; E Company and supporting tanks played the leading role in these actions. Kimpo was secured during the morning of 18 September. Kimpo airfield was in excellent shape; the North Koreans had not had time to do any major demolition. In fact, several North Korean planes were still on the field, including a Yak-3 and two Stormoviks. Kimpo would now become the center of UN land-based air operations.

The Marine VMO-6's Sikorsky HO3S-1 was the first American aircraft to land on the field, while the Yak-3 was flown to Japan for USAF technical evaluation.

On 19 September US engineers repaired the local railroad up to 8 miles (13 km) inland. After the capture of Kimpo airfield, transport planes began flying in gasoline and ordnance for the aircraft stationed there. The Marines continued unloading supplies and reinforcements. By 22 September they had unloaded 6,629 vehicles and 53,882 troops, along with 25,512 tons (23,000 tonnes) of supplies.

=== Advance to the Han River ===
On the 18th, the 2nd Battalion, 5th Marines, sent units on to the Han River beyond the airfield, and the 1st Battalion captured Hill 99 northeast of it and then advanced to the river. Continuing its sweep along the river, the 1st Battalion, 5th Marines, on the 19th swung right and captured the last high ground (Hills 118, 80, and 85) a mile west of Yongdungp'o. At the same time, the 2nd Battalion seized the high ground along the Han River in its sector. At nightfall, 19 September, the 5th Marines held the south bank of the Han River everywhere in its zone and was preparing for a crossing the next morning.

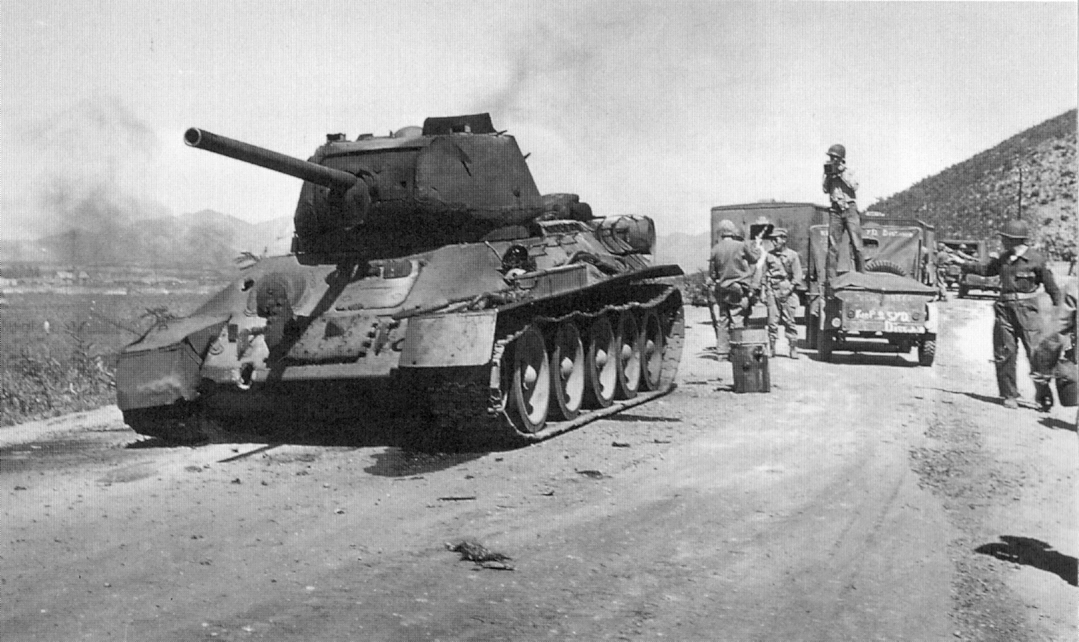
A North Korean T-34 tank knocked out by US Marines during the UN advance from Incheon to Seoul

Meanwhile, the 2nd Engineer Special Brigade relieved the ROK Marines of responsibility for the security of Incheon, and the ROK's moved up on the 18th and 19th to the Han River near Kimpo. Part of the ROK Marines extended the left flank of the 5th Marines, and its 2nd Battalion joined them for the projected crossing of the Han River the next day. In this action, the 1st Marines had attacked east toward Yongdungp'o astride the Seoul highway. Its armored spearheads destroyed four KPA tanks early on the morning of the 17th. Then, from positions on high ground (Hills 208, 107, 178), 3 miles (4.8 km) short of Sosa, a village halfway between Incheon and Yongdungp'o, a regiment of the KPA 18th Division checked the advance. At nightfall the Marine regiment dug in for the night a mile from Sosa. At Ascom City, just west of Sosa, American troops found 2,000 tons of ammunition for American artillery, mortars, and machine guns, captured there by the North Koreans in June, all still in good condition.

On the morning of the 18th the 1st Marines resumed their attack and passed through and around the burning town of Sosa at midmorning. By noon the 3rd Battalion had seized Hill 123, a mile east of the town and north of the highway. KPA artillery fire there caused many casualties in the afternoon, but neither ground nor aerial observers could locate the artillery firing from the southeast. Beyond Sosa the North Koreans had heavily mined the highway and on 19 September the tank spearheads stopped after mines damaged two tanks. Engineers began the slow job of removing the mines and, without tank support, the infantry advance slowed. But at nightfall advanced elements of the regiment had reached Kal-ch'on Creek just west of Yongdungp'o.

On the morning of 18 September, the 7th Infantry Division's 2nd Battalion, 32nd Infantry Regiment landed at Incheon and the remainder of the regiment went ashore later in the day. The next morning, the 2nd Battalion moved up to relieve a Marine battalion occupying positions on the right flank south of Seoul. Meanwhile, the 7th Division's 31st Infantry Regiment came ashore at Incheon. Responsibility for the zone south of Seoul highway passed to the 7th Division at 18:00 on 19 September. The 7th Infantry Division then engaged in heavy fighting with KPA forces on the outskirts of Seoul.

=== Battle of Seoul ===
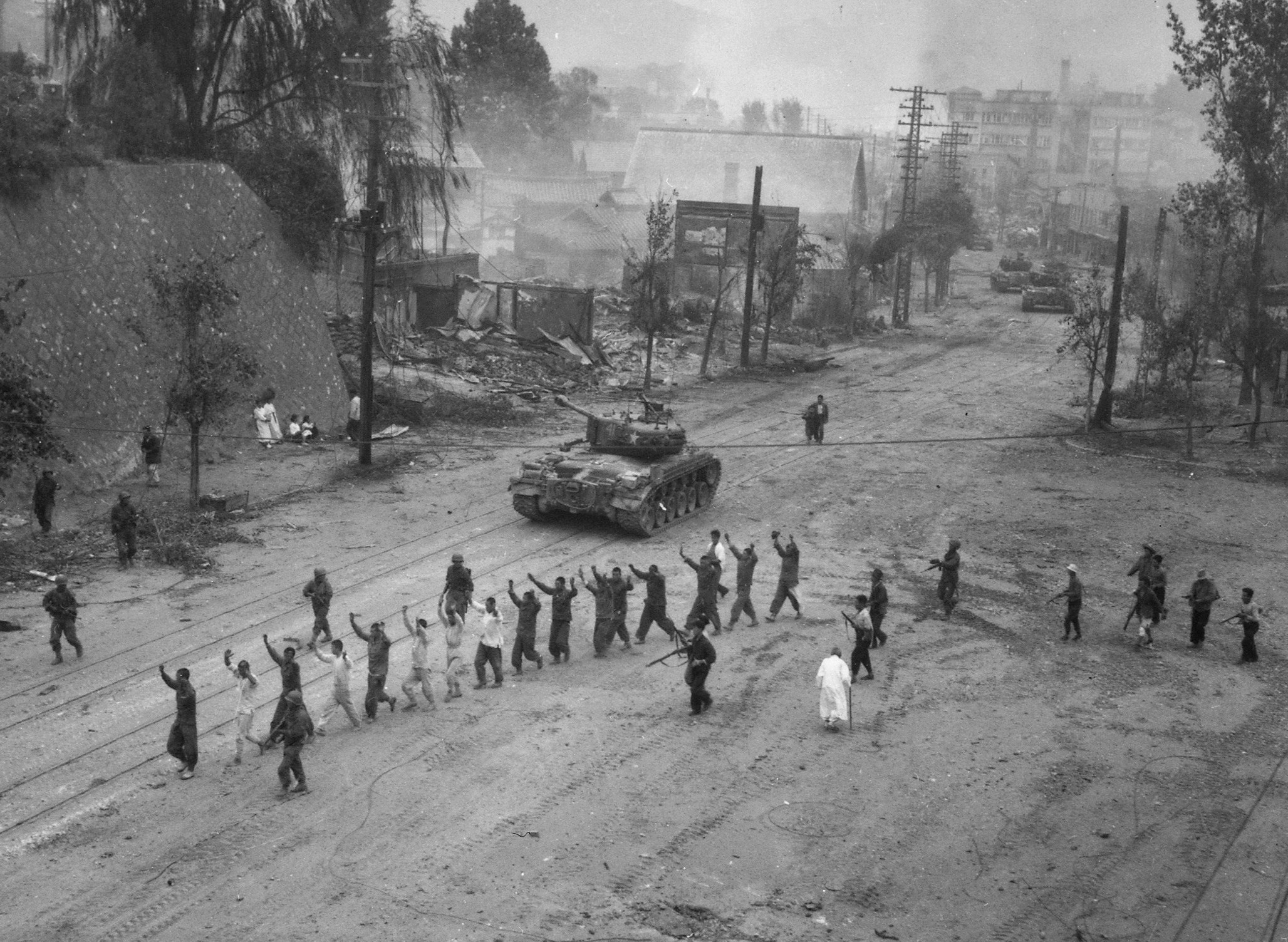
American M26 Pershing tanks in downtown Seoul during the Second Battle of Seoul. In the foreground, UN troops round up North Korean prisoners-of-war

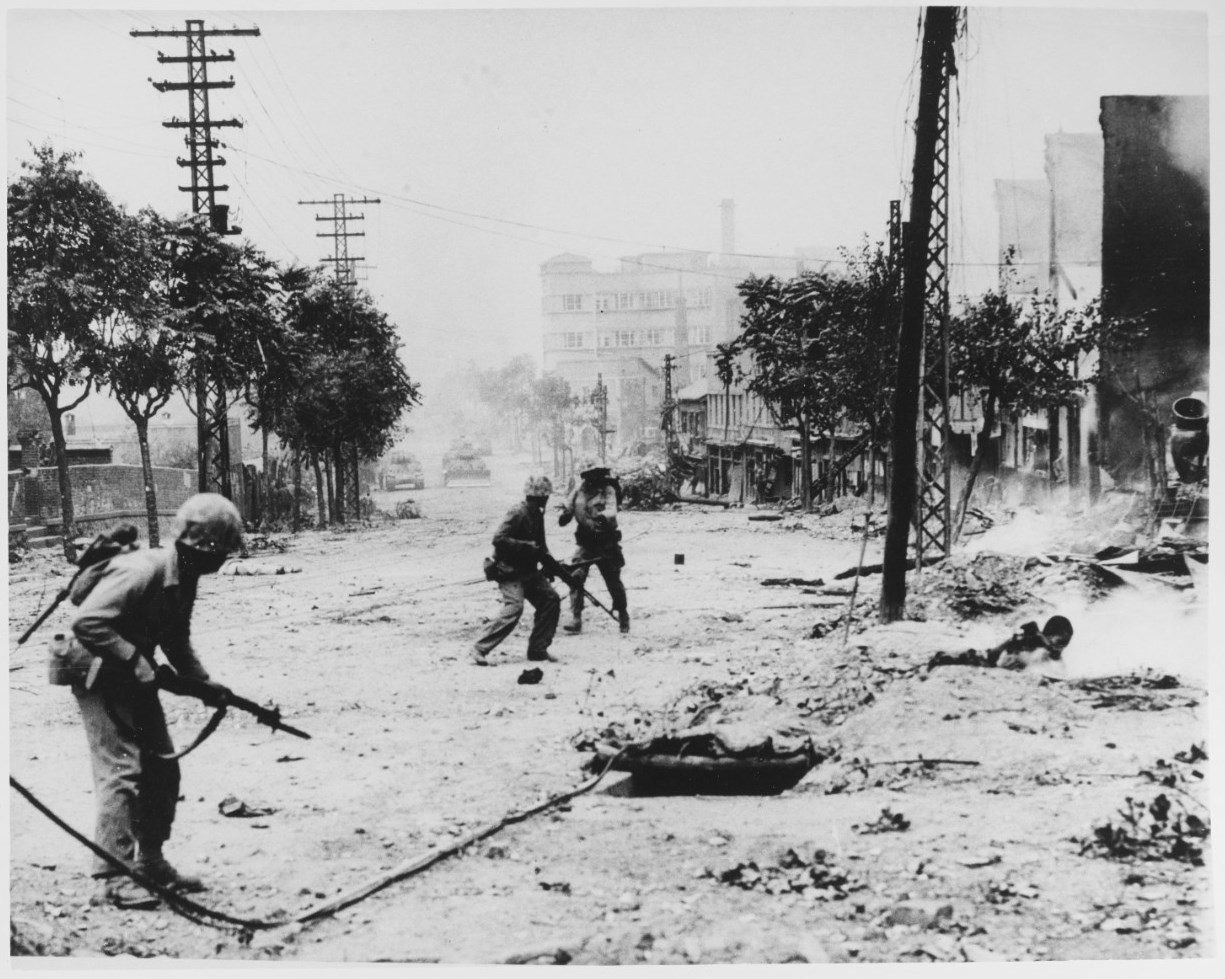
US Marines engaged in urban warfare during the battle for Seoul in late September 1950. The Marines are armed with an M1 rifle and an M1918 Browning Automatic Rifle. On the street are Korean civilians who died in the battle. In the distance are M4 Sherman tanks

In contrast to the quick victory at Incheon, the advance on Seoul was slow and bloody.

Before the battle, North Korea had just one understrength division in the city, with the majority of its forces south of the capital. X Corps commander Almond assumed command of the operation on 21 September and was in an enormous hurry to capture Seoul by 25 September, exactly three months after the North Korean assault across the 38th Parallel. On 20 September, the Marines entered Seoul and casualties mounted as the forces engaged in house-to-house fighting.

Almond declared Seoul liberated the evening of 25 September, a claim repeated by MacArthur the following day. However, at the time of Almond's declaration, US Marines were still engaged in house-to-house combat as the KPA remained in most of the city. It was not until 28 September that the last of the KPA elements were driven out or destroyed.

=== Pusan Perimeter breakout ===
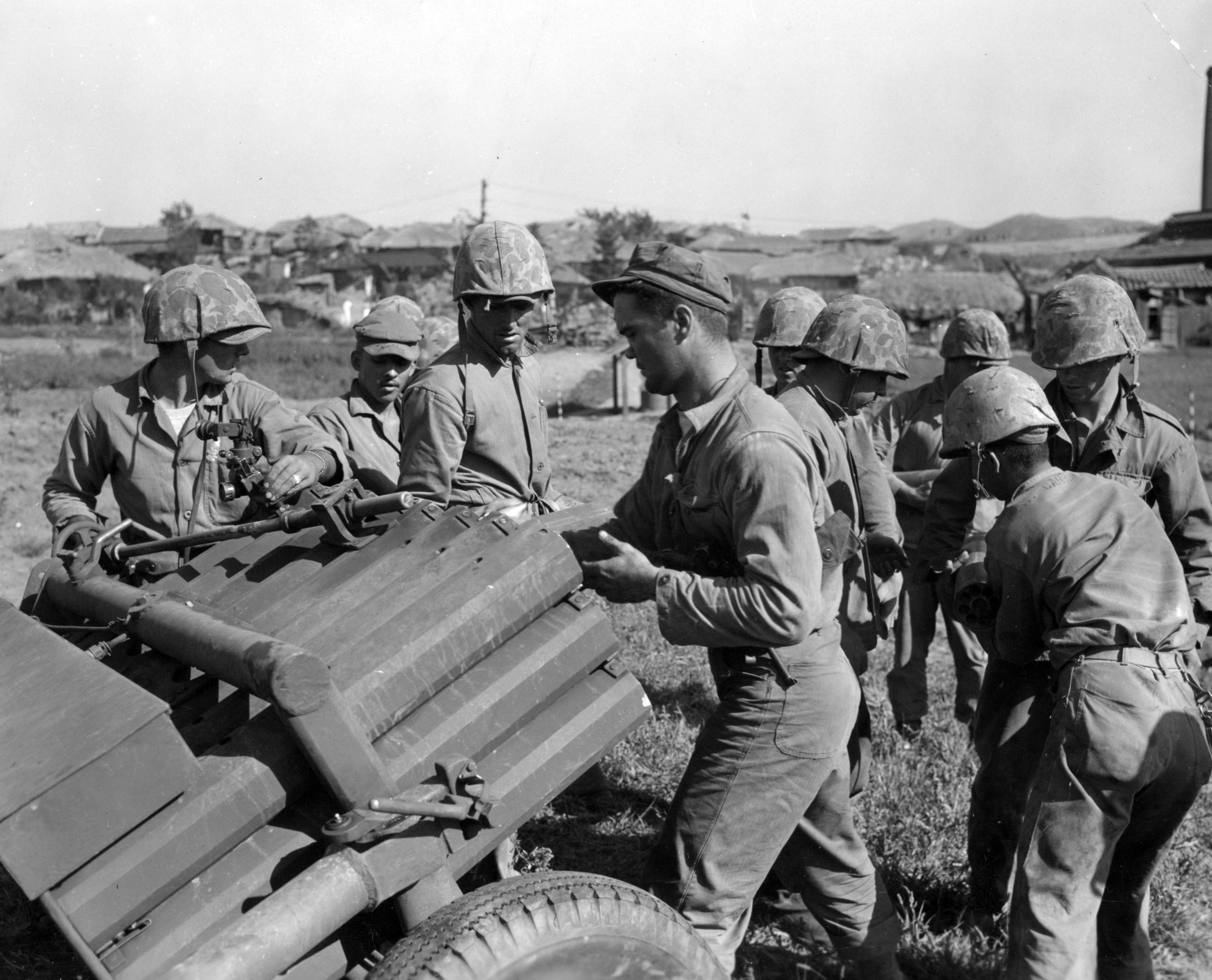
A T66 rocket launcher of the 1st Marine Division being loaded to fire on retreating North Korean forces east of Inchon, 17 September 1950

While the 5th Marines came ashore at Incheon, the last KPA troops in South Korea still fighting were defeated when Walton H. Walker's Eighth Army breakout from the Pusan Perimeter started on 16 September, joining the Army's X Corps in a coordinated attack on KPA forces. By 22 September the KPA forces around the Perimeter were in full retreat and the Eighth Army and ROK forces began a full counteroffensive to pursue the KPA on 23 September. Of the 70,000 KPA troops around Pusan, in the aftermath of the Pusan Perimeter battle, KPA casualties from 1–15 September ranged from 36,000 to 41,000 killed and captured, with an unknown total number of wounded. However, because UN forces had concentrated on taking Seoul rather than cutting off the KPA's withdrawal north, the remaining 30,000 KPA soldiers escaped to the north, where they were soon reconstituted as a cadre for the formation of new KPA divisions hastily re-equipped by the Soviet Union. The UN assault continued into North Korea on 30 September.

== Analysis ==
Most military scholars consider the battle one of the most decisive military operations in modern warfare. Spencer C. Tucker, the American military historian, described the Incheon landings as "a brilliant success, almost flawlessly executed," which remained "the only unambiguously successful, large-scale US combat operation" for the next 40 years. Commentators have described the Incheon operation as MacArthur's "greatest success" and "an example of brilliant generalship and military genius."

However, Russell Stolfi argues that while the landing itself was a strategic masterpiece, it was followed by an advance to Seoul in ground battle so slow and measured that it constituted an operational disaster, largely negating the successful landing. He contrasts the US military's 1950 Incheon-Seoul operation with the German offensive in the Baltic in 1941. American forces achieved a strategic masterpiece in the Incheon landing in September 1950 and then largely negated it by a slow, tentative, 11-day advance on Seoul, only 20 miles (32 km) away. By contrast, in the Baltic region in 1941 the German forces achieved strategic surprise on the first day of their offensive and then, exhibiting a breakthrough mentality, pushed forward rapidly, seizing key positions and advancing almost 200 miles (320 km) in four days. The American advance was characterized by cautious, restrictive orders, concerns about phase lines, limited reconnaissance and command posts well in the rear, while the Germans positioned their leaders as far forward as possible, relied on oral or short written orders, reorganized combat groups to meet immediate circumstances, and engaged in vigorous reconnaissance. Despite this criticism, Incheon was taken within 24 hours with the loss of only a few dozen U.S. troops, and General Walton Walker refused to go on the offensive in southeastern South Korea unless the Incheon landings were successful.

== In popular culture ==
- Inchon (1981), directed by Terence Young with Laurence Olivier as General Douglas MacArthur. Unification Church founder Sun Myung Moon was an executive producer of the film.
- Wolmi Island (1982) North Korean film.
- Operation Chromite (2016), directed by John H. Lee (Lee Jae-han). Starring Lee Jung-jae, Lee Beom-soo, and Liam Neeson as General MacArthur.

== Bibliography ==
- Over the Beach US Army Amphibious Operations in the Korean War - US Army Combinded Arms Center
- Alexander, Bevin (2003). Korea: The First War We Lost. New York City: Hippocrene Books. ISBN 978-0-7818-1019-7.
- Appleman, Roy E. (1998). South to the Naktong, North to the Yalu: United States Army in the Korean War. Washington, D.C.: Department of the Army. ISBN 978-0-16-001918-0. Archived from the original on 21 June 2021.
- Blair, Clay (1987). The Forgotten War: America in Korea, 1950–1953. New York: Times Books. ISBN 0-8129-1670-0.
- Bowers, William T.; Hammong, William M.; MacGarrigle, George L. (2005), Black Soldier, White Army: The 24th Infantry Regiment in Korea, Honolulu, Hawaii: University Press of the Pacific, ISBN 978-1-4102-2467-5
- Catchpole, Brian (2001), The Korean War, London, United Kingdom: Robinson Publishing, ISBN 978-1-84119-413-4
- Clark, Eugene Franklin (2002), The Secrets of Inchon: The Untold Story of the Most Daring Covert Mission of the Korean War, Putnam Pub Group, ISBN 0-399-14871-X
- Fehrenbach, T.R. (2001), This Kind of War: The Classic Korean War History – Fiftieth Anniversary Edition, Washington D.C.: Potomac Books, ISBN 978-1-57488-334-3
- Halberstam, David (2007). The Coldest Winter: America and the Korean War. New York: Hyperion. ISBN 978-1-4013-0052-4.
- Hoyt, Edwin P. (1984), On to the Yalu, New York: Stein and Day, ISBN 0-8128-2977-8
- Korea Institute of Military History (2000). The Korean War. Vol. 1. Lincoln, Nebraska: University of Nebraska Press. ISBN 978-0-8032-7794-6.
- Krulak, Victor H. (Lt. Gen.) (1999), First to Fight: An Inside View of the U.S. Marine Corps, Naval Institute Press, ISBN 978-1-55750-464-7
- MacArthur, Douglas (1964). Reminiscences. New York City: Ishi Press. ISBN 978-4-87187-882-1.
- Marolda, Edward (2007), The US Navy in the Korean War, Annapolis, Maryland: Naval Institute Press, ISBN 978-1-59114-487-8
- Millett, Allan R. (2000), The Korean War, Volume 1, Lincoln, Nebraska: University of Nebraska Press, ISBN 978-0-8032-7794-6
- Utz, Curtis (1994), Assault from the Sea: The Amphibious Landing at Inchon, Washington DC: Naval Historical Center, ISBN 978-0-16-045271-0, archived from the original on 17 October 2004
- Varhola, Michael J. (2000). Fire and Ice: The Korean War, 1950–1953. Mason City, Iowa: Da Capo Press. ISBN 978-1-882810-44-4.
