= Operation Bluehearts =

1950 planned Korean War operation

Operation Bluehearts was code name for the original plan for an amphibious landing behind enemy lines during the Korean War.

More specifically, the plan was to land an assault force from the 1st Cavalry Division and the Marine RCT against the North Korean Army's rear at Incheon as early as 22 July.

But this operation was abandoned by 10 July 1950, and succeeded by Operation Chromite (Inchon landing).

Thereafter, 1st Cavalry Division landed at Pohang on 18 July 1950.

== See also ==
- Battle of Inchon
