= Joint Strategic and Operations Group =

The Joint Strategic and Operations Group, also known as the Joint Strategic Plans and Operations Group (JSPOG), was a committee that was instituted during the Korean War to facilitate communication and interaction between the various United States armed forces.

It played a significant part in both the Battle of Inchon, and Operation Chromite during the Korean War.
