= USS Toledo (CA-133) =

Heavy cruiser of the United States Navy

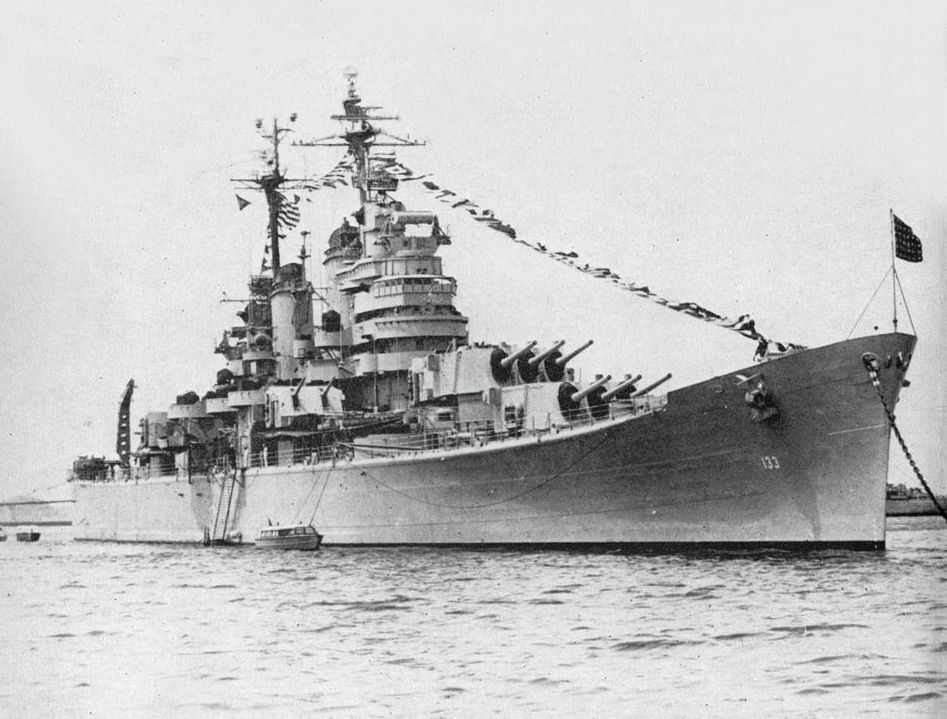
- USS Toledo in 1949

History

United States
- Name: Toledo
- Namesake: City of Toledo, Ohio
- Builder: New York Shipbuilding Corporation
- Laid down: 13 September 1943
- Launched: 6 May 1945
- Commissioned: 27 October 1946
- Decommissioned: 21 May 1960
- Stricken: 1 January 1974
- Identification: Callsign: NHDO; Hull number: CA-133
- Motto: Neptunes Knight; Vigilant
- Honors and awards: See Awards
- Fate: Scrapped, 30 October 1974

General characteristics
- Class & type: Baltimore-class cruiser
- Displacement: 13,600 long tons (13,818 t)
- Length: 674 ft 11 in (205.71 m)
- Beam: 70 ft 10 in (21.59 m)
- Draft: 20 ft 6 in (6.25 m)
- Speed: 33 knots (61 km/h; 38 mph)
- Complement: 1,142 officers and enlisted
- Armament: 9 × 8"/55 caliber guns (3×3); 12 × 5"/38 caliber guns (6×2); 48 × Bofors 40 mm guns (12×4); 28 × single Oerlikon 20 mm cannons

USS Toledo (CA-133) was a Baltimore-class heavy cruiser of the United States Navy active during the Korean War.

Toledo was laid down on 13 September 1943 at Camden, New Jersey, by the New York Shipbuilding Corporation, launched on 6 May 1945, sponsored by Mrs Edward J. Moan, and commissioned at the Philadelphia Naval Shipyard on 27 October 1946, Captain August J. Detzer, Jr., in command.

== Service history ==
=== 1947 ===
On 6 January 1947, the heavy cruiser got underway for a two-month training cruise in the waters of the West Indies. After completing shakedown training out of Guantanamo Bay, she visited St. Thomas in the U.S. Virgin Islands; Kingston, Jamaica; and Port-au-Prince, Haiti, before returning north to Philadelphia and a three-week post-shakedown availability. On 14 April, she departed Philadelphia and shaped a course across the Atlantic. Toledo steamed through the Mediterranean, transited the Suez Canal, crossed the Indian Ocean, and arrived at Yokosuka, Japan, on 15 June. Toledo remained in the Far East visiting Japanese and Korean ports in support of occupation forces until October. On the 21st, she stood out of Yokosuka for her first transpacific voyage and steamed via Pearl Harbor to Long Beach, California, where she arrived on 5 November.

=== 1948 ===
On 3 April 1948, she departed Long Beach in company with the heavy cruiser Helena (CA-75) and shaped a course for Japan. She arrived in Yokosuka on the 24th and began her second tour of occupation duty patrolling for contraband smugglers. Later that spring, the cruiser made a goodwill cruise to the Indian Ocean during which she stopped at Karachi, Pakistan; Singapore, Malaya; Trincomalee, Ceylon; and Bombay, India. After her return to the northwestern Pacific in early summer, Toledo operated out of Tsingtao, China, during the evacuation of Chiang Kai-shek's Nationalist Chinese forces to Taiwan. On 16 September, the warship departed the China coast and headed for Bremerton, Washington, entering the Puget Sound Naval Shipyard on 5 October for her first major overhaul.

=== 1949–1950 ===
The cruiser's refurbishing was completed on 18 February 1949; and she headed back to Long Beach for six months of training along the coasts of California, Mexico, and the Isthmus of Panama. Among other exercises, she participated in Operation Miki, a simulated air-sea assault on Pearl Harbor. On 14 October, Toledo stood out of Long Beach to resume duty in the Far East. For eight months, she cruised the waters between Japan, China, the Philippines, and the Marianas.

Toledo returned to Long Beach on 12 June 1950, less than two weeks before North Korean forces invaded the Republic of Korea (ROK), beginning the Korean War. Ten days later, Toledo pointed her bow west once more and embarked upon her fourth cruise to the Orient and her first tour of combat duty.

=== Korean War ===
==== 1950 ====
Toledo made a brief stop at Pearl Harbor en route and continued on to Sasebo, where Rear Admiral John M. Higgins, Commander, Cruiser Division 5, broke his flag in her on 18 July 1950. Eight days later, the cruiser took up station off the eastern coast of Korea a few miles north of Pohang, near Yongdok. She teamed up with Destroyer Division 91 to form one of the two alternating East Coast Support Elements of Task Group 95.5. From 27 July to 30 July, Toledo, Mansfield (DD-728), and Collett (DD-730) bombarded North Korean communication arteries which started at Yongdok and ran north between the mountains and the sea to the 38th parallel north. On 4 August, the task element joined Air Force fighters in a combined air-sea strike on an enemy-held village near Yongdok. The following day, her 8-inch guns, directed by airborne controllers, rendered call-fire for the front-line troops. Toledo then moved some 70 miles north to the area around Samchok where she cruised along a 25-mile stretch of coastline and shelled a number of targets. During that interdiction run, she demolished a bridge, chewed up highway intersections, and generally wreaked havoc on communist supply lines. On the 6th, Helena relieved Toledo, enabling her to return to Sasebo for upkeep.

The warship resumed station off the Korean coast on 15 August and operated with Rochester (CA-124), Mansfield, Collett, and Lyman K. Swenson (DD-729) along a 40-mile length of coast from Songjin south to Riwon. After a number of bombardment missions, she returned to Sasebo again on the 26th and remained there until 31 August when she headed for a week of duty off Pohang Dong.

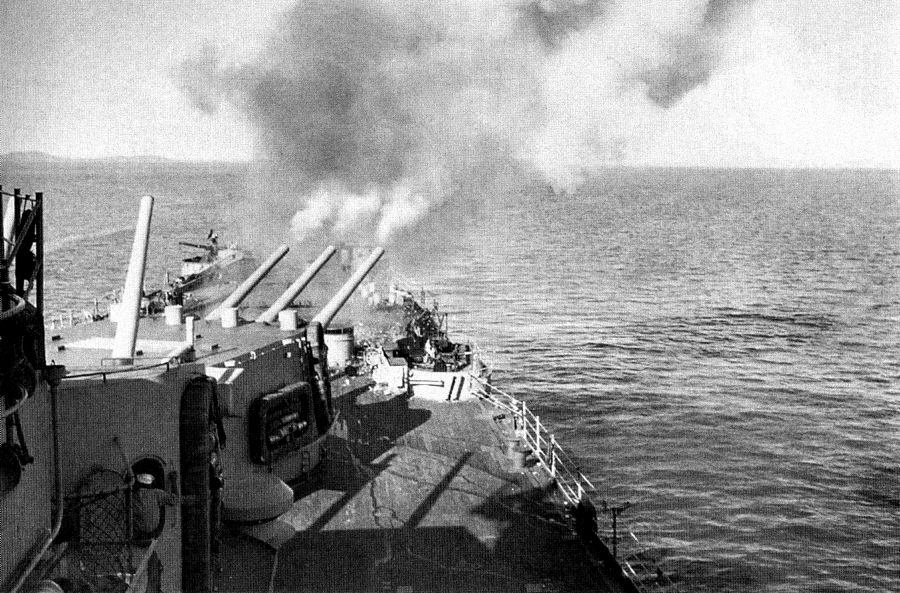
Toledo's after turret fires its 8-inch (203-mm) guns at enemy targets ashore around Inchon, South Korea, on 13 or 14 September 1950 during the bombardment preceding the invasion of Inchon.

Toledo's next important mission was the landing at Inchon in mid-September. The heavily armed and fortified island of Wolmi-do – located in the harbor – threatened the success of the operation. Therefore, Toledo and her previous consorts – augmented by Gurke (DD-783), De Haven (DD-727), and Royal Navy light cruisers, Jamaica (44) and Kenya (14) – entered the harbor to silence the island's guns on 13 September. The destroyers led the way through the mine-infested channel and moved in close to draw enemy fire while the cruisers stood off waiting for the North Koreans to betray their positions. By early afternoon, the artillery duel had begun; and the enemy suffered most. That evening, the cruisers and destroyers retired for the night. They returned the next day to finish the job. Then, after two days of preparatory bombardment, marines of the 3rd Battalion Landing Team, 5th Marines, stormed Wolmi-do's defenses. Meanwhile, Toledo redirected her fire to support the 1st Marines who were about to land on "Blue Beach" just south of Inchon proper. After reportedly destroying three gun emplacements and a number of machine gun nests, closing two tunnels, hitting trenches and mortar positions, Toledo retired for the night at 1525.

Toledo continued fire-support missions until early October. However, after the 18th, the marines had advanced beyond the range of her 8-inch guns; and Toledo shifted to support troops mopping up bypassed pockets of enemy resistance. On 5 October, she departed the area and steamed for Sasebo.

The cruiser returned to the Korean coast at Chaho Han on 13 October, conducted shore bombardments in preparation for the amphibious operation at Wonsan, and reentered Sasebo the following day. The warship got underway again a little before midnight on the 18th and arrived off Wonsan early the next morning. For the next three days, she supported the marines during their advance inland from Wonsan.

On 22 October, Toledo departed Korea and, after stops at Sasebo and Yokosuka, headed for the United States on the 27th. Steaming via Pearl Harbor, she arrived in Long Beach on 8 November and remained there until the 13th when she headed for San Francisco. The following day, she entered the Hunter's Point Naval Shipyard and began a three-month overhaul.

==== 1951 ====
Refurbishment completed, Toledo left the yard on 24 February 1951 and returned to Long Beach the next evening. Following a round-trip voyage to San Diego, the warship weighed anchor on 2 April to return to the western Pacific. She stopped over at Pearl Harbor from the 7th to the 9th and then continued on to Sasebo, where she arrived on the 18th.

Toledo began her second tour of duty in the Korean combat zone on 26 April. For the next month, she cruised off the coast near Inchon where she provided gunfire support for the front-line troops of the US I Corps, guarding the Han River line during the communist spring offensive of 1951. Throughout that month, however, the enemy generally remained well beyond the river, out of range of the cruiser's 8-inch battery.

On 26 May, she steamed north to Kansong and joined Task Element 95.28 to conduct an interdiction bombardment of the area. Then, between 28 May and 30 May, the enemy did venture close enough to the Han to allow Toledo to bring her main battery to bear, but only at extreme range. The cruiser spent the first 10 days of June at Yokosuka; then returned to the Korean coast on 12 June. On 18 June, she teamed up with Duncan (DD-874) and Everett (PF-8) to pummel the important enemy logistics junction located at Songjin.

The warship made a brief visit to Sasebo before heading back to Wonsan where, on the 27th, she joined Bradford (DD-545) in shelling the enemy ashore. The following evening, she endured her first hostile fire when shore batteries opened up on the cruiser and came dangerously close on several occasions.

Toledo's tour of duty along the eastern coast of Korea lasted until late November. She bombarded Wonsan, Songjin, and Chongjin and rescued several downed pilots — one, from Boxer (CV-21), twice. Late in October, her guns supported the 1st Marine Division in operations near Kansong. While conducting a shore bombardment on 11 November, she again came under fire from an enemy shore battery which scored some close near misses.

On 24 November, Toledo completed her deployment to the western Pacific and stood out of Yokosuka to return to the United States. After a pause at Pearl Harbor from 1 to 3 December, she continued on to Long Beach, where she arrived on the 8th.

==== 1952 ====
In January 1952, after a month of leave and upkeep, Toledo began seven months of duty operating out of Long Beach, conducting drills and training exercises along the west coast of the United States until mid-August. On 16 August, the cruiser stood out of Long Beach to return to the western Pacific. After the customary stop at Pearl Harbor, she arrived in Yokosuka on 8 September.

Toledo embarked upon her third combat tour along the coast of Korea on 12 September when she stood out of Yokosuka. During the latter part of the month, her 8-inch guns aided the American X Corps and the ROK I Corps. She supported the United Nations forces' limited offensives and holding actions while armistice talks dragged on. Periodically, she cleared that area to participate in gun strikes near Wonsan and in coastal patrols. On 24 September, she was called upon to provide continuous illumination fire and to silence an enemy 120-millimeter howitzer while United Nations forces recaptured positions recently lost to the communists.

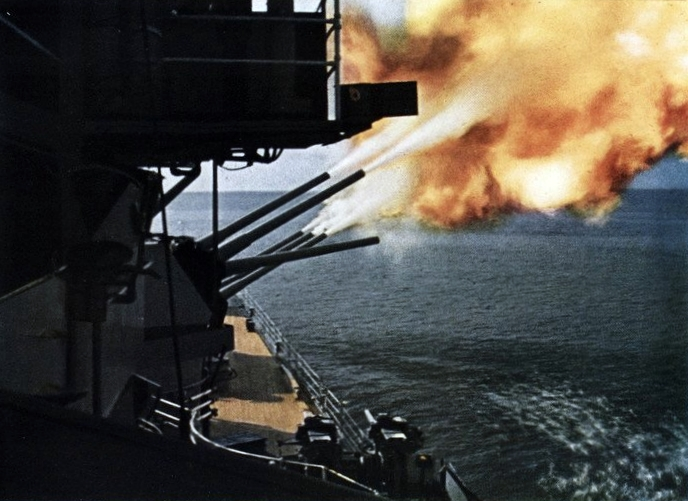
Toledo firing her forward guns.

She made an overnight port call at Sasebo on the 29th and 30th, visited the Bonin Islands from 2 through 4 October, and stopped at Yokosuka on the 5th and 6th, before taking up station on the bombline once more on the 8th. On 11 October, she joined the carriers of TF 77 and, for the next three months, alternated frequently between that duty and shore bombardment assignments. On 12 October, an enemy 75 millimeter gun managed to straddle her with eight rounds before 48 rounds from her 5-inch battery silenced it. Just before 0200 on the 14th, a gun opened fire from the same spot, scoring three near misses but no hits. Other than those instances and some long-range snooping by MiG 15's, little action came Toledo's way during her third and final Korean War deployment.

==== 1953 ====
In mid-January 1953, she visited Hong Kong for rest and relaxation before resuming patrols off Wonsan and Songjin and fire support duties for the American X and ROK I Corps. On 28 February 1953, Toledo departed Yokosuka and shaped a course for the United States. Following an overnight stop at Oahu on the night of 10 March and 11 March, the cruiser moored at Long Beach on St. Patrick's Day, 1953. She departed Long Beach on 13 April and, after a two-day call at San Diego, arrived in San Francisco on the 16th. There, she entered the Hunter's Point Naval Shipyard for a five-month overhaul.

Toledo was still undergoing repairs when hostilities in Korea ended with the armistice of 27 July 1953. She departed San Francisco on 10 September and, after operations along the coast, headed for Pearl Harbor on 20 October. The cruiser reached Yokosuka on 7 November and began her seventh deployment to the Far East. Though the Korean War had ended the previous summer, American forces continued to patrol the waters along the Korean peninsula; and Toledo joined them in the endeavor. In fact, she spent the next six months operating out of Sasebo and Yokosuka in the waters between Japan and Korea and in the East China Sea. She visited Pusan, Inchon, and Pohang as well as Okinawa and Hong Kong. In addition to patrolling the neutral waters off the Korean coast, she periodically conducted exercises with the carriers of TF 77.

=== 1954–1955 ===
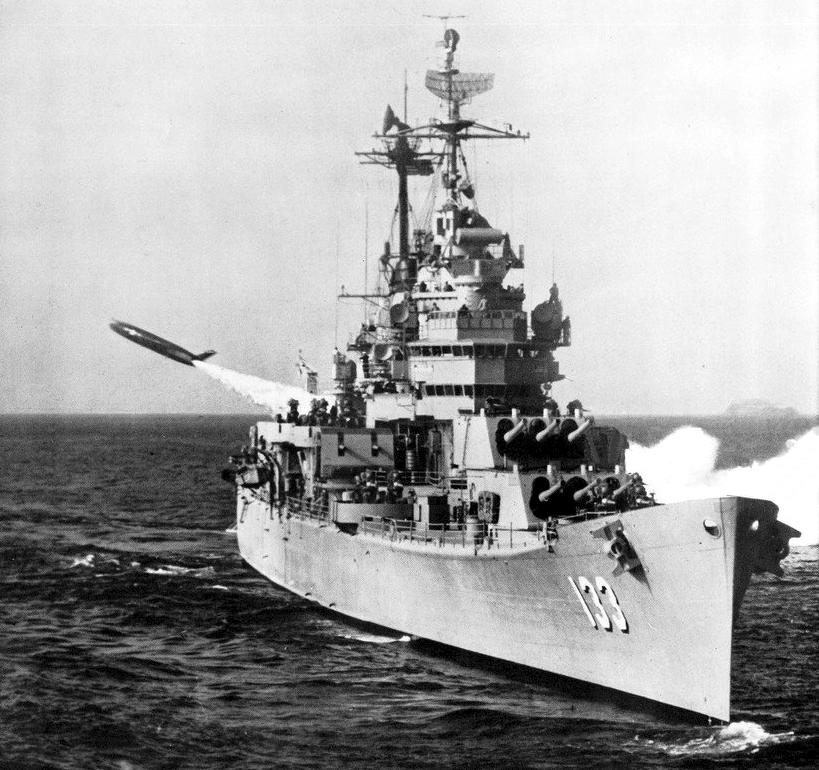
Toledo launching a SSM-N-8 Regulus cruise missile.

On 13 April 1954, the warship entered Yokosuka for upkeep following exercises in the Sea of Japan and preparatory to her return home. Three days later, she began her transpacific passage. She made the usual call at Pearl Harbor and tied up at Long Beach on May Day.

With one notable exception, Toledo's eighth deployment to the Far East set the pattern for all those to follow. After almost five months of normal operations along the western coast of the United States, the cruiser cleared Long Beach on 14 September. She stopped at Pearl Harbor on the 21st for five days of rest and relaxation and then continued her voyage to Yokosuka where she arrived on 7 November. For the most part, her deployment consisted of training operations, goodwill calls at a number of ports, and general patrol and show-the-flag duties. During this tour of duty, she visited Hong Kong, Kobe, Nagasaki, Beppu, Subic Bay, and Manila.

The single exception to this peaceful routine came in January 1955. Toledo joined TF 77 in the waters between Taiwan and mainland China to support another evacuation of Nationalist Chinese forces — this time from the Tachen Islands. She took station about 1,500 yards off the islands as flagship of the naval gunfire support group. Throughout the operation, she and the other units of the group provided close-in support for the amphibious craft engaged in the actual evacuation. At the completion of that operation, the cruiser resumed the duties which became her normal Far Eastern routine.

On 5 March 1955, she departed Japan in company with Pittsburgh (CA-72) to return to the United States and arrived in Long Beach 17 days later. She conducted operations along the west coast until 16 June when she began a four-month overhaul at the Puget Sound Naval Shipyard in Bremerton. The cruiser resumed duty late in October and cruised the west coast until early in 1956.

=== 1956–1959 ===
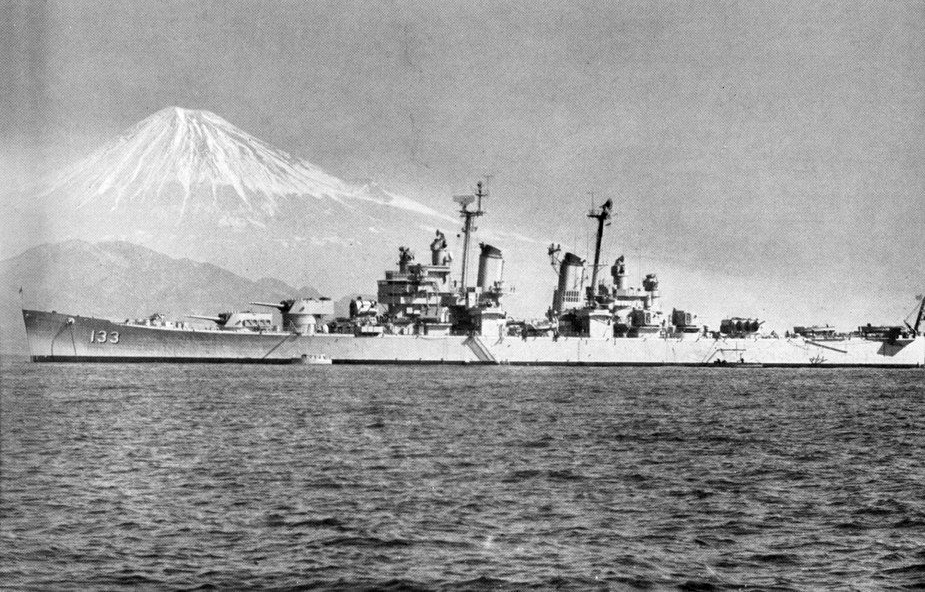
USS Toledo (CA-133) in Tokyo Bay, 1959.

Toledo's active Navy career lasted four more years. During that period, she made four more deployments to the western Pacific. All save one consisted of routine operations, conducted out of bases in Japan and in the Philippines. The one exception came early in 1958. The cruiser cleared the west coast on 19 February and reached Japan early in March. However, after visiting Sasebo and Yokosuka, she headed south to Australia rather than to normal 7th Fleet operations. She reached Sydney on 30 April and remained there for five days as a guest of the Australian government during the 15th anniversary celebration of the Battle of the Coral Sea. After Sydney, Toledo also visited Melbourne before returning north to Japan via Okinawa to resume 7th Fleet operations. The deployment ended on 26 August 1958 when Toledo steamed back into Long Beach. The warship made one more deployment to the western Pacific between 9 June and 25 November 1959.

=== Decommissioning and scrapping ===
On 5 January 1960, she entered Long Beach Naval Shipyard to begin inactivation overhaul. Toledo completed preparations and was placed out of commission at Long Beach on 21 May 1960. She was moved to San Diego soon thereafter and remained there, in reserve, for the next 14 years.

On 1 January 1974, her name was struck from the Navy List, and she was sold to the National Metal and Steel Corporation, Terminal Island, California, on 30 October 1974 for $983,461.29.

== Awards ==
Toledo earned five battle stars for service during the Korean War.
