= Arthur Dewey Struble =

United States Navy admiral (1894–1983)

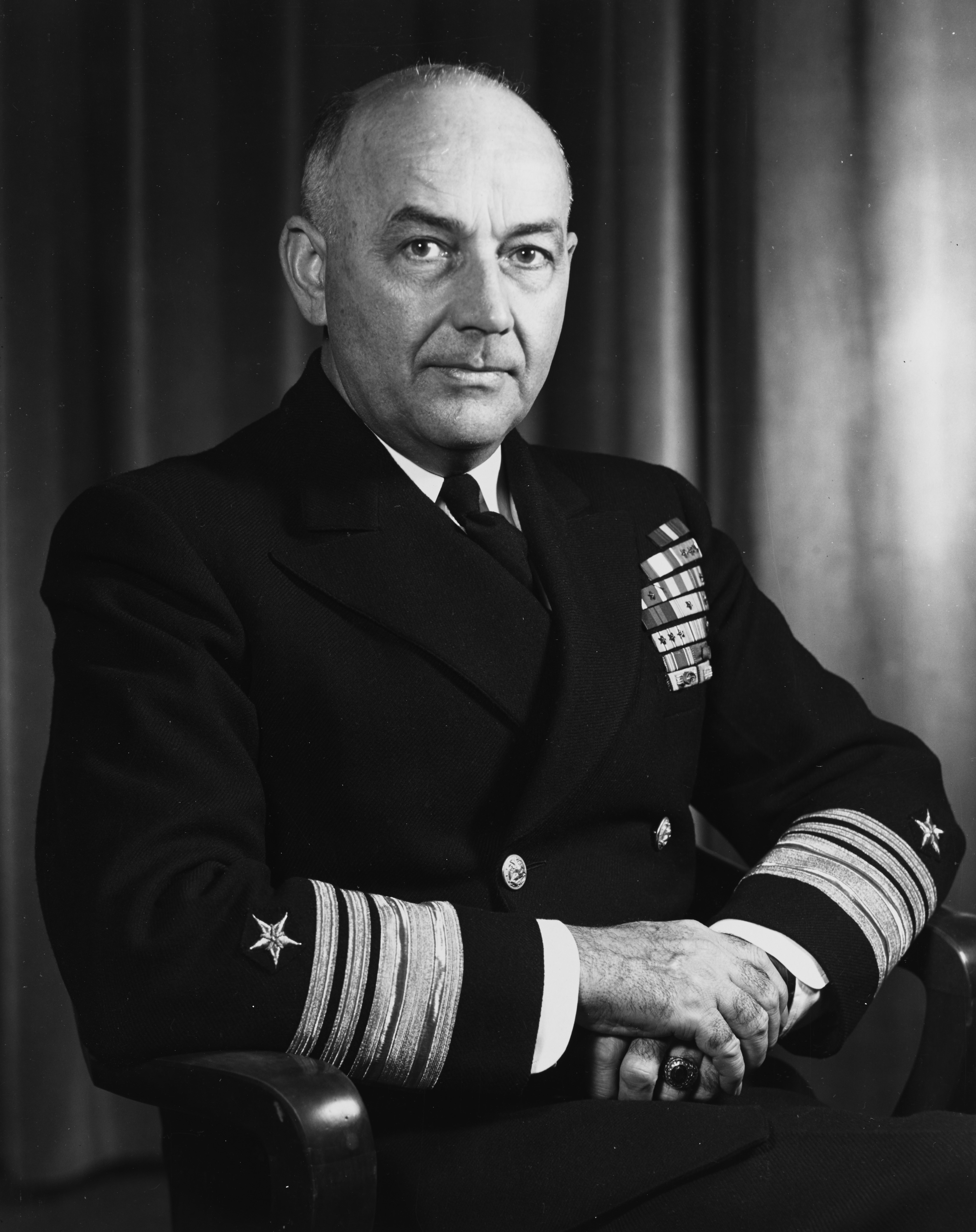
- Vice Admiral Struble, USN
- Born: June 28, 1894; Portland, Oregon, U.S.
- Died: May 1, 1983 (aged 88)
- Burial place: Arlington National Cemetery
- Military career
- Allegiance: United States
- Branch: United States Navy
- Service years: 1915–1956
- Rank: Admiral
- Commands: Eastern Sea Frontier; Atlantic Reserve Fleet; First Fleet; Seventh Fleet; USS Trenton (CL-11)
- Conflicts: World War I World War II; Korean War
- Awards: Distinguished Service Cross; Navy Distinguished Service Medal (2); Army Distinguished Service Medal; Legion of Merit (3)

Arthur Dewey Struble (June 28, 1894 – May 1, 1983) was a United States Navy admiral who served in World War II and the Korean War.

== Biography ==
1953 interview

Struble was born in Portland, Oregon. Following graduation from high school in Portland, he entered the United States Naval Academy in 1911 and was commissioned as an ensign in June 1915. Over the next six years, he served in two cruisers, a supply ship and three destroyers. In 1921–23, Struble was an instructor at the Naval Academy, then served in the battleship California (BB-44) until 1925, when he was assigned to the Battle Fleet staff. From 1927 until 1940, he served twice in Navy Department billets, twice on seagoing flag staffs, in New York (BB-34) and Portland (CA-33), and at the 12th Naval District. In 1940–41, he was Executive Officer of Arizona (BB-39). Captain Struble next commanded the light cruiser Trenton (CL-11) in the Pacific.

Leaving Trenton in May 1942, Struble had duty in the Office of the Chief of Naval Operations until late 1943, when he became Chief of Staff to Rear Admiral Alan G. Kirk, who was responsible for U.S. Navy participation in the Normandy Invasion of June 1944. Rear Admiral Struble was assigned to command a Seventh Fleet amphibious group in August 1944, and participated in the invasion of Leyte the following October. Over the next several months, he commanded or participated in landing operations at Ormoc Bay, Mindoro, Luzon and elsewhere in the Philippines. In September 1945, following the end of the Pacific war, Struble commanded the Pacific Fleet's mine force as it began the long process of clearing mines from the former combat zone.

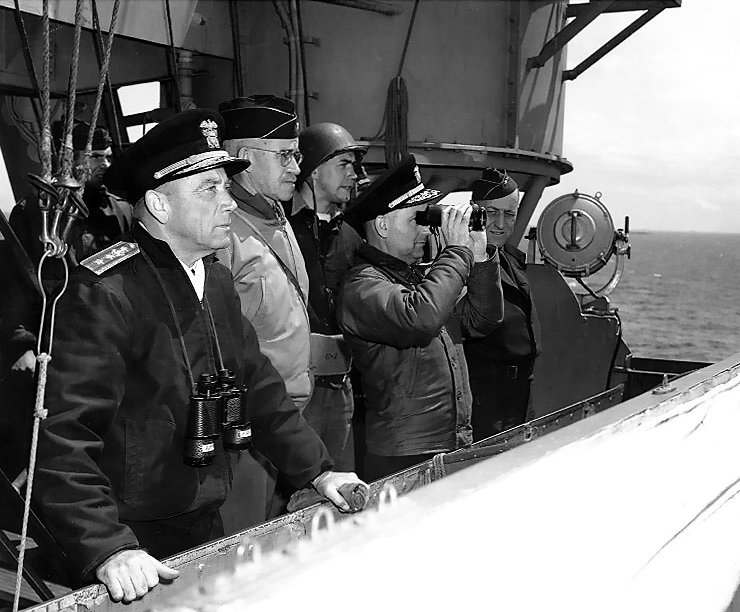
Senior officers watching operations from the bridge of USS Augusta (CA-31), off Normandy, June 8, 1944. They are (from left to right): Rear Admiral Alan G. Kirk, Lieutenant General Omar Bradley, Rear Admiral Arthur D. Struble (with binoculars), and Major General William B. Kean.

He commanded the Amphibious Force, Pacific Fleet, during 1946–48. Promoted to vice admiral in April 1948, Struble served for two years as Deputy Chief of Naval Operations.

In May 1950, he took command of the Seventh Fleet, leading that force through the difficult first year of the Korean War, including the landings at Inchon and Wonsan. For a year, beginning in March 1951, Vice Admiral Struble was Commander, First Fleet, then served briefly with the Joint Chiefs of Staff before being assigned successively to head the U.S. Naval and U.S. Military delegations to the United Nations' Military Staff Committee. From June 1955, he was Commander Eastern Sea Frontier and Commander Atlantic Reserve Fleet. Upon his retirement from active duty in July 1956, he was advanced to the rank of admiral on the basis of his combat awards.

Admiral Arthur D. Struble died on May 1, 1983.

== Awards and honors ==

Distinguished Service Cross		Navy Distinguished Service Medal w/ 5/16" gold star
Army Distinguished Service Medal	Legion of Merit w/ two 5/16" gold stars	Navy Unit Commendation w/ 3/16" bronze star
Mexican Service Medal	World War I Victory Medal w/ 'Destroyer' clasp	Haitian Campaign Medal
American Defense Service Medal w/ Fleet clasp	American Campaign Medal	European–African–Middle Eastern Campaign Medal w/ 3/16" bronze star
Asiatic-Pacific Campaign Medal w/ 3/16" silver star	World War II Victory Medal	Navy Occupation Service Medal w/ 'Japan' clasp
China Service Medal	National Defense Service Medal	Korean Service Medal w/ 3/16" bronze star
Philippine Liberation Medal w/ two 3/16" bronze stars	Officer of the Legion of Honour (France)	Croix de Guerre with Palm (France)
Grand Commander of the Order of the Phoenix (Greece)	Grand Cordon of the Order of Leopold with Palm (Belgium)	Croix de Guerre with Palm (Belgium)
Order of Military Merit, Eulji Medal with silver star (South Korea)	United Nations Korea Medal	Korean War Service Medal (retroactive)
