= AN/SPS-39 =

Cold War-era US Navy early warning radar

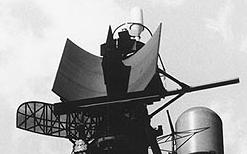
- AN/SPS-39 aboard a USS Atlanta
- Country of origin: United States
- Manufacturer: Hughes Aircraft Company
- Introduced: 1960
- No. built: 89
- Type: 3D
- Frequency: S Band
- PRF: 1850 Hz
- Beamwidth: 1.1° × 2.25°
- Pulsewidth: 4 µs
- Range: 296 km (160 nmi)
- Azimuth: Unlimited
- Power: 1 MW

AN/SPS-39 is a three-dimensional radar was manufactured by Hughes Aircraft Company. It was used by the US Navy as a parabolic-cylinder reflector antenna after World War II, and was equipped aboard naval ships during the Cold War. It was mass-produced based on AN/SPS-26, and was also the first 3D radar deployed by the US Navy in the fleet. It later evolved into an improved AN/SPS-52.

In accordance with the Joint Electronics Type Designation System (JETDS), the "AN/SPS-39" designation represents the 39th design of an Army-Navy electronic device for surface ship search radar system. The JETDS system also now is used to name all Department of Defense electronic systems.

== Development ==
Immediately after World War II, the development of a radar with a new principle called 3D radar began. First, the multi-beam type AN/SPS-2 was developed, but the mechanism was too complicated, so it was only prototyped. Later, as an epoch-making electronic scanning method, Mr. Yarou of Hughes developed a method called frequency scanning (FRESCAN). This changed the phase of the radio wave by changing the frequency of the emitted radio wave, and directed the radio wave beam.

In response to this, the AN/SPS-26 was prototyped as an experimental aircraft radar that adopted the FRESCAN method for vertical scanning and the mechanical method by turning the antenna for horizontal scanning. The land test was started in 1953, and the offshore test was started in August 1957 in Norfolk. And as a practical machine with improved reliability, this machine was handed over to the Navy in January 1960.

=== Design ===
As the antenna, a vertically long cylindrical parabolic antenna similar to AN/SPS-26 is used. However, while AN/SPS-26 was electronically stabilized, AN/SPS-39 introduced a mechanical stabilization mechanism that was diverted from the elevation radar. Later, MTI technology was also adopted. Mean time between failures (MTBF) was only 14.2 hours during testing from 1960 to 1962, but with later improvements, Series III was 43.2 hours on Sampson-equipped aircraft, and USS Galveston. It was supposed to be 67.4 hours on the onboard aircraft.

The AN/SPS-42, which later introduced an interface with the Naval Tactical Data System (NTDS), and the further improved AN/SPS-52 were developed. The AN/SPS-39 Series III, which was deployed in 1963, uses a planar array antenna of the same type as the AN/SPS-52, which makes it visually indistinguishable from the AN/SPS-52.

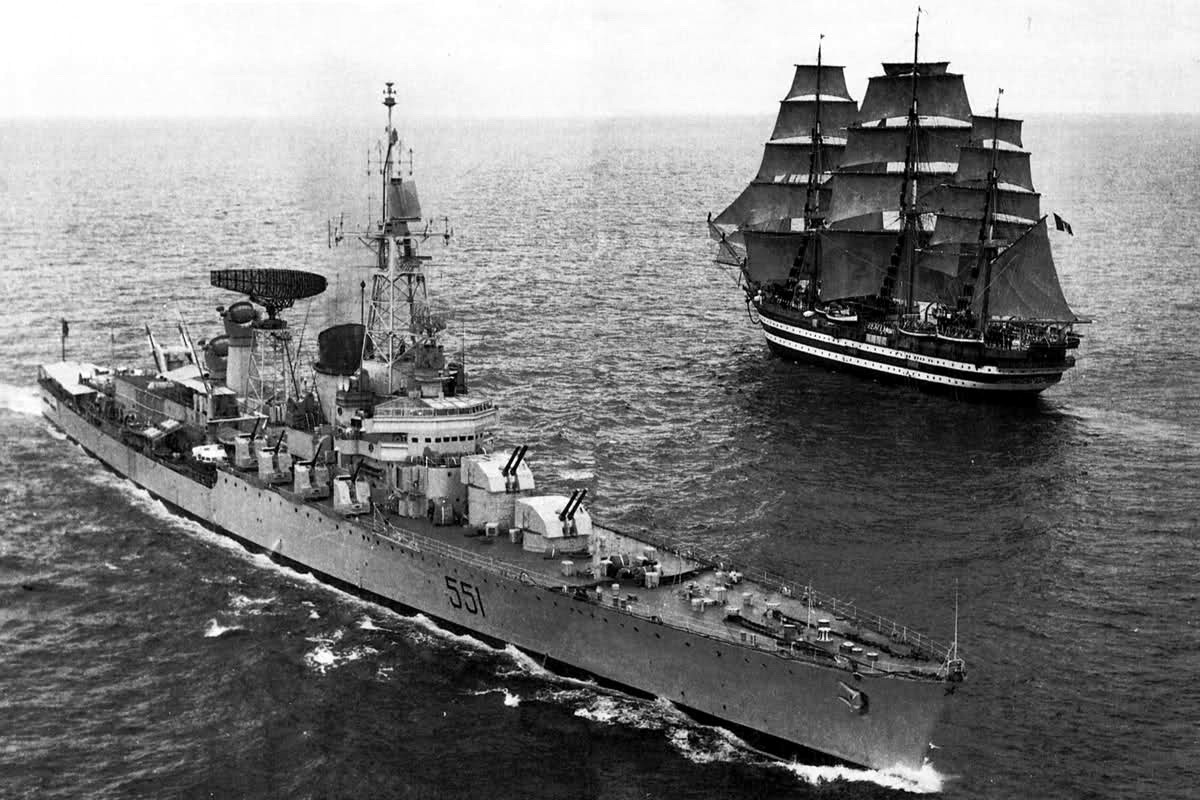
AN/SPS-39 aboard Giuseppe Garibaldi

=== On board ships ===
==== United States ====
- Kitty Hawk-class aircraft carrier
- Galveston-class cruiser
- Providence-class cruiser
- Boston-class cruiser
- Leahy-class cruiser
- Albany-class cruiser
- USS Atlanta
- Charles F. Adams-class destroyer
- Coontz-class destroyer
- Farragut-class destroyer
- Forrest Sherman-class destroyer
- Mitscher-class destroyer
- Brooke-class frigate
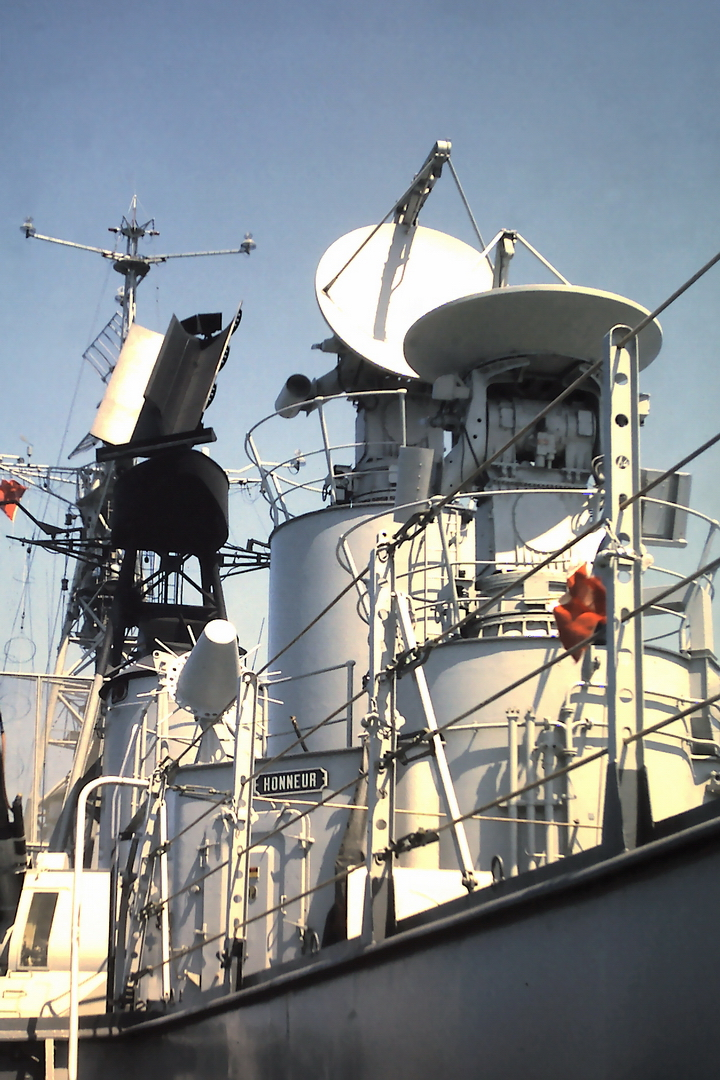
  AN/SPS-39 aboard Kersaint

==== Japan ====
- JDS Amatsukaze

==== Germany ====
- Lütjens-class destroyer

==== France ====
- T 47-class destroyer

==== Italy ====
- Andre Doria-class cruiser
- Vittorio Veneto
- Giuseppe Garibaldi
- Impavido-class destroyer

==== Netherlands ====
- De Zeven Provinciën-class cruiser

== See also ==
- List of radars
- List of military electronics of the United States
- Radar configurations and types
- Reflector (antenna)

== Bibliography ==
- Norman Friedman (2006). The Naval Institute Guide to World Naval Weapon Systems. Naval Institute Press. ISBN 9781557502629
- Self-Defense Force Equipment Yearbook 2006-2007. Asaun News Agency. ISBN 4-7509-1027-9
