= AN/SPS-43 =

Cold War-era US Navy early warning radar

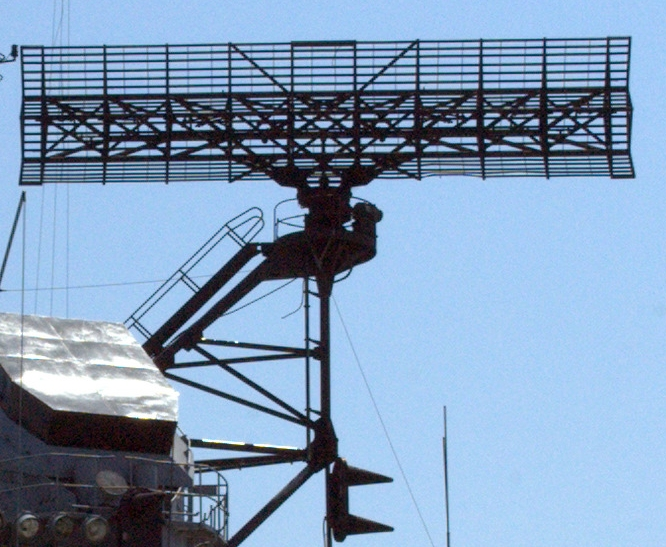
- SPS-43 radar aboard USS Hornet (CVS-12)
- Country of origin: United States
- Introduced: 1961
- No. built: 49
- Type: 2D Air-search
- Frequency: VHF; 0.2 GHz
- Range: 250 nmi (460 km)
- Diameter: 41 ft (12 m)
- Azimuth: 0-360°
- Power: 180 kW

The AN/SPS-43 was a long-range air-search United States Navy radar system introduced in March 1961 that had a range of 500+ km. This radar could provide bearing and distance information, but no altitude information. The small-ship antenna (AN/SPS-29) looked like a bedspring. Larger ships used the 12.8 m wide AN/SPS-37 antenna - about twice as wide and half the height of the SPS-29 antenna - and designed with a much narrower beam. Targets were much more accurately displayed when using the -37 antenna. The -43 operated at VHF frequency - somewhat unusual for any radar - mostly in the bandwidth of television channel 13. The main difference to the SPS-37 was the greatly improved ECCM performance, as the AN/SPS-43 could jump between 20 different frequencies to frustrate jamming attempts. A sea-skimming missile could be detected at a range distance of 30 km, a large high-flying aircraft at 500 km.

The SPS-43 also included MTI (Moving Target Indication) which enabled the operator to eliminate all stationary targets from his screen, but this was notoriously unreliable in practice given that it was, along with the rest of the electronics, entirely a vacuum-tube design. Vacuum tubes, operating at temperatures requiring cooling - or least properly ventilated cabinets - suffer varying temperatures in operation, so maintaining the constant output pulse leading edge - phase-coherency - (required for proper delay-line timing) was well-nigh impossible. Some operators took it upon themselves to bore a small hole in the front panel of the MTI timing cabinet through which to insert a screwdriver, enabling adjustment of a critical potentiometer without having to open and close the cabinet. This prevented the resulting heat loss and subsequent heat buildup which threw off all adjustments. Even this enterprising idea was of little help. SPS-43 MTIs went largely unused in regular operation.

Typically, the -43 would detect the range and bearing of a target at long range, the target would then be picked up by a 3-D radar such as the AN/SPS-30 (or later the AN/SPS-48), which, assuming the target to be hostile would present the target information to a fire-control radar like the AN/SPG-55. The -55 was a very directional radar that would lock on to a target, which then would cause a missile to launch and "ride the beam" to the target.

49 SPS-43 radars were produced and mostly installed on aircraft carriers and World War II-cruisers converted to guided missile cruisers. Also a few amphibious command ships received the radar. The last ship to be equipped with SPS-43 was USS Dwight D. Eisenhower (CVN-69).

U.S. Navy shipboard radar systems were maintained by the Navy Electronics Technician (Radar), or ETR.

The -43 radar system has been replaced by newer systems, such as the AN/SPS-49.

In accordance with the Joint Electronics Type Designation System (JETDS), the "AN/SPS-43" designation represents the 43rd design of an Army-Navy electronic device for surface ship search radar system. The JETDS system also now is used to name all Department of Defense electronic systems.

== On board ships ==
- Essex-class aircraft carriers
- Forrestal-class aircraft carriers
- Kitty Hawk-class aircraft carriers
- Midway-class aircraft carriers
- Nimitz-class aircraft carriers
- Albany-class cruisers
- Boston-class cruisers
- Galveston-class cruisers
- Providence-class cruisers
- USS Atlanta
- Guardian-class radar picket ships

== See also ==
- List of radars
- List of military electronics of the United States
