= Kitty Hawk-class aircraft carrier =

Class of U.S. supercarriers

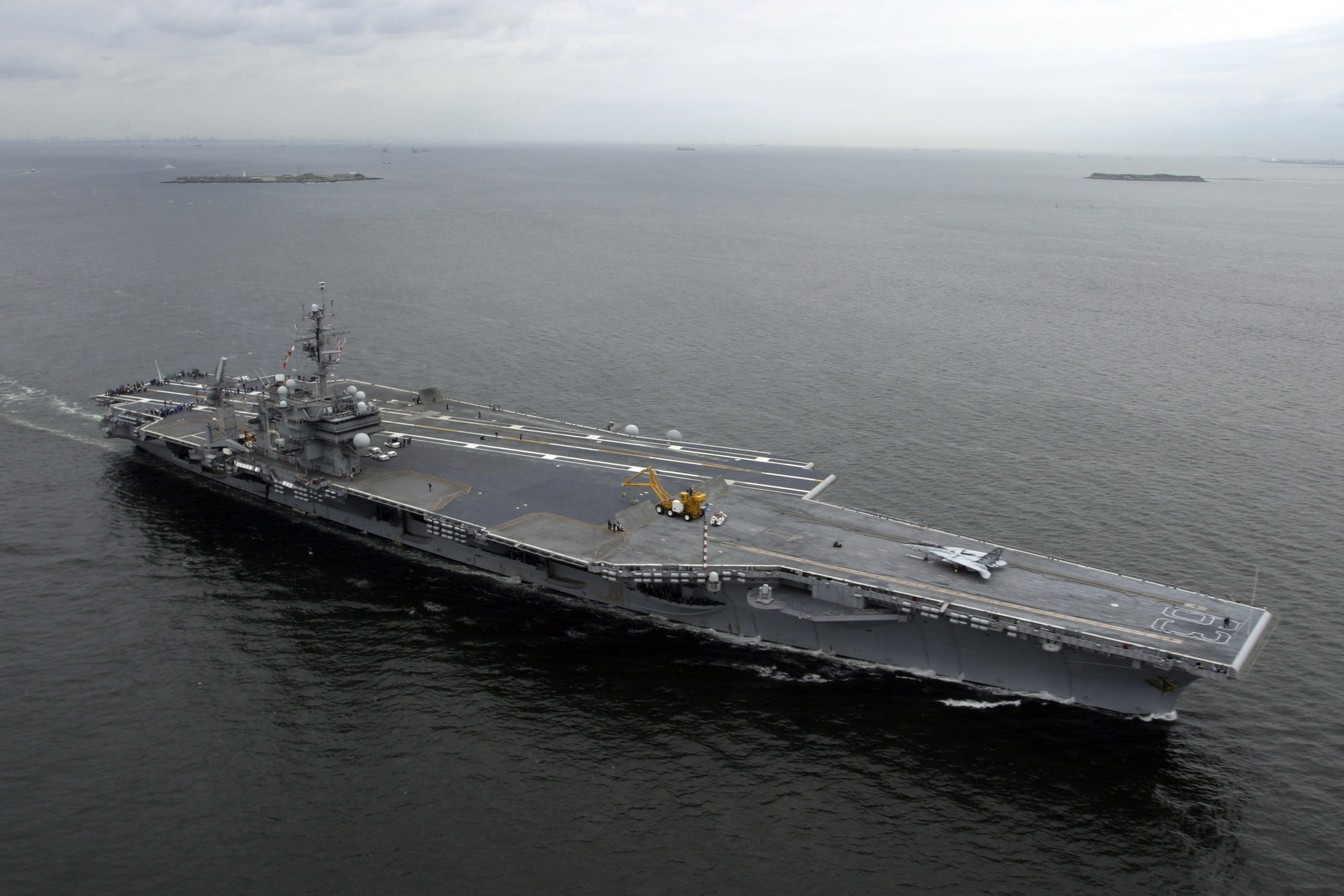
- USS Kitty Hawk conducting sea trials in the Western Pacific Ocean, May 2006

Class overview
- Name: Kitty Hawk class
- Builders: New York Shipbuilding; New York Navy Yard; Newport News Shipbuilding
- Operators: United States Navy
- Preceded by: Forrestal class
- Succeeded by: Enterprise class
- Subclasses: John F. Kennedy class (variant)
- In commission: 21 April 1961 – 31 January 2009
- Completed: 3 plus 1 variant
- Retired: 4

General characteristics
- Type: Aircraft carrier
- Displacement: 60,933 long tons (61,911 t) light; 81,780 long tons (83,090 t) full load
- Length: 1,069 ft (326 m) overall; 990 ft (300 m) waterline
- Beam: 130 ft (40 m) waterline; 252 ft (77 m) extreme
- Draft: 38 ft (12 m)
- Installed power: 280,000 shp (210 MW)
- Propulsion: 8 × steam boilers with Westinghouse geared steam turbines; 4 × shafts
- Speed: 32 kn (59 km/h; 37 mph)
- Range: 12,000 mi (19,000 km)
- Complement: 5,624
- Sensors & processing systems: 1 AN/SPG-55 (later removed); 1 AN/SPS-37; 1 AN/SPS-39; 1 AN/SPS-8
- Armament: Original armament: 2 × Mark 10 missile launchers for RIM-2 Terrier; Refit armament: 2–3 × 8 cell NATO Sea Sparrow Mark 29 missile launchers; 3–4 × 20 mm Phalanx CIWS; 2 × RIM-116 Rolling Airframe Missile launchers (USS Kitty Hawk only, replacing 1× Phalanx and 1× Mark 29)
- Aircraft carried: Up to 90 aircraft

The Kitty Hawk–class supercarriers of the United States Navy were an incremental improvement on the Forrestal-class vessels. Three were built, all in the 1960s, Kitty Hawk (CV-63) (1961–2009), Constellation (CV-64) (1961–2003), and America (CV-66) (1965–1996), as well as the variant John F. Kennedy (CV-67) (1967–2007).

The lead ship of the class, Kitty Hawk, was decommissioned in 2009, the last of the class to leave active service.

== Improved Forrestal carriers ==
The biggest differences from the Forrestals are greater length, and a different placement of elevators; two are forward of the island, one is aft of the island and another on the portside stern. The movement of the No. 4 elevator from the forward to the aft end of the angle made it useful for aircraft movement, since the forward-end elevator in the Forrestals was sited in both the landing path and in the launch path of the waist catapults.

Three different shipyards were used to construct the ships. Kitty Hawk was built at New York Shipbuilding Corporation, Constellation at New York Naval Shipyard, America and John F. Kennedy at Newport News Shipbuilding. John F. Kennedy is similar to the earlier units in flight deck arrangement and propulsion, but has enough differences that she is placed in her own class. Propulsion consisted of four Westinghouse geared turbines, 280,000 shaft horsepower (210,000 kW), four shafts with eight 1,200 pounds per square inch (8,300 kPa) Foster Wheeler boilers.

== Construction and design differences ==
The initial design for the class was known as SCB 127, and Kitty Hawk and Constellation were completed to design SCB 127A.

The first three units were constructed with a Terrier surface-to-air missile system. The supporting missile launchers and AN/SPG-55 radars consumed a large amount of space, while at the same time duplicating the capabilities of the air defence escorts, and were later removed. John F. Kennedy did not have Terrier and was built with the shorter ranged Sea Sparrow, Basic Point Defense Missile System (BPDMS). All were eventually equipped with NATO Sea Sparrow (NSSM) and Phalanx CIWS for self-defense. In 2001, Kitty Hawk received two Rolling Airframe Missile launchers replacing the forward Sea Sparrow and Phalanx CIWS equipment. The SLQ-32 Electronic Warfare Suite was added as part of the Service Life Extension Program (SLEP) on Kitty Hawk and Constellation.

America was designed under project SCB 127B and so had several differences from the lead units of the class. Instead of two forward anchors, one on each side, America had no port side anchor and an additional anchor astern, a change made to accommodate the AN/SQS-23 sonar. America was the only post-World War II U.S. carrier to be built with sonar, which was however removed in the early 1980s. She also had a narrow smokestack compared to prior units.

=== John F. Kennedy class ===
John F. Kennedy was originally scheduled to be the fourth Kitty Hawk-class carrier, but because she received so many modifications under project SCB 127C, she formed her own ship class and is often listed as a single-vessel class. Kennedy had similar design changes regarding the anchors to accommodate a sonar array, but the sonar was never installed. There was also a proposal to make her nuclear powered under competing project SCB 211A, but since Congress would not authorize it, Kennedy was constructed as a conventionally powered carrier. Her smokestack was also different and tilted outboard to send stack gas away from the flight deck. The angled end of the waist was also different from the other Kitty Hawks, bearing a closer resemblance to that of the Nimitz class. Kennedy was also 17 feet (5.2 m) shorter in length than the other Kitty Hawk-class carriers.

== Decommissioning ==
From 1987 to 1991 Kitty Hawk was overhauled for $785 million under the Service Life Extension Program (SLEP) at Philadelphia Naval Shipyard. From 1990 to 1992, Constellation received her $800 million service life extension also in Philadelphia. The program was intended to add 15 years to the life of the ships. John F. Kennedy was not overhauled as part of SLEP. Instead, from 1993 to 1995, she received a $491 million overhaul. It was the final project of Philadelphia Naval Shipyard prior to its closing. America had been scheduled to be overhauled under the service life extension program after Constellation, but she was decommissioned 9 August 1996 instead, during a time of budget cuts after the Cold War. America was in very poor condition when she was decommissioned, and therefore despite her historical significance was not held as a donation asset. She was expended as a live-fire target and sunk on 14 May 2005.

Constellation was decommissioned 7 August 2003. John F. Kennedy was decommissioned on 23 March 2007. Only Kitty Hawk remained in service as of early 2008 and was replaced by USS George Washington as the forward-deployed carrier in Japan. Kitty Hawk returned to the United States after the turnover. She was decommissioned on 12 May 2009.

== Ships in class ==
Name	Hull Number	Photo	Builder	Ordered	Laid Down	Launched	Commissioned	Decommissioned	Fate	Source
Kitty Hawk class
Kitty Hawk	CV-63		New York Shipbuilding Corporation, Camden, New Jersey	1 October 1955	27 December 1956	21 May 1960	29 April 1961	12 May 2009	Broken up at Brownsville, 2024	
Constellation	CV-64		New York Naval Shipyard, New York City	1 July 1956	14 September 1957	8 October 1960	27 October 1961	7 August 2003	Broken up at Brownsville, 2015	
America	CV-66		Newport News Shipbuilding, Newport News, Virginia	25 November 1960	9 January 1961	1 February 1964	23 January 1965	9 August 1996	Sunk as target, 14 May 2005	
John F. Kennedy class variant
John F. Kennedy	CV-67		Newport News Shipbuilding, Newport News, Virginia	30 April 1964	22 October 1964	27 May 1967	7 September 1968	23 March 2007	Undergoing scrapping	

== Gallery ==
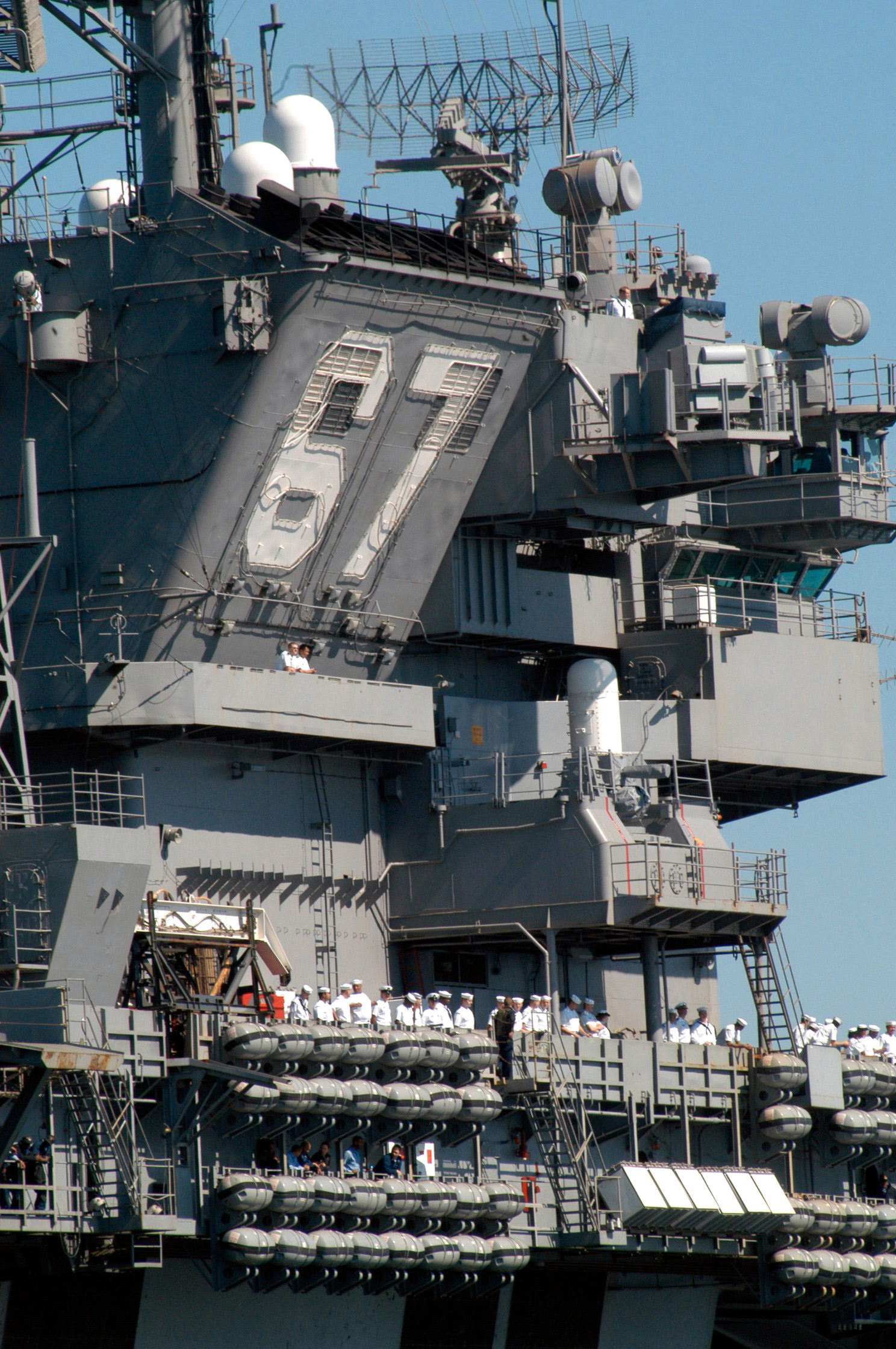
John F. Kennedy's smokestack tilts outboard to send stack gas away from the flight deck.

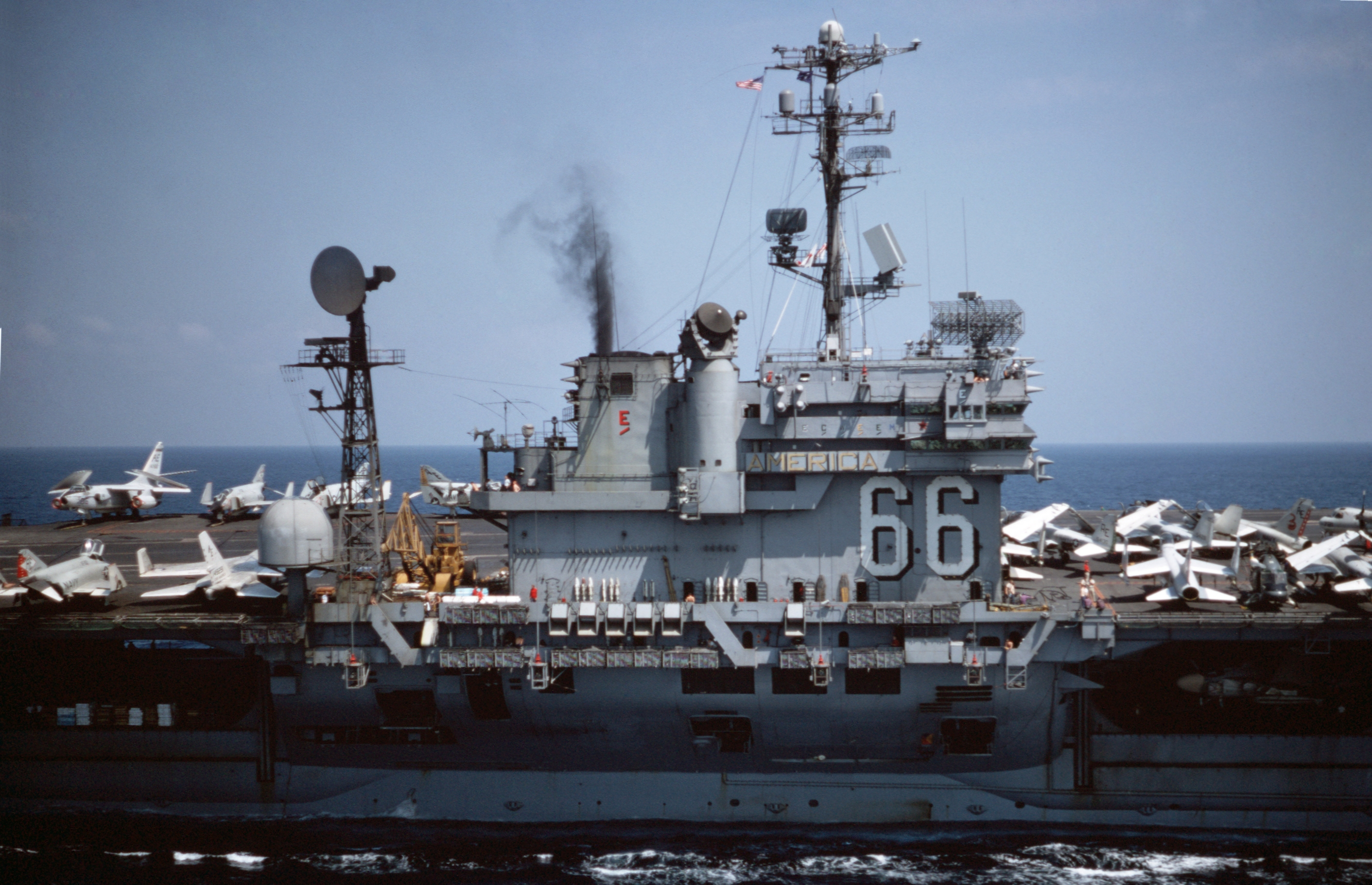
America's island in the mid 1970s, still equipped with AN/SPG-55 radar for Terrier.

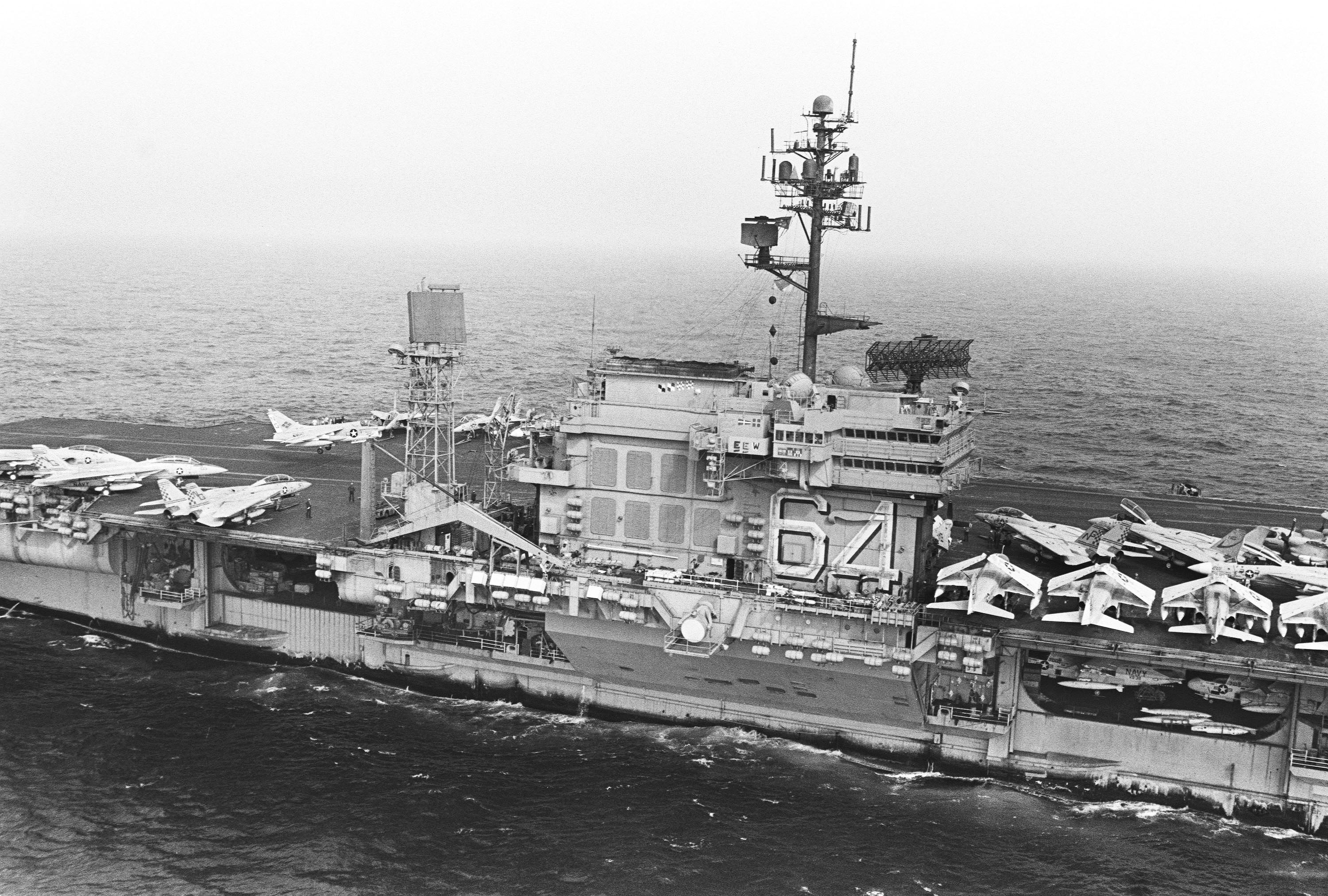
Constellation's island in the early 1980s, note the different stack configuration from America and John F. Kennedy and alternate mounting of Terrier fire control radars

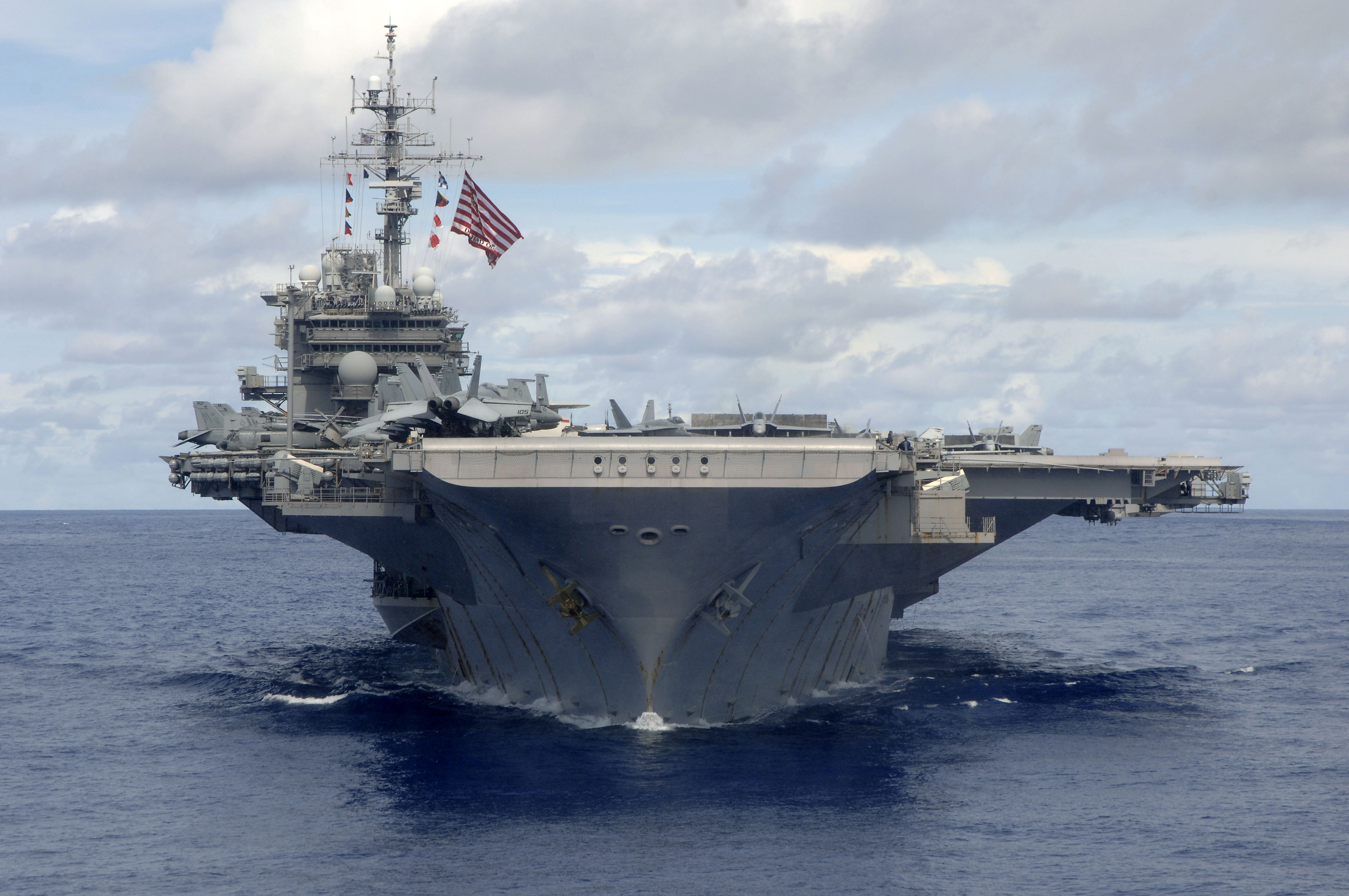
2007 bow view of Kitty Hawk. Note the position of forward anchors and Rolling Airframe Missile launchers on either side instead of CIWS and NSSM.

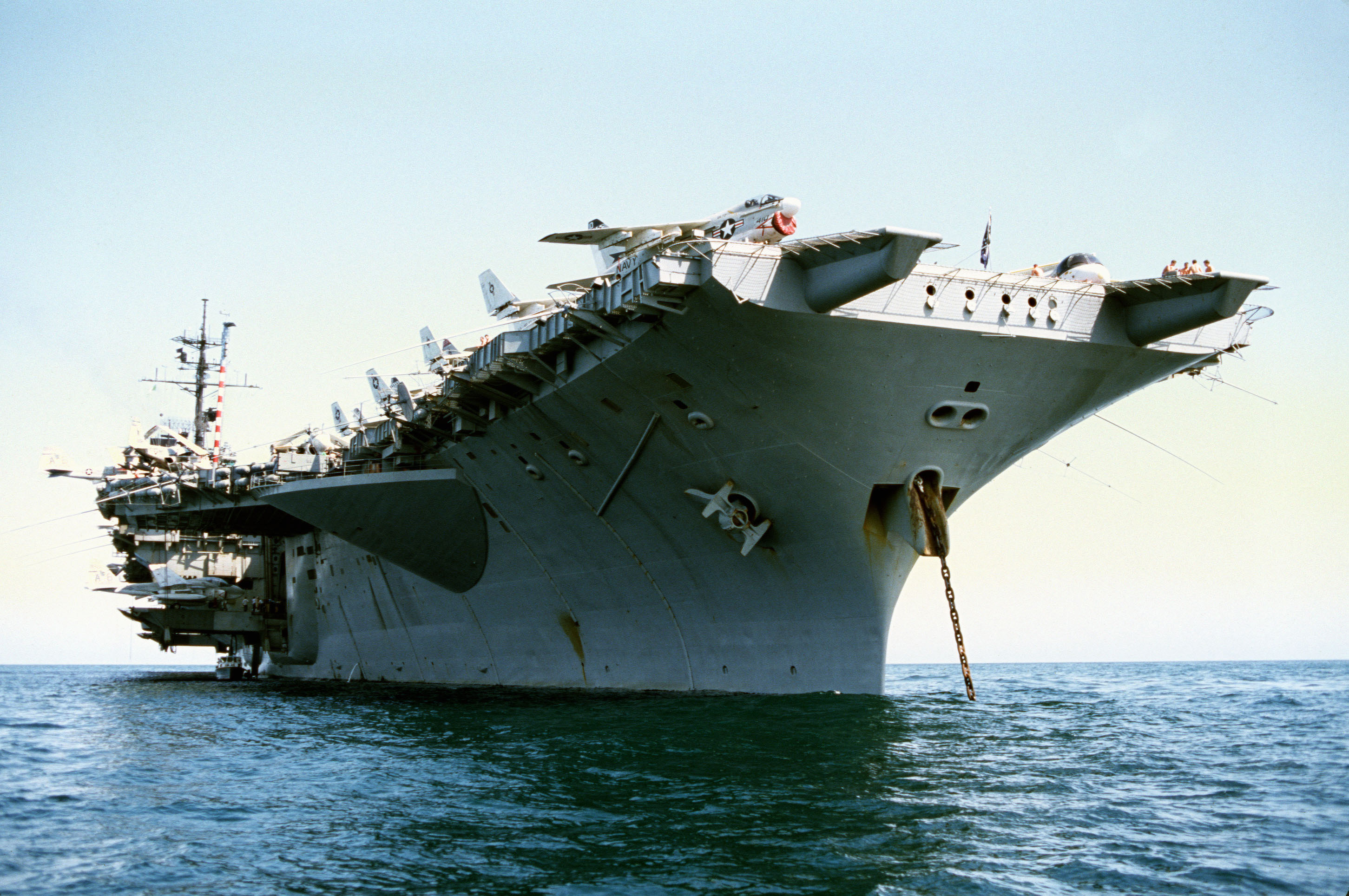
America showing bow anchor which previous units did not have.

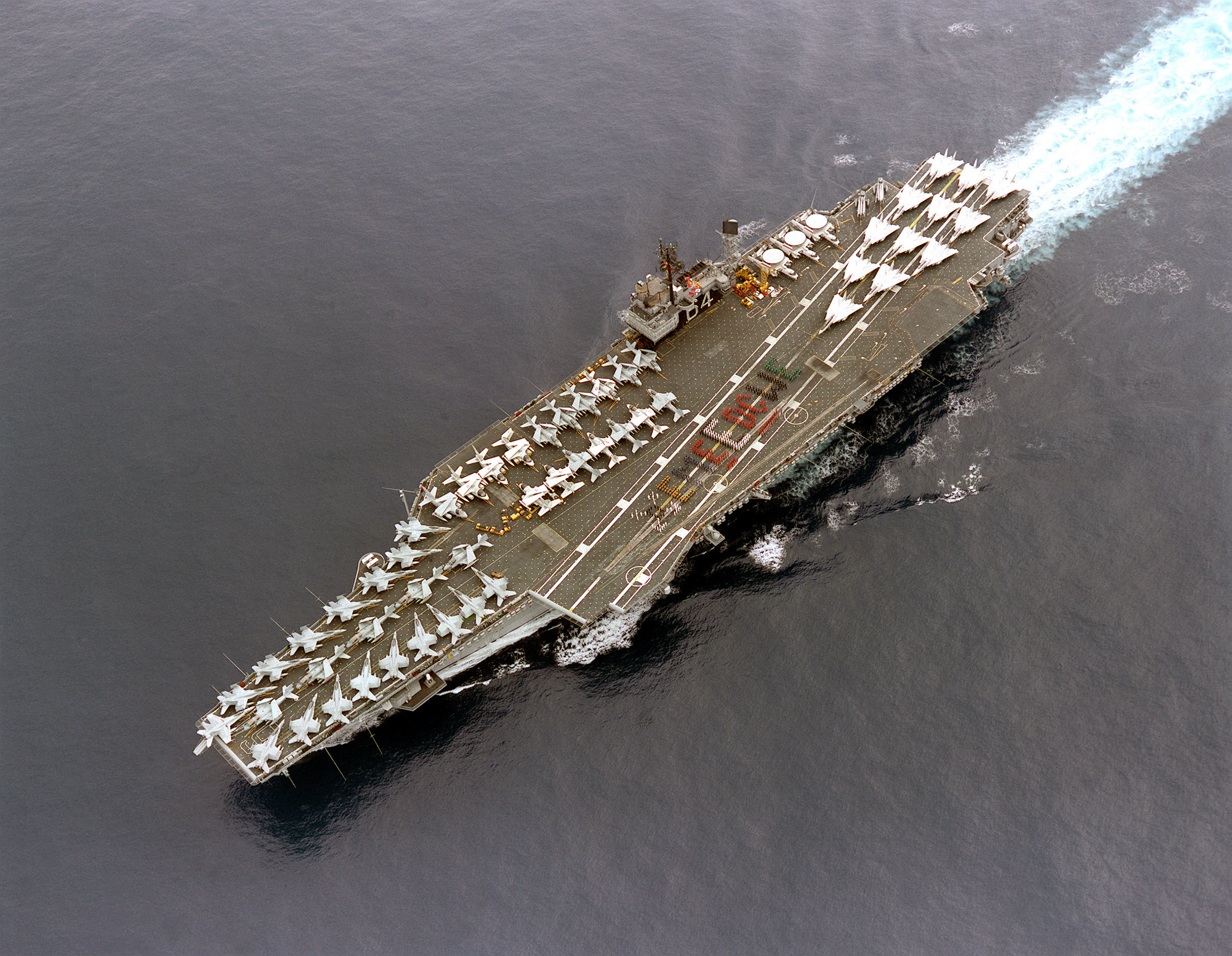
Aerial view of Constellation showing flightdeck shape and arrangement.

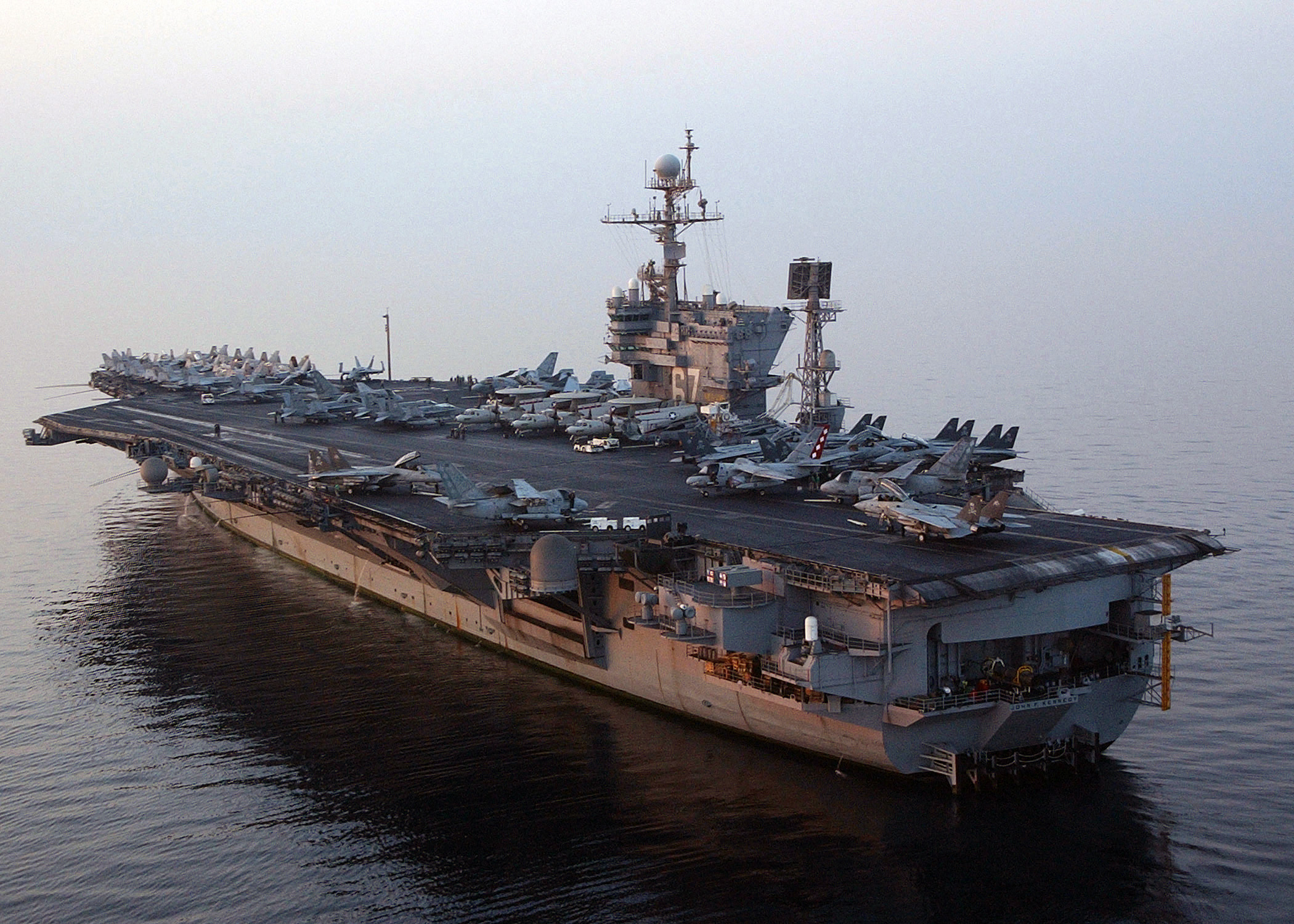
Stern view of the port side of John F. Kennedy showing the elevator and self-defense AAW equipment.

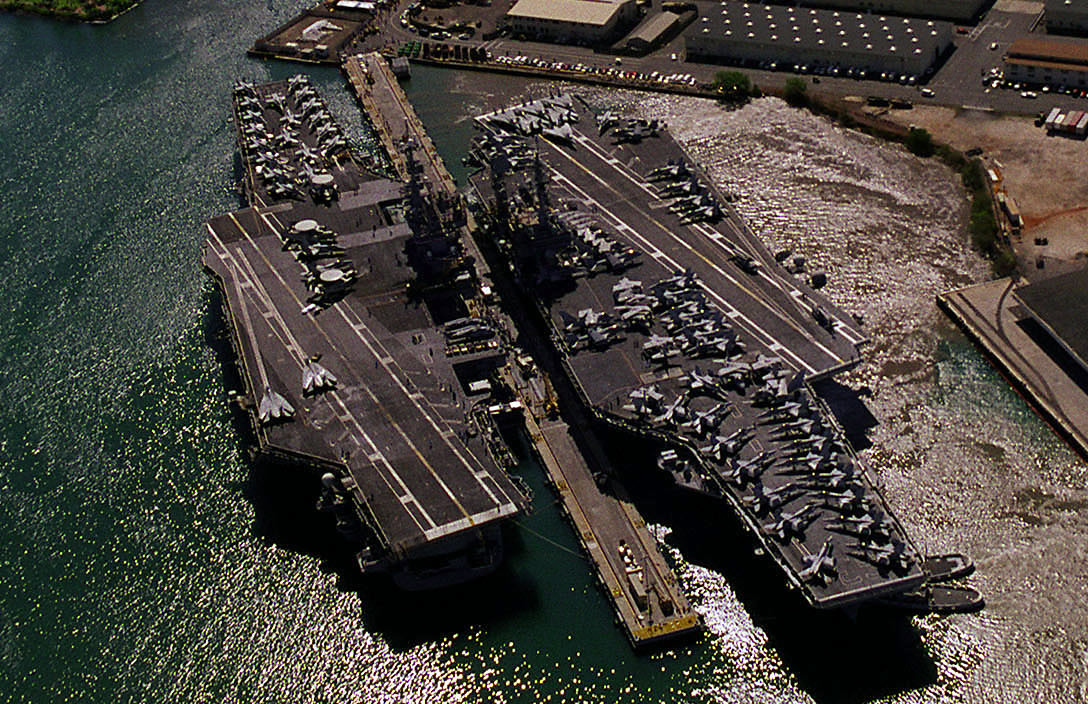
Independence, left, a Forrestal-class carrier next to Kitty Hawk (right)

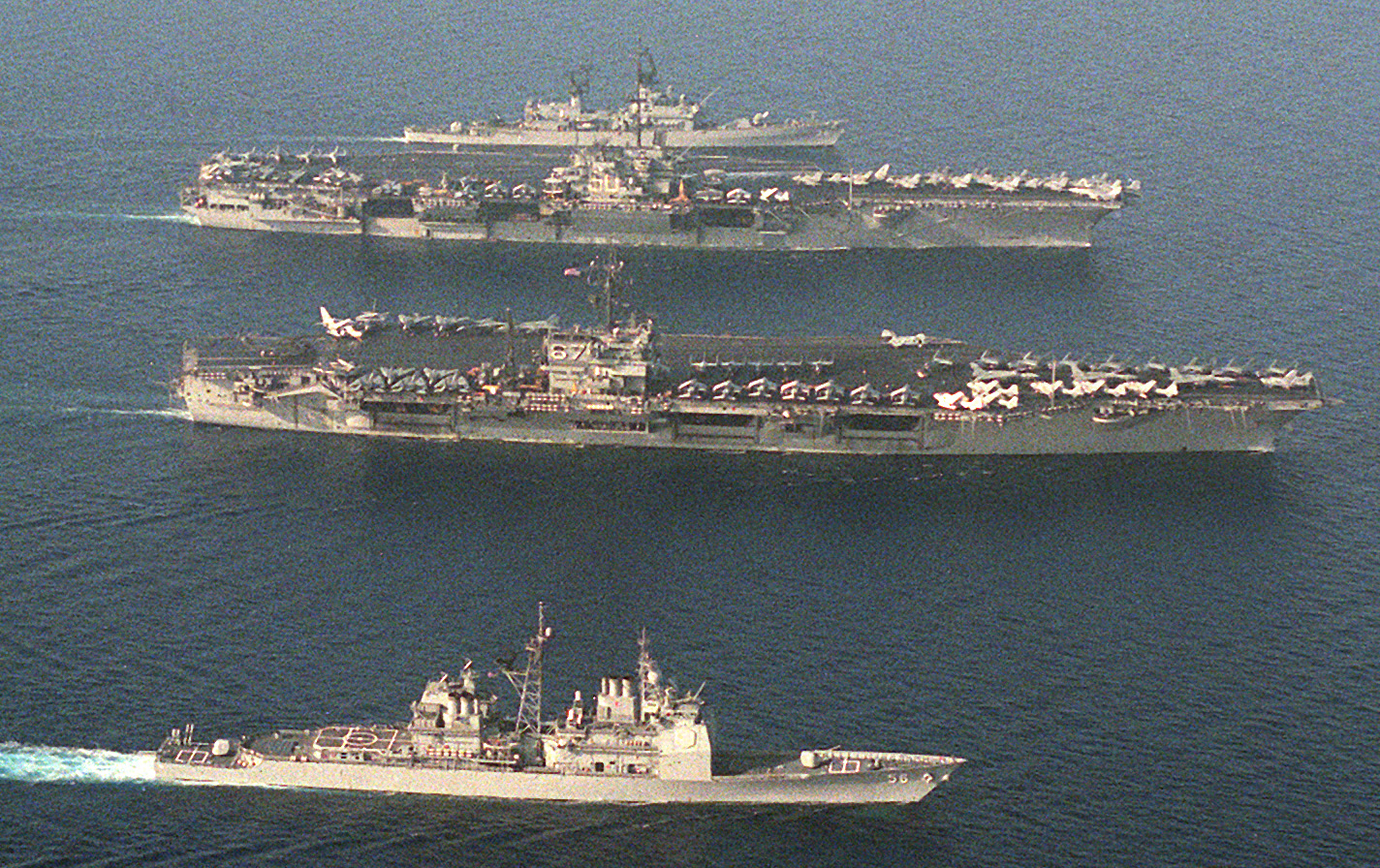
John F. Kennedy and Saratoga, a Forrestal-class carrier. Note the differences in island and aircraft elevator configuration.
