= AN/SPS-29 =

Naval two-dimensional early warning radar

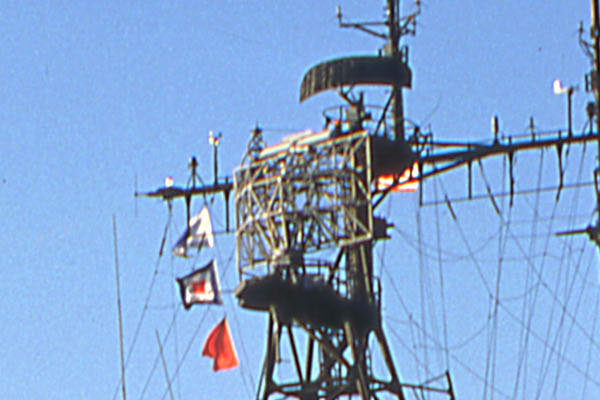
- AN/SPS-29 aboard a USS Mitscher
- Country of origin: United States
- Manufacturer: General Electric
- Introduced: October 1958
- No. built: 89
- Type: 2D
- Frequency: VHF Band
- PRF: 300 Hz
- Beamwidth: 20°
- Range: 500 km (270 nmi)
- Azimuth: Unlimited
- Power: 250 kW

AN/SPS-29 is a two-dimensional (giving only Range and Bearing) radar that was manufactured by General Electric. It was used by the US Navy as an early warning radar after World War II, and was equipped aboard naval ships during the Cold War. Variants include AN/SPS-29A, AN/SPS-29B, AN/SPS-29C, AN/SPS-29D and AN/SPS-29E. After modernization, it was redesignated as AN/SPS-37.

In accordance with the Joint Electronics Type Designation System (JETDS), the "AN/SPS-29" designation represents the 29th design of an Army-Navy electronic device for surface ship search radar system. The JETDS system also now is used to name all Department of Defense electronic systems.

== Development ==
During World War II, the U.S. Navy started with CXAM, which was commissioned in 1940, as an air search radar for large ships such as battleships and aircraft carriers. They have deployed radars that use bands (then called VHF).

In the 1950s, post-war generation radars using the same frequency band were required, and the AN/SPS-17 developed by General Electric was first adopted for large ships, and since 1957. Delivery has started. In addition, AN/SPS-28 developed by Westinghouse using the same antenna was also adopted for destroyers, and delivery began in the same year. However, although the antenna is common, the peak power of AN/SPS-17 was 750 kW (1.5 MW depending on the version), while that of AN/SPS-28 was 250 kW, which is a considerable difference. Therefore, it was inferior in detection ability. For this reason, this machine was developed with the goal of exhibiting the same weight as the AN/SPS-28 and the same performance as the AN/SPS-17.

=== Design ===
As the antenna, a mattress type is adopted like AN/SPS-28, and the dipole antennas are arranged in 7 rows x 4 stages, and the AS- with the antenna of the identification friend or foe (IFF) incorporated in the upper part. A 943 antenna was used. However, AN/SPS-29D uses a smaller antenna.

In AS-943, these dipole antennas were arranged at a distance of half the wavelength in the vertical and horizontal directions, and at a distance of one-fourth of the wavelength from the planar reflector. The beam width is 20 x 25.5 °, which is not much different from the AN/SPS-28's 19 x 27 °, but the pulse width is significantly longer from 4 microseconds to 10 microseconds. To compensate for this decrease in distance resolution, the number of pulse repetitions increased from 150 pps to 300 pps.

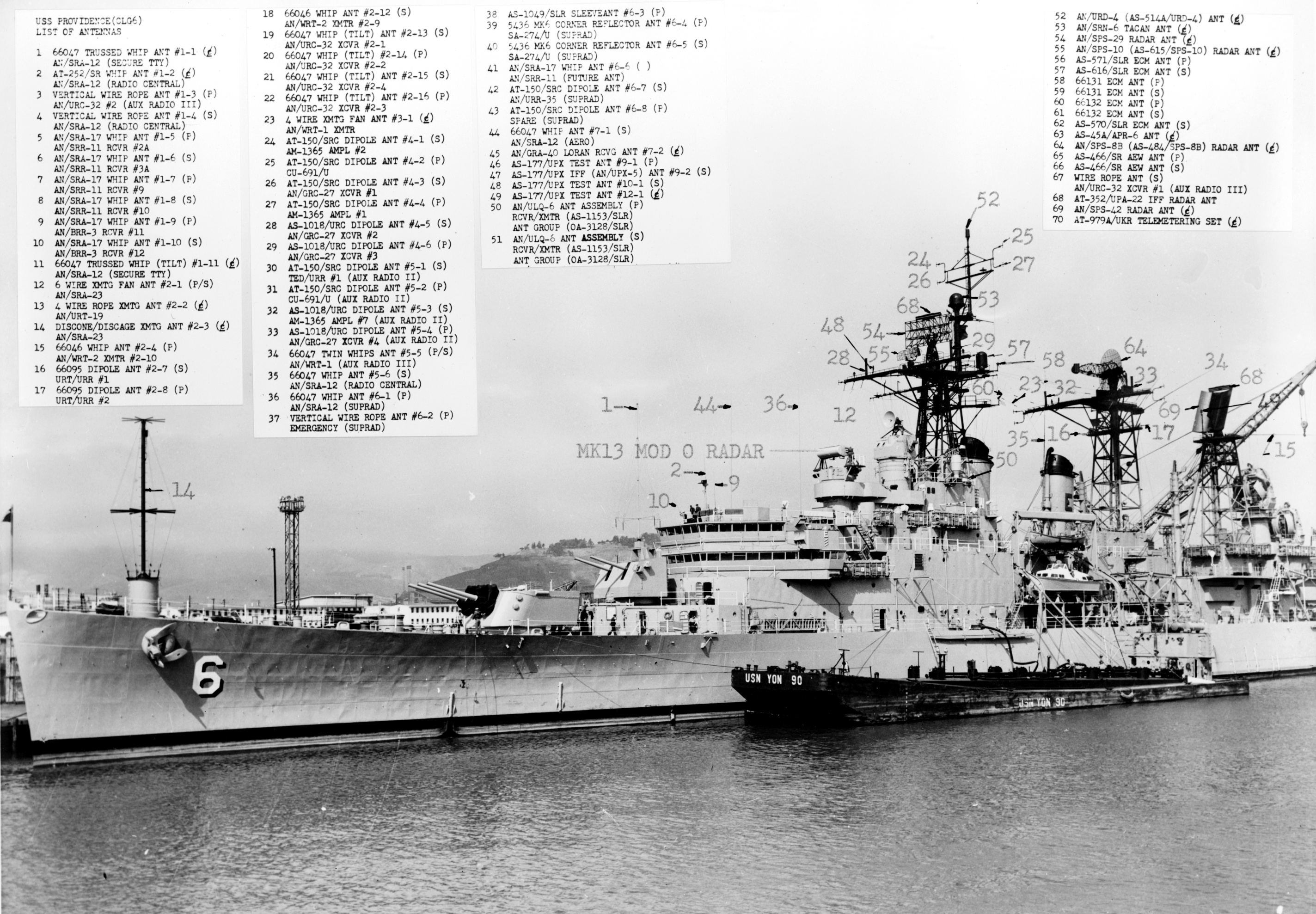
AN/SPS-29 aboard USS Providence

=== On board ships ===
==== United States ====
- Essex-class aircraft carrier
- Galveston-class cruiser
- Providence-class cruiser
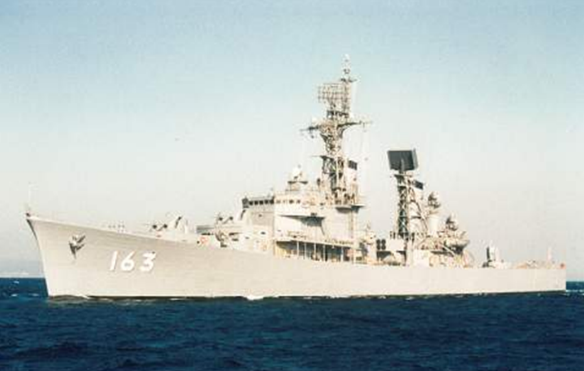
- AN/SPS-29 aboard JDS Amatsukaze
  USS Atalanta
- Charles F. Adams-class destroyer
- Coontz-class destroyer
- Farragut-class destroyer
- Forrest Sherman-class destroyer
- Mitscher-class destroyer
- Gearing-class destroyer (FRAM)
- Allen M. Sumner-class destroyer (FRAM)
- Fletcher-class destroyer (FRAM)
- Hamilton-class cutter
- Guardian-class radar picket ship

==== Japan ====
- JDS Amatsukaze

== AN/SPS-37 ==
This machine was continuously improved in the order of AN/SPS-29A, AN/SPS-29B, and AN/SPS-29C, and AN/SPS-29D with a smaller antenna was also manufactured for the United States Coast Guard.

It then evolved into AN/SPS-37, which introduced pulse compression technology, and AN/SPS-43, which had enhanced electronic protection capabilities. However, due to its long wavelength and low resolution, it was replaced by radar with shorter wavelengths than AN/SPS-40, and disappeared in the US Navy due to the retirement of the on board ship.

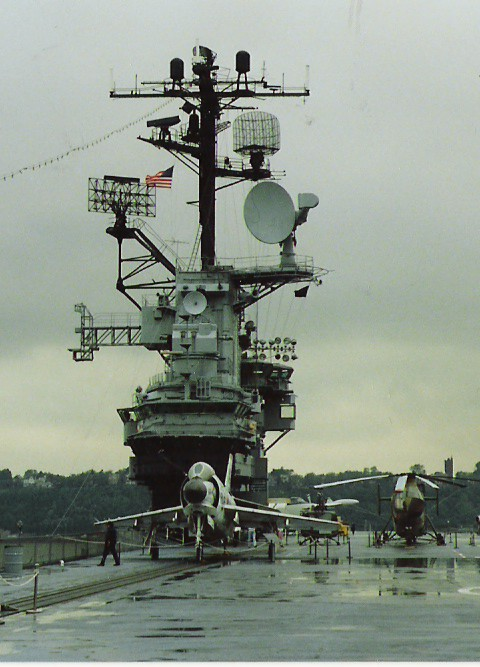
AN/SPS-37 aboard USS Intrepid

It was widely used overseas as well as on board ships (mainly Sumner-class / Gearing-class destroyers), but it also disappeared with the retirement of the onboard ships.

=== On board ships ===
==== United States ====
- Essex-class aircraft carrier
- Independence-class aircraft carrier
- USS Norfolk
- Baltimore-class cruiser
- Providence-class cruiser
- Forrest Sherman-class destroyer
- Mitscher-class destroyer
- Gearing-class destroyer (FRAM)
- Allen M. Sumner-class destroyer (FRAM)
- Fletcher-class destroyer (FRAM)
- Guardian-class radar picket ship

== See also ==
- List of radars
- List of military electronics of the United States
- Radar configurations and types
- Early warning radar

== Bibliography ==
- Norman Friedman (2006). The Naval Institute Guide to World Naval Weapon Systems. Naval Institute Press. ISBN 9781557502629
- Self-Defense Force Equipment Yearbook 2006-2007. Asaun News Agency. ISBN 4-7509-1027-9
