= AN/SPS-17 =

Cold War-era US Navy early warning radar

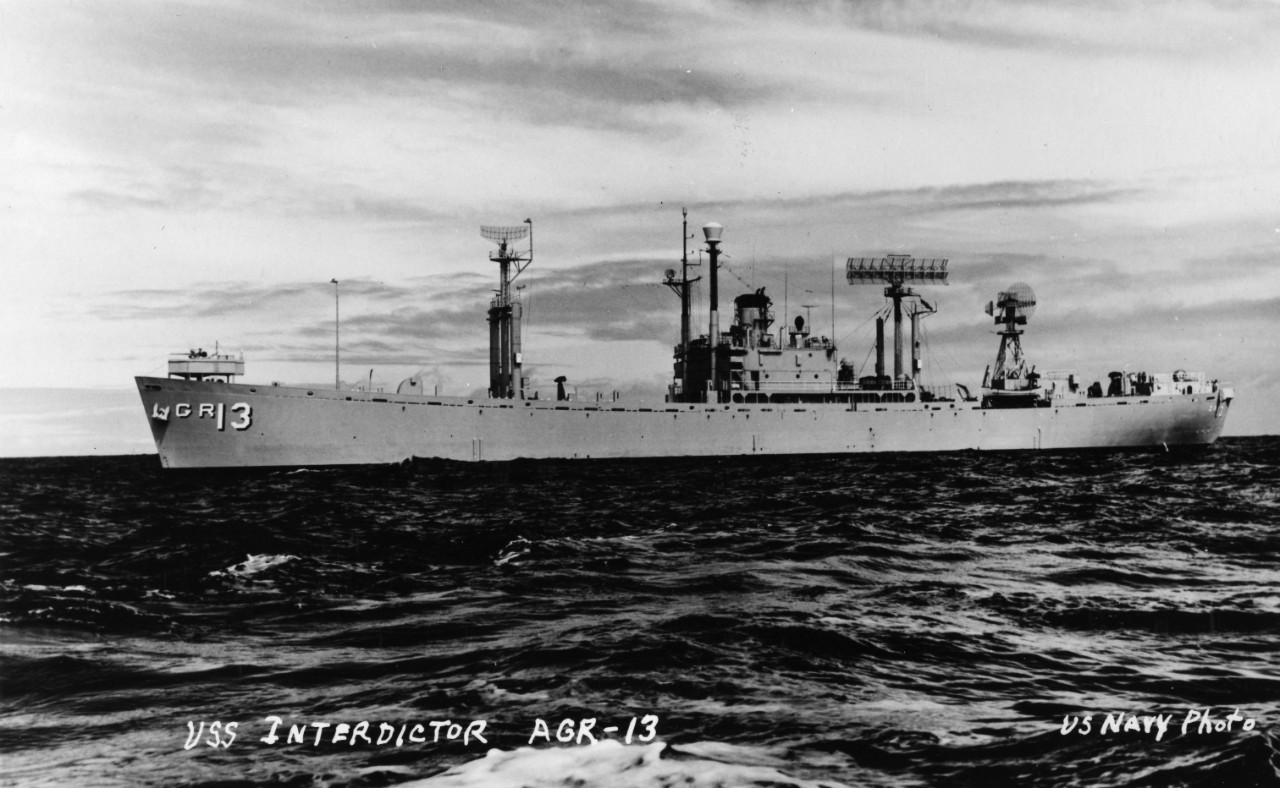
- Photograph of Guardian-class radar picket ship USS Interdictor while underway. AN/SPS-17 is the large "billboard" on the second radar mast from right.
- Country of origin: United States of America
- Manufacturer: General Electric and ITE Circuit Breaker Company
- Introduced: July 1957
- No. built: 20-22 (Note: Reports vary on precisely how many of these radars were produced. The NRL report notes 22 radars, Friedman reports 20.)
- Frequency: P-Band, 215-225 MHz
- PRF: 120 PPS
- Beamwidth: 18° (horizontal), 20° (vertical)
- Pulsewidth: 10 𝜇s
- RPM: 5-15 RPM
- Range: 200 nmi (370 km)
- Power: 1.5 MW
- Related: AN/SPS-29; AN/SPS-37; AN/SPS-43; AN/SPS-31; AN/SPS-40

The AN/SPS-17 is a long-range air-search radar developed for the United States Navy during the early Cold War, primarily used on the Guardian-class radar picket ship. It was the first major postwar P-band air search radar.

Although this radar set did not see widespread service in the U.S. Navy, it led to the development of several far more prolific radar systems, including the AN/SPS-29, the AN/SPS-37, the AN/SPS-43, and the AN/SPS-40. (Note: More specifically, a 75cm wavelength version was developed as the AN/SPS-31, which was a predecessor to the AN/SPS-40)

In accordance with the Joint Electronics Type Designation System (JETDS), the "AN/SPS-17" designation represents the 17th design of an Army-Navy electronic device for surface ship search radar system. The JETDS system also now is used to name all Department of Defense electronic systems.

== Design ==
The AN/SPS-17 was introduced to mitigate issues with the L-band air-search radars recently introduced to the Navy. Although radars in the L-band could have smaller antennas and better precision, they had trouble reliably picking up streamlined jet fighters at distance because of how the airframe scattered incoming radiation in the L-band. For example, the L-band SPS-6B could pick up a bomber at similar distances, but detection for a single jet could be as little as 180 nmi (330 km) with a fifty percent detection rate. In comparison, this radar could pick up bombers at 180 nmi (330 km) and, due to the characteristics of radio waves in the P-band, was not seriously effected by the shape of the incoming aircraft.

The tradeoff for better detection of smaller, streamlined aircraft at the lower frequency was poorer precision. With the 17.5 foot antenna, this radar was producing an 18.5° beam horizontally. In comparison, the AN/SPS-6B was achieving a beam 3° wide in the horizontal with an antenna 18 feet across. In addition, a long pulse was required to dump enough energy into a distant aircraft and pick up the reflection, which limited range precision.

== History ==
=== Background ===
In 1945, the Naval Research Laboratory made a study to determine the optimum frequency for shipboard radars, and it concluded that the maximum performance centered broadly in the L-band (approx. 1300 MHz) region. The higher frequency radars could use a smaller antenna for the same beam width. Furthermore, there were significant pressures to free up the 200 MHz band for use by civilian television, and the P-band radars of the early/mid war were interfering with VHF radio communications. Thus, subsequent air-search radars, including the SR, the AN/SPS-6, and the AN/SPS-12, were built in this frequency range.

There were, however, problems with the shift to the L-band for air search. Tests in 1949-1950 showed that, at the wavelengths involved for L-band, the returning signal was made up of reflections from individual aircraft surfaces. This made picking up "clean" jet aircraft difficult, for the streamlined designs had fewer corners to reflect the signal strongly compared to earlier propeller aircraft. In addition, the L-band was more subject to atmospheric effects, or "trapping", which confined the transmitted and reflected energy to lower altitudes. For example, the destroyer USS Radford (DD-446) could detect a B-29 Superfortress with her AN/SPS-6B at 20,000 ft (6,100 m) from 180 nmi (330 km) away, but this figure drops to 55 nmi (102 km) for a single jet at 12,000 ft (3,700 m), and the detection probability for the single jet was 50 percent at those distances. The NRL's decision to continue development of P-band systems was a reflection of these shortcomings.

Development of the AN/SPS-17 occurred at the Navy Research Laboratory between from 1950 to 1956. The first prototype, which used parts from the earlier SR radar, was tested 1952–53. The second prototype was tested aboard the Willis A. Lee in February–April 1957. Twenty were ordered in 1956, and the radar was installed on board the Guardian-class radar picket ships, which were converted from surplus Liberty ship hulls between 1954 and 1958. Further production was made redundant with the introduction of the AN/SPS-29.

=== Further development ===
The specified antenna size of the base-model AN/SPS-17 was intended to permit installation on a destroyer, but in practice the radar was too heavy for such an installation to take place. Thus, the AN/SPS-28 was developed as a lightweight counterpart for destroyers. This radar system used the SPS-17 antenna with a less powerful transmitter capable of producing 250 kW and had a reliable range of 100 nmi (190 km). It was first delivered January 1957, and 55 were produced for destroyers and DERs.

In October 1958, the AN/SPS-29 was introduced. This radar set achieved the performance of the SPS-17 on the footprint of the AN/SPS-28, and saw far more widespread deployment aboard surface ships. A total of 89 were produced. This radar set would be developed further as the AN/SPS-37 and the AN/SPS-43.

Another version of the SPS-17, operating instead on the 400-MHz band, was developed, eventually becoming the AN/SPS-31, a developmental model, which in turn lead to the AN/SPS-40

== Variants ==
- AN/SPS-17: Baseline version.
- AN/SPS-17A: Large antenna version. Developed for radar picket ships.

== Platforms ==
- Guardian-class radar picket ship
- USS Little Rock (CLG-4) (Note: Radar choices appear to have varied between within the Galveston-class. The USS Little Rock was built as a "flagship" and thus had a markedly different configuration from the other two Galvestons in general. The other two ships in this class did not have the SPS-17. Reports vary on whether the "flagship" version of the Providence-class, the Springfield, had the SPS-17.)

== See also ==
- AN/SPS-29
- AN/SPS-43
- List of radars
- List of military electronics of the United States
