= Providence-class cruiser =

Class of American warships (1959–1974)

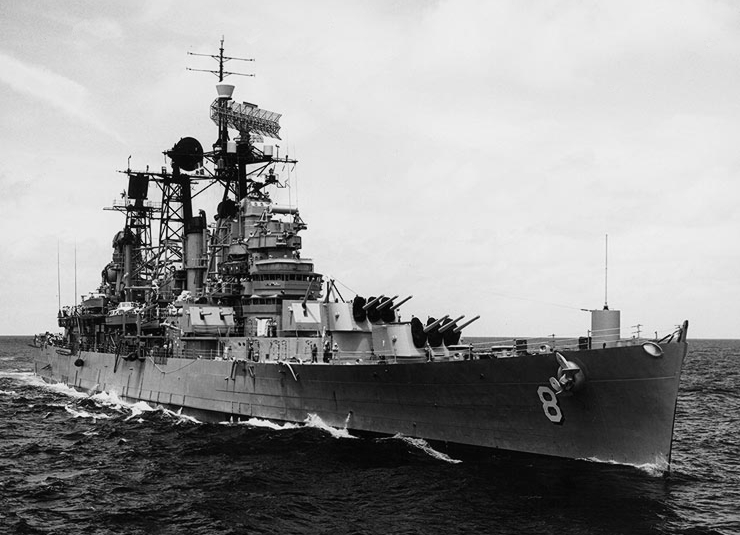
- USS Topeka in 1964

Class overview
- Operators: United States Navy
- Preceded by: Galveston class
- Succeeded by: Long Beach
- Subclasses: Cleveland class
- In commission: 1959–1974
- Completed: 3
- Retired: 3
- Scrapped: 3

General characteristics
- Type: Guided missile cruiser
- Displacement: 15,025 tons
- Length: 608 ft (185.3 m)
- Beam: 64 ft (19.5 m)
- Draft: 23 ft 6 in (7.1 m)
- Propulsion: 4 634 psi boilers; steam turbines; 4 shafts; 100,000 shp
- Speed: 32.5 knots (60 km/h)
- Complement: 1,120 officers and enlisted
- Sensors & processing systems: Providence and Springfield: AN/SPS-8B height-finding radar; AN/SPS-10 surface-search radar; AN/SPS-29 early-warning radar; AN/SPG-49 fire-control radar; AN/SPS-42 reflector antenna; AN/SRN-6 TACAN; AN/URD-4 direction finder antenna; Topeka: AN/SPS-10 surface-search radar; AN/SPS-30 height-finding radar; AN/SPS-43 air-search radar; AN/SPG-49 fire-control radar]; AN/SPS-42 reflector antenna; AN/SRN-6 TACAN
- Armament: Providence and Springfield: 1 × triple 6-inch/47-caliber gun; 1 × dual 5"/38 caliber guns; 1 × dual Mark 9 RIM-2 Terrier missile launcher; Topeka: 2 × triple 6"/47 cal guns; 3 × dual 5"/38 cal guns; 1 × dual Mark 9 RIM-2 Terrier missile launcher
- Aviation facilities: Helipad

Originally built as Cleveland-class light cruisers (CL) in the United States Navy during World War II, in 1957 three ships were re-designated as Providence-class guided missile light cruisers (CLG) and fitted with the Terrier surface-to-air missile system. During the two year refit under project SCB 146, the aft superstructure was completely replaced and all aft guns were removed to make room for the twin-arm Terrier launcher and a 120 missile storage magazine. Three large masts were also installed in order to hold a variety of radars, missile guidance, and communications systems. Providence and Springfield were simultaneously converted into fleet flagships under SCB 146A, which involved removing two forward dual 5-inch (127 mm) and one triple 6-inch (152 mm) turrets, and replacing them with a massively rebuilt and expanded forward superstructure. Topeka, in the non-flagship configuration, retained the Cleveland-class's standard forward weapons: three dual 5-inch (127 mm) and two triple 6-inch (152 mm) turrets.

A similar pattern was followed in converting three other Cleveland-class ships (Galveston, Little Rock, and Oklahoma City) to operate the Talos surface-to-air missile system, creating the Galveston class. Little Rock and Oklahoma City were outfitted as fleet flagships, but Galveston was not.

Like the Galveston class cruisers, the Providence class ships suffered from serious stability problems caused by the topweight of the missile system, requiring the use of ballast to improve stability. The cruisers also suffered from hogging of the hull.

All three Providence-class ships were decommissioned to the reserve fleet between 1969 and 1974. In the 1975 cruiser realignment, Providence and Springfield were reclassified as guided missile cruisers (CG). The ships were stricken from the Naval Vessel Register between 1974 and 1980, and eventually sold for scrap.

== Ships in class ==
Ship Name	Hull No.	Converted at	Laid down	Launched	Commissioned	Decommissioned	Fate
Providence	CLG-6	Boston Naval Shipyard	27 July 1943	28 December 1944	15 September 1959	31 August 1973	Sold for scrap, 15 July 1980
Springfield	CLG-7	Fore River Shipyard	13 February 1943	9 March 1944	2 July 1960	15 May 1974	Sold for scrap, 1 March 1980
Topeka	CLG-8	New York Naval Shipyard	21 April 1943	19 August 1944	26 March 1960	5 June 1969	Sold for scrap, 20 March 1975

== See also ==
- List of cruisers of the United States Navy
