= AN/SPS-8 =

Cold War-era US Navy height-finding radar

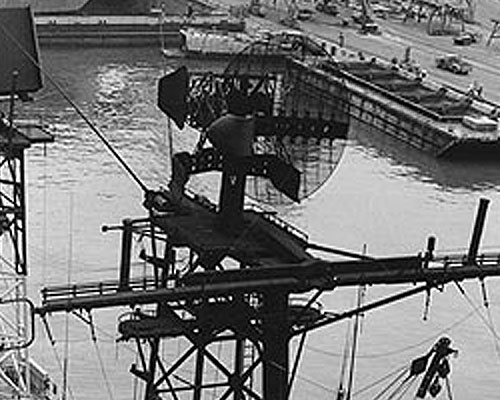
- AN/SPS-8B aboard the USS Providence
- Country of origin: United States
- Manufacturer: General Electric
- Introduced: 1952
- No. built: 101
- Type: Height finding radar
- Frequency: 3430-3550MHz, S Band
- PRF: 500-1000Hz
- Beamwidth: 3.5° (Horizontal), 1.1° (Vertical)
- Pulsewidth: variable, 1 or 2 µs
- Range: 111 km (60 nmi)
- Power: 650 kW

AN/SPS-8 is a two-dimensional radar manufactured by General Electric. It was used by the US Navy as a height finding radar after World War II, and was equipped aboard naval ships during the Cold War. Variants include AN/SPS-8A, AN-SPS/8B, AN/SPS-8C and AN/SPS-8D After modernization, it was redesignated as AN/SPS-30.

In accordance with the Joint Electronics Type Designation System (JETDS), the "AN/SPS-8" designation represents the 8th design of an Army-Navy electronic device for surface ship search radar system. The JETDS system also now is used to name all Department of Defense electronic systems.

== AN/SPS-8 ==
The AN/SPS-8 was created from the Model SX height-finding system by removing the search functionality. The introduction of the AN/SPA-8 series of plan position indicator with their correlated range-height displays made it feasible to use other search radars onboard the ship for azimuth information.

It worked in two modes in terms of range - with a pulse frequency of 1000 Hz (pulse duration 1 μs, range 154 km) and 500 Hz (2 μs, 308 km). In a real situation, the F2H aircraft was detected at a distance of 111 km (SPS-8A / B modifications - 133 km).

The target elevation angle was determined by scanning the beam in the vertical plane with a frequency of 5, 10 or 20 Hz (in the SPS-8B modification -6, 12 and 16.5 Hz). The accuracy of determining the height was 150 m. The deflection of the beam in elevation was carried out by a Robinson Scanner feed in modifications SPS-8 and SPS-8A and an organ-type feed in modification SPS-8B

In the SPS-8A modification, the capacity was increased from 650 kW to 1 MW with a design capacity of 2 MW. In the 2-μs pulse mode, pulse repetition rates of 450 and 750 Hz were provided.

The SPS-8 and SPS-8A used the same mesh antennas. SPS-8B, first tested in January–June 1956 and put into service in 1959, had a high gain antenna (41 instead of 37.4 dB), a narrower beam (1.2 ° × 1.5 °) wider scanning sector in elevation (12 °) at a vertical scanning frequency of 6, 12 and 16.5 Hz.

The information was displayed on the VK circular view indicator (Model VK Plan Position Indicator) and the VL range-height indicator (Model VL Range-Height Indicator).

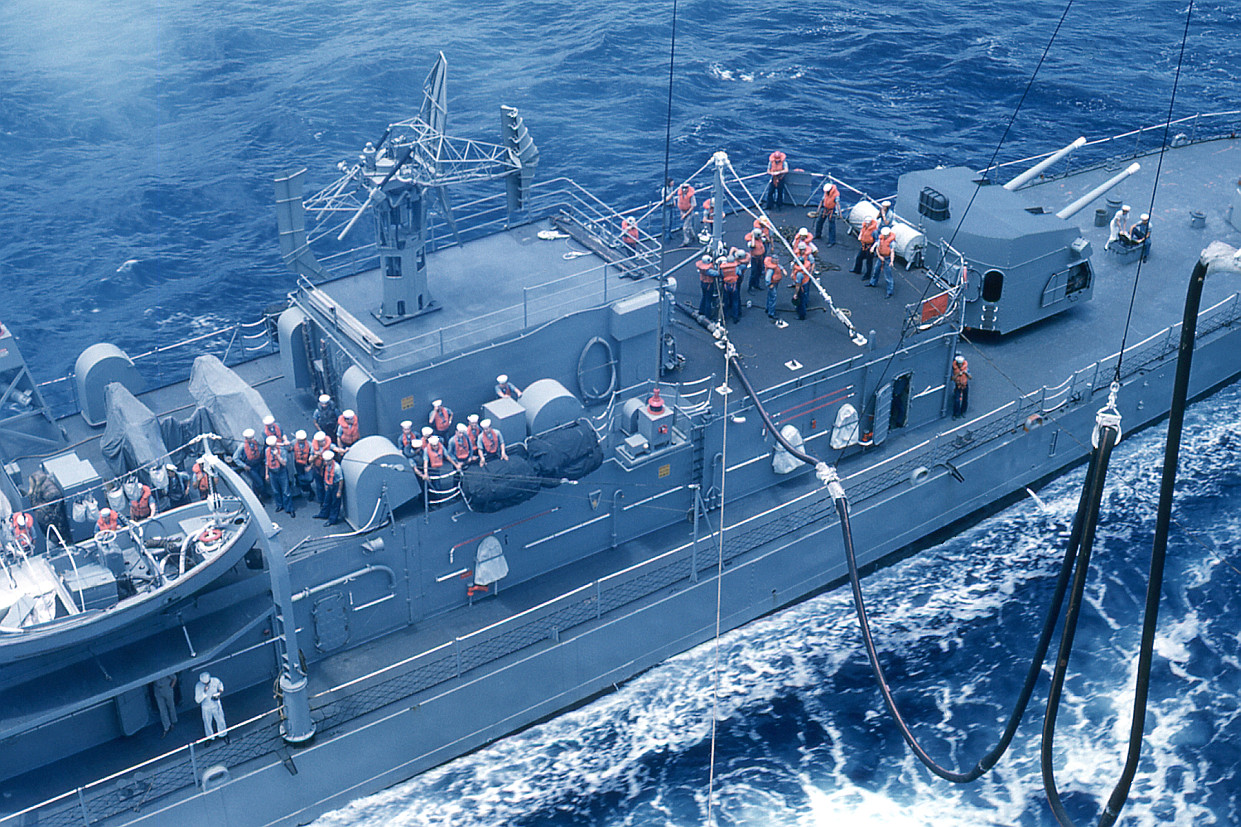
AN/SPS-8A aboard USS Goodrich

=== On board ships ===
==== United States ====
- Essex-class aircraft carrier

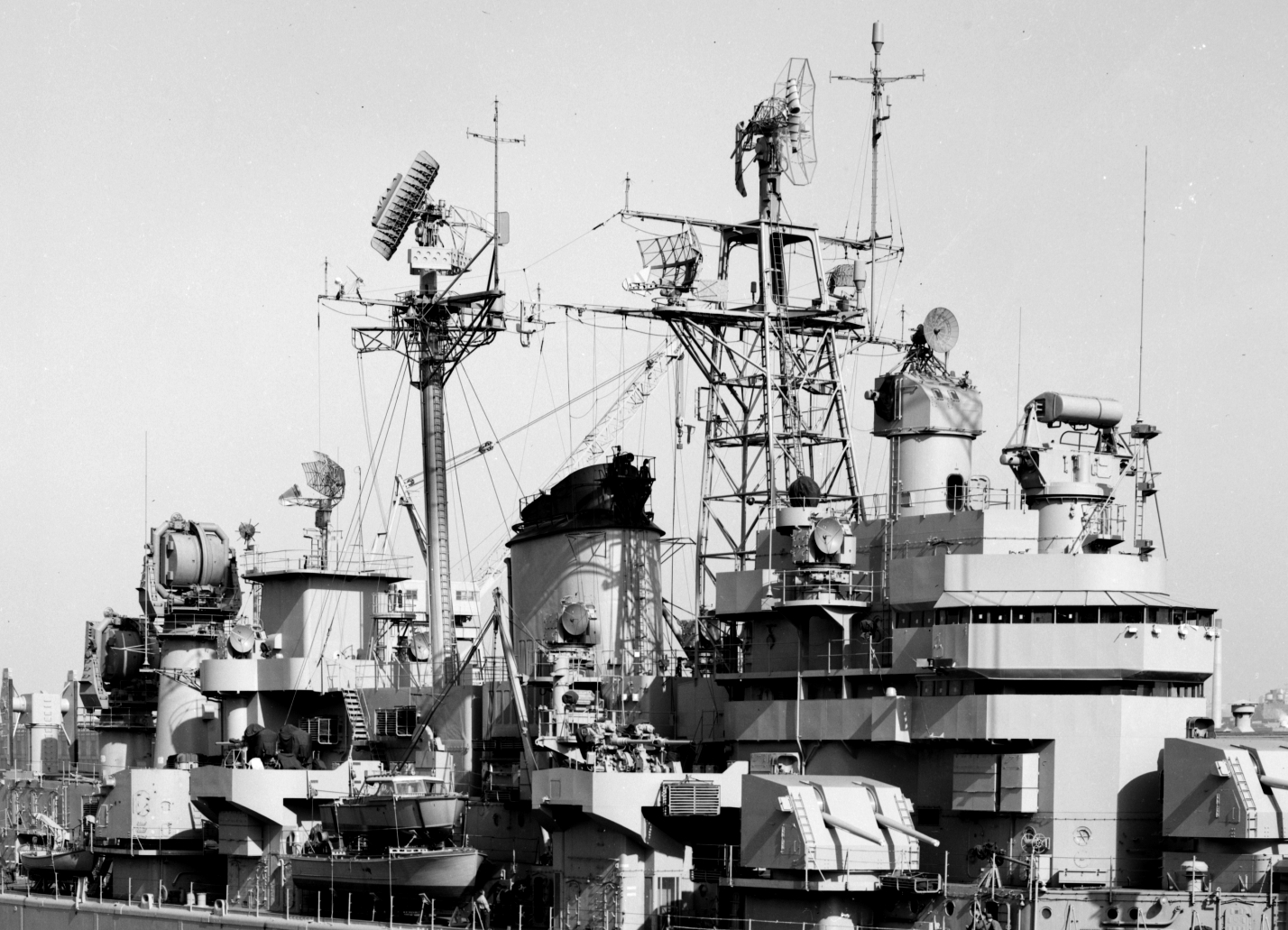
AN/SPS-8A aboard USS Canberra

- Midway-class aircraft carrier
- Forrestal-class aircraft carrier
- Independence-class aircraft carrier
- Iowa-class battleship
- Baltimore-class cruiser
- Worcester-class cruiser
- Boston-class cruiser
- Providence-class cruiser
- Galveston-class cruiser
- Mitscher-class destroyer
- Gearing-class destroyer
- Edsall-class destroyer escort
- Guardian-class radar picket ship
- USS Mississippi (BB-41) - Conducted AN/SPS-8B testing January—June 1956.
- USS Des Moines (CA-134)
- USS Northampton (CLC-1)

==== Brazil ====
- NAeL Minas Gerais - AN/SPS-8B

==== Canada ====
- HMCS Bonaventure (CVL-22)

==== Japan ====
- JDS Wakaba (DE-261) - AN/SPS-8B

==== Spain ====
- Dédalo (PH-01) - AN/SPS-8B

== AN/SPS-30 ==
Based on the SPS-8B, the best American sweeping beam radar, the SPS-30, was created, which used a high gain antenna and a 2.5 MW klystron. Work on its creation began in 1956. It is a three-dimensional radar.

It was planned to upgrade the SPS-8 and SPS-8A to SPS-8C / D with the installation of the same antennas and klystrons as on the SPS-30, but these plans were not implemented, although at the end of 1957, 30 new antennas were produced.

A modification of the SPS-8 was the CXRX radar,

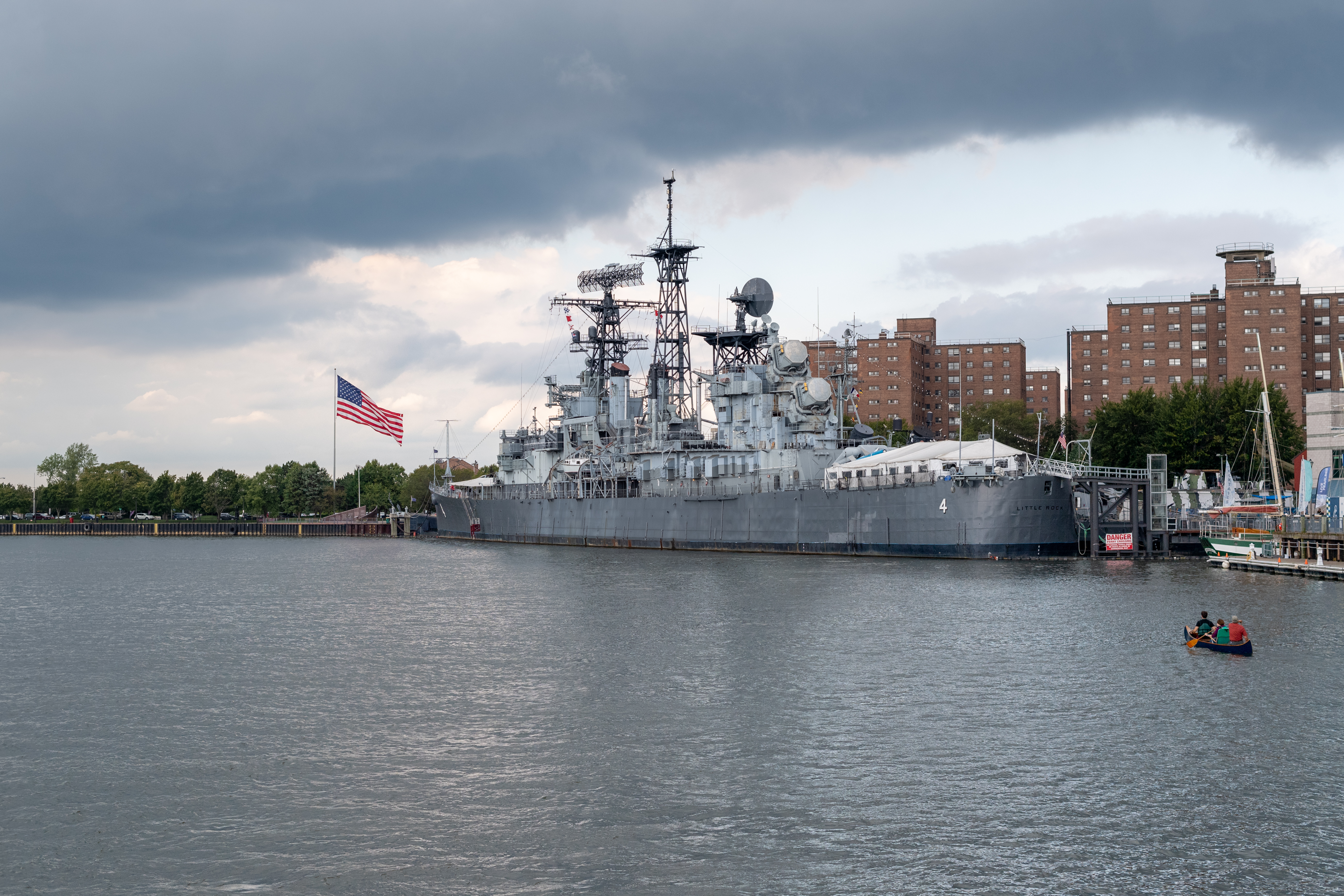
AN/SPS-30 aboard USS Little Rock

AN/SPS-30 Radar onboard USS Galveston (CLG-3), 1968-05-17 (cropped)

=== On board ships ===
==== United States ====
- Essex-class aircraft carrier
- Boston-class cruiser
- USS Atlanta
- Galveston-class cruiser
- Gearing-class destroyer

==== Canada ====
- HMCS Bonaventure

== See also ==
- List of radars
- List of military electronics of the United States
- Radar configurations and types
- Height finding radar

== Bibliography ==
- Norman Friedman (2006). The Naval Institute Guide to World Naval Weapon Systems. Naval Institute Press. ISBN 9781557502629
- Self-Defense Force Equipment Yearbook 2006-2007. Asaun News Agency. ISBN 4-7509-1027-9
