= AN/SPG-49 =

American missile fire control radar

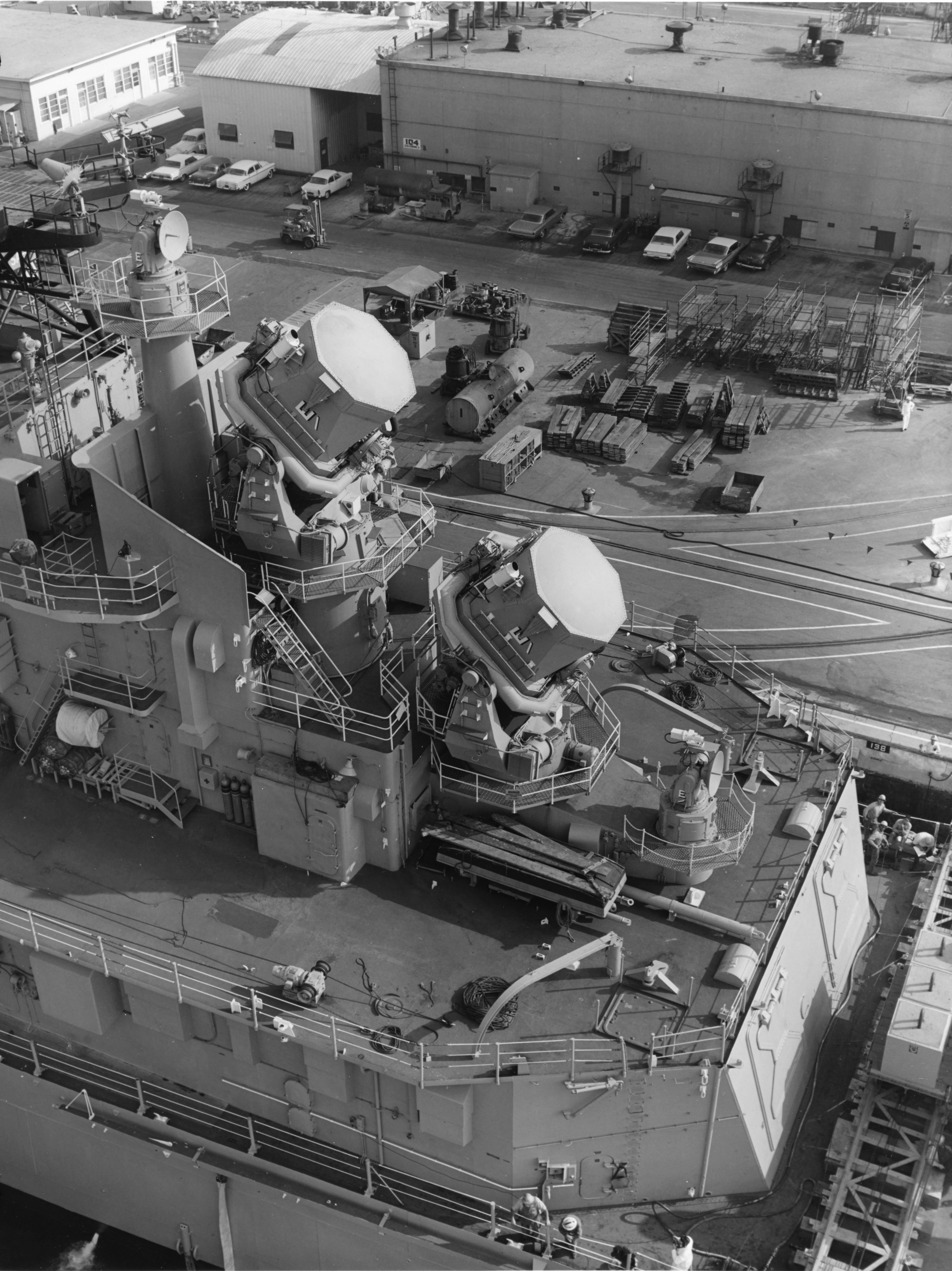
- Plan view of AN/SPG-49 onboard USS Oklahoma City
- Country of origin: United States of America
- Manufacturer: Sperry Gyroscope Company
- Designer: Sperry Gyroscope Company
- Type: Fire-control radar
- Frequency: C band (IEEE) 5400-5900 MHz
- PRF: 450 (tracking) or 500 (acquisition)
- Beamwidth: 1.6°
- Pulsewidth: 3𝜇s
- Range: 294,000 yd (145 nmi)
- Diameter: 110 in (2.8 m)
- Power: 3 MW
- Related: AN/SPQ-5

The AN/SPG-49 is a C-band, monopulse fire control radar for the RIM-8 Talos missile. It was used for target tracking and illumination as part of the Mk 77 missile fire control system. It was the first monopulse radar to be developed for fleet operational use in the U.S. Navy.

== Design and operation ==
The AN/SPG-49 is a component of the Mark-77 Guided Missile Fire Control System. It receives target assignments from the Mk 111 Fire Control System Computer, and provides tracking information for air targets. Based on target tracking information from the AN/SPG-49 and missile range information from the AN/SPW-2, the Mk 111 Fire Control System Computer would calculate guidance beam control commands to direct the missile to the intercept point and direct the AN/SPG-49 to initiate continuous wave illumination once the missile is in its terminal phase. (Note: Nuclear-armed missiles do not have a semi-active phase and are detonated by computer command via datalink. Anti-radiation shots against surface targets that cannot be acquired by SPG-49 are handled by the PDP-8 Surface Trajectory Computer)

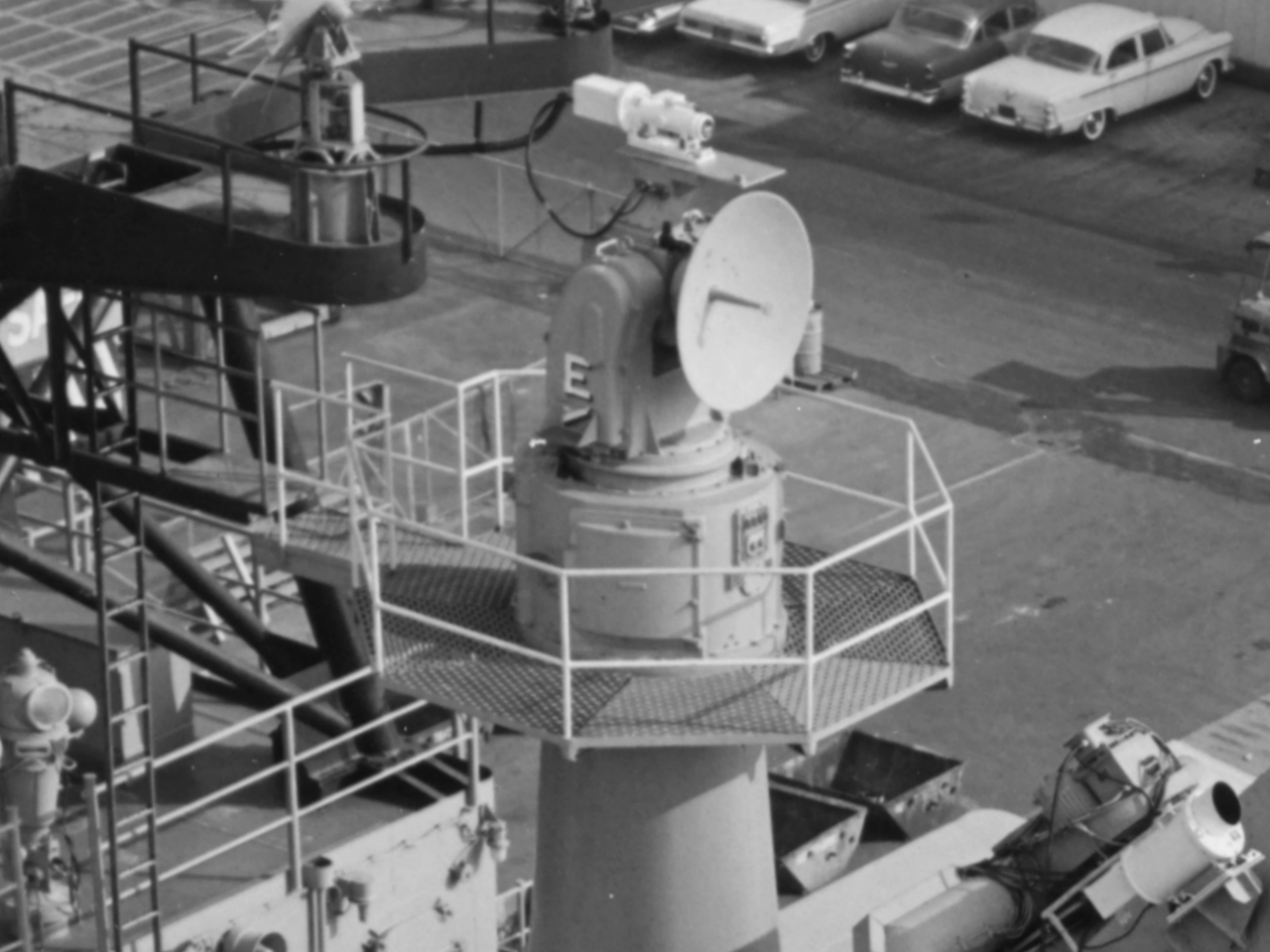
AN/SPW-2 guidance radar aboard USS Oklahoma City in October 1963

During a Talos engagement, the AN/SPG-49 would acquire the target, maintain track of it, and provide continuous wave illumination in the semi-active terminal phase of the engagement. Midcourse beam riding and in-flight datalink with the missile is handled by the AN/SPW-2, a separate antenna. This allows the guidance beam (and, therefore the beam-riding Talos missile) to be pointed independently of the target tracking radar for long-range engagements.

The antenna assembly consists of two integrated radar systems--a three megawatt pulsed acquisition and tracking transmitter, and a five kilowatt continuous wave illumination transmitter--using a common microwave lens, the AT-828/SP. The monopulse "tracking" horn is mounted coaxial with the microwave lens. The output to the AS-782/SPG-49 traverse scan mechanism, a Foster scanner, is vertical and redirected onto the mcrowave lens by a vertical rod grill (AT-636/SPG-49) used as a reflector. The grill is transparent to signals with an electric field perpendicular to the rods and a reflector for signals with the electric field polarized parallel to it, allowing the tracking horn and Foster scanner outputs to be radiated through the microwave lens simultaneously..

Photograph of AN/SPG-49 illuminator showing the rear "clamshell" open for access to system internals.

The AN/SPG-49 has three mods of operation: Acquisition, Tracking, and Illumination. During target acquisition, the output of the pulsed transmitter is routed through two waveguide switches to the traverse scan mechanism, which provides the wide-angle horizontal scan. The polarized reflector is tilted to provide a vertical scan.

During target tracking, the reflector is locked in place at a 45° angle and the three megawatt pulsed signal is routed through the monopulse horn.

During target illumination, the reflector remains locked at 45° and the foster scanner is locked. The five kilowatt continuous wave signal is output through the foster scanner to produce a CW illumination signal coaxial with the tracking beam for terminal guidance.

== History ==
=== Initial development and introduction ===
Development of the AN/SPG-49 was initiated by the Bureau of Ordnance in 1946 under contract with the Sperry Gyroscope Company as an experimental radar for controlling guns and missiles against supersonic targets.

The AN/SPG-49 was introduced to U.S. Navy service along with Talos in 1958 with the USS Galveston.

=== Replacement ===
Three attempts--the first starting before the first Talos ship was commissioned (Note: The USS Galveston, commissioned 28 May 1958.)--were made to replace the AN/SPG-49: the AN/SPG-56, AN/SPG-61, and the AN/SPG-51E. All three were canceled before adoption. The SPG-56, proposed November 1956, was planned for future heavy cruiser conversions (CG-13 through 15), but the development of the (later canceled) RIM-50 Typhon and associated AN/SPG-59 radar prompted the cancellation of these follow-on ships. One prototype was ordered January 1957 and was employed by White Sands Missile Range.

The RCA SPG-61 was proposed as part of an AAW modernization for the Talos cruisers in 1966, with a projected in-service date of 1971 and complete replacement of SPG-49 by 1974. The SPG-61 program was canceled with one prototype completed.

The SPG-51E was intended as a combined Talos/Terrier design.

=== Retirement ===
The unreliability of the AN/SPG-49 contributed to the decision to retire Talos, and the system was withdrawn from service in 1979. Attempts to resolve this issue through a replacement for the AN/SPG-49 failed because there were too few Talos ships on which to mount it. Ultimately, the AN/SPG-49 was retired in 1981 with the end of RIM-8 Talos in the U.S. Navy.

== Platforms ==
=== United States Navy ===
- Albany-class cruiser
- Galveston-class cruiser
- USS Long Beach
