= Galveston-class cruiser =

Class of American warships (1958–1979)

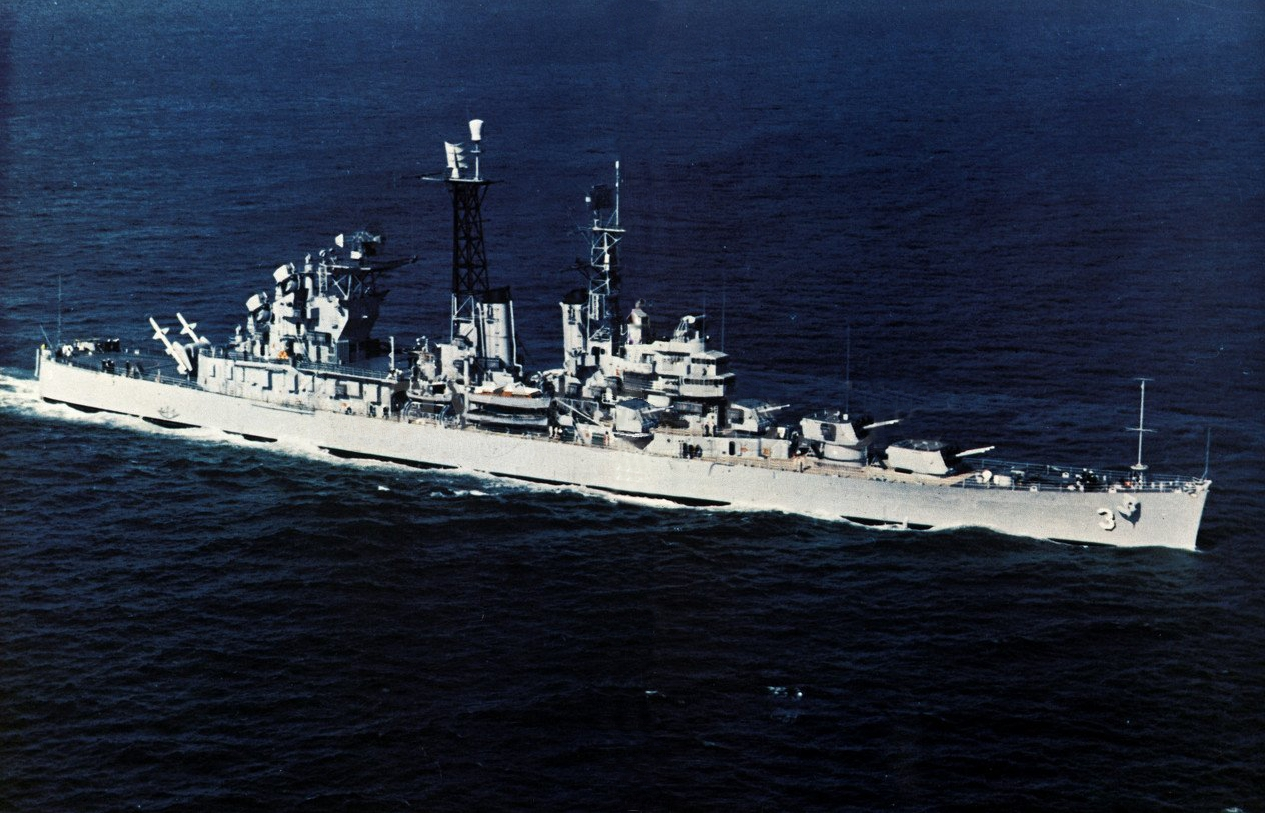
- USS Galveston underway, circa in 1960

Class overview
- Operators: United States Navy
- Preceded by: Boston class
- Succeeded by: Providence class
- Subclasses: Cleveland class
- In commission: 1958—1979
- Completed: 3
- Retired: 3
- Scrapped: 1, 1 sunk as target
- Preserved: 1 (USS Little Rock)

General characteristics
- Type: Guided missile cruiser
- Displacement: 15,205 tons
- Length: 610 ft (185.9 m)
- Beam: 66 ft (20.1 m)
- Draft: 25 ft (7.6 m)
- Propulsion: 4 × 634 psi boilers, steam turbines, 4 shafts
- Speed: 32.5 knots (60.2 km/h; 37.4 mph)
- Complement: 1,395 officers and enlisted
- Sensors & processing systems: Little Rock and Oklahoma City: AN/SPS-2 height-finding radar; AN/SPS-10 surface-search radar; AN/SPS-17 air-search radar; AN/SPG-49 fire-control radar; AN/SPS-42 reflector antenna; AN/SRN-6 TACAN; Galveston: AN/SPS-10 surface-search radar; AN/SPS-30 height-finding radar; AN/SPS-43 air-search radar; AN/SPS-52 air-search radar; AN/SPG-49 fire-control radar; AN/SRN-6 TACAN
- Armament: Little Rock and Oklahoma City: 1 × triple 6-inch/47-caliber guns; 1 × dual 5"/38 caliber guns; 1 × dual Mark 7 RIM-8 Talos missile launcher; Galveston: 2 × triple 6"/47 cal guns; 3 × dual 5"/38 caliber guns; 1 × dual Mark 7 RIM-8 Talos missile launcher
- Aircraft carried: 1 × UH-2B or SH-3G
- Aviation facilities: Helipad

Originally built as Cleveland-class light cruisers (CL) in the United States Navy during World War II, in 1957 three ships were re-designated as Galveston-class guided missile light cruisers (CLG) and fitted with the Talos long-range surface-to-air missile system. During the two-year refit under project SCB 140, the aft superstructure was completely replaced and all aft guns were removed to make room for the twin-arm Talos launcher and a 46-missile storage magazine. Three large masts were also installed in order to hold a variety of radars, missile guidance, and communications systems. Little Rock and Oklahoma City were simultaneously converted into fleet flagships under SCB 140A, which involved removing two forward dual 5-inch (127 mm) and one triple 6-inch (152 mm) turrets, and replacing them with a massively rebuilt and expanded forward superstructure. Galveston, in the non-flagship configuration, retained the Cleveland-class's standard forward weapons: three dual 5-inch (127 mm) and two triple 6-inch (152 mm) turrets.

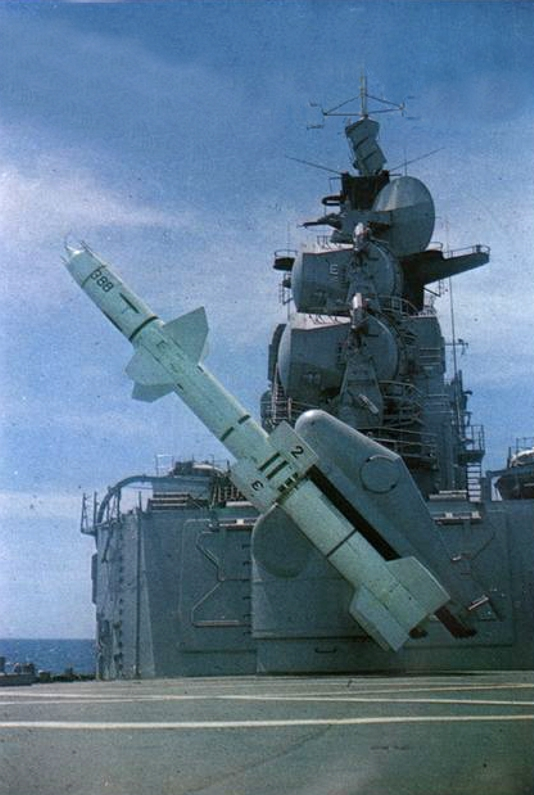
RIM-8 Talos missile aboard USS Oklahoma City (CLG-5), circa in 1966

A similar pattern was followed in converting three other Cleveland-class ships (Providence, Springfield, and Topeka) to operate the Terrier surface-to-air missile system, creating the Providence class. Providence and Springfield were outfitted as fleet flagships, but Topeka was not.

Like the Providence class cruisers, the Galveston class ships suffered from serious stability problems caused by the topweight of the missile system. Indeed, the Galveston class ships were more affected by heavy Talos missile system than the Terrier equipped ships. Weight reduction measures and the use of ballast were necessary to improve stability. The cruisers, particularly Galveston, also suffered from hogging of the hull.

All three Galveston-class ships were decommissioned to the reserve fleet between 1970 and 1979. In the 1975 cruiser realignment, Little Rock and Oklahoma City were reclassified as guided missile cruisers (CG).

The ships were stricken from the Naval Vessel Register between 1973 and 1979. Galveston was scrapped in the mid-1970s, Oklahoma City was sunk as a target in 1999, and Little Rock is a museum ship in Buffalo, NY.

== Ships in class ==
Ship Name	Hull No.	Converted at	Laid down	Launched	Commissioned	Decommissioned	Fate
Galveston	CLG-3	Philadelphia Naval Shipyard	20 February 1944	22 April 1945	28 May 1958	25 May 1970	Sold for scrap, 16 May 1975
Little Rock	CLG-4	New York Shipbuilding Corporation	6 March 1943	27 August 1944	3 June 1960	22 November 1976	Museum ship, Buffalo and Erie County Naval & Military Park, Buffalo, New York
Oklahoma City	CLG-5	Bethlehem Steel, San Francisco	8 December 1942	20 February 1944	7 September 1960	15 December 1979	Sunk as target by Republic of Korea Submarine Lee Chun (SS 062), 25 March 1999

== See also ==
- List of cruisers of the United States Navy
