= Forrestal-class aircraft carrier =

Decommissioned class of U.S. supercarriers

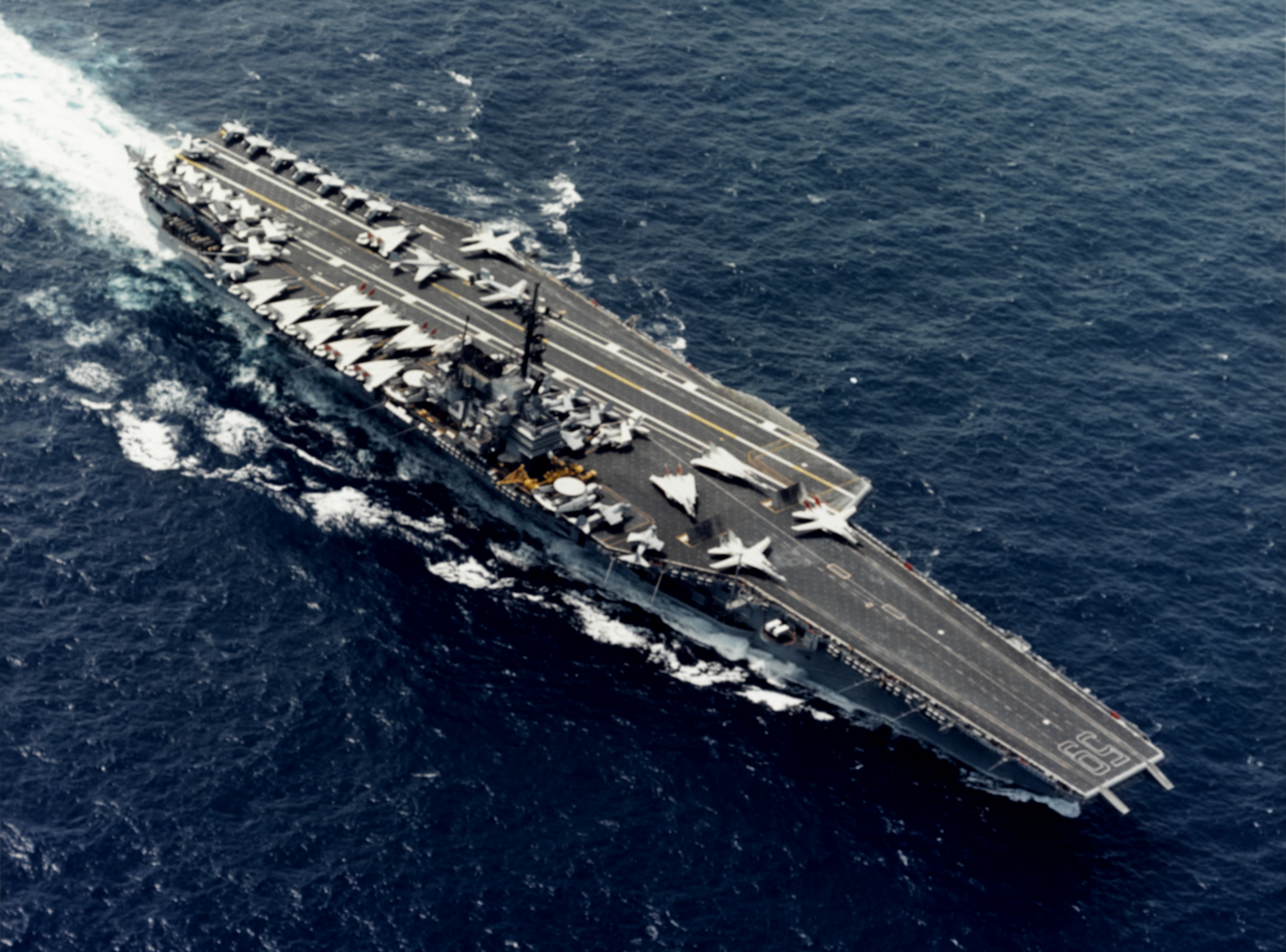
- USS Forrestal in 1987

Class overview
- Name: Forrestal class
- Builders: New York Navy Yard; Newport News Shipbuilding
- Operators: United States Navy
- Preceded by: United States (proposed) and Midway class (actual)
- Succeeded by: Kitty Hawk class and Enterprise class
- Built: 14 July 1952 – 6 June 1958
- In commission: 1 October 1955 – 30 September 1998
- Completed: 4
- Scrapped: 4

General characteristics
- Type: Aircraft carrier
- Displacement: 60,000 long tons (61,000 t) light; 81,000 long tons (82,000 t) full load
- Length: 1,069 ft 11 in (326.1 m) overall; 989 ft 10 in (301.7 m) waterline
- Beam: 238 ft (73 m) extreme width; 129 ft 4 in (39.42 m) waterline
- Draft: 35 ft 9 in (10.90 m)
- Propulsion: 8 Steam turbines; 280,000 shp (210,000 kW)
- Speed: 34 knots (63 km/h)
- Complement: 4,378
- Armament: Original armament: 8 × 5 in (127 mm)/54 caliber Mark 42 guns; Refit armament: 3 × 8 cell NATO Sea Sparrow Mark 29 missile launchers; 3 × 20 mm Phalanx CIWS Mark 15 guns
- Armor: Belt: 6 in (152 mm); Flight deck: 3 in (76 mm); Torpedo Bulkheads: 3 in (76 mm)
- Aircraft carried: 1955-1960: 24-28 Vought F-8 Crusaders or McDonnell F3H Demons or North American FJ-2/3 Skyfurys or Douglas F4D Skyrays; 36 Douglas A-4 Skyhawks or Douglas AD-6 Skyraiders and AD-5N Skyraiders; 10-12 AD-5W Skyraiders; 10-12 Douglas A-3 Skywarriors; Total: ~84 aircraft; 1960: 24-28 Vought F-8 Crusaders or McDonnell F3H Demons; 36 Douglas A-4 Skyhawks; 10-12 Douglas A-3 Skywarriors; 1 squadron of Douglas AD-5W Skyraiders; Total: ~84 aircraft; 1970: 24 McDonnell Douglas F-4 Phantom IIs; 24 LTV A-7 Corsair IIs or Douglas A-4 Skyhawks; 1 squadron of Grumman A-6A/B Intruders; 4 North American RA-5C Vigilantes; 4-6 Northrop Grumman E-2A Hawkeyes; 1 squadron of Douglas EKA-3B Skywarriors; 1 squadron of Sikorsky SH-3A Sea Kings or Kaman UH-2C Seasprites; 1 squadron of Vought RF-8G Crusaders; 1 squadron of Douglas KA-3B Skywarriors; Total: ~90 aircraft; 1981: 24 McDonnell Douglas F-4 Phantom IIs or Grumman F-14 Tomcats; 24 LTV A-7 Corsair IIs; 10-12 Grumman A-6E Intruders; 4 Grumman KA-6D Intruders; 4-6 Northrop Grumman E-2C Hawkeyes; 4-6 Northrop Grumman EA-6B Prowlers; 10 Lockheed S-3A Vikings; 6 Sikorsky SH-3G/H Sea Kings; 1 squadron of Douglas EA-3 Skywarriors; 3 Vought RF-8G Crusaders; Total: 86-92 aircraft
- Aviation facilities: 326 m × 77 m (1,069 ft 7 in × 252 ft 7 in) flight deck; 4 steam catapults; 4 deck edge aircraft elevators; 3 hangar decks

The Forrestal-class aircraft carriers were four aircraft carriers designed and built for the United States Navy in the 1950s. The class ship was named for James Forrestal, the first United States Secretary of Defense. It was the first class of supercarriers, combining high tonnage, deck-edge elevators and an angled deck. The first ship was commissioned in 1955, the last decommissioned in 1998. The four ships of the class were scrapped in Brownsville, Texas, between 2014 and 2017.

== Design ==
The Forrestal class was the first completed class of "supercarriers" of the U.S. Navy, so called because of their then-extraordinarily high tonnage of around 75,000 tons, which was 25% larger than the post-World War II-era Midway class. Additionally full integration of an angled deck, a large island, and a large air wing consisting of 80–100 jet aircraft, compared to 65–75 for the Midway class and fewer than 50 for the Essex class.

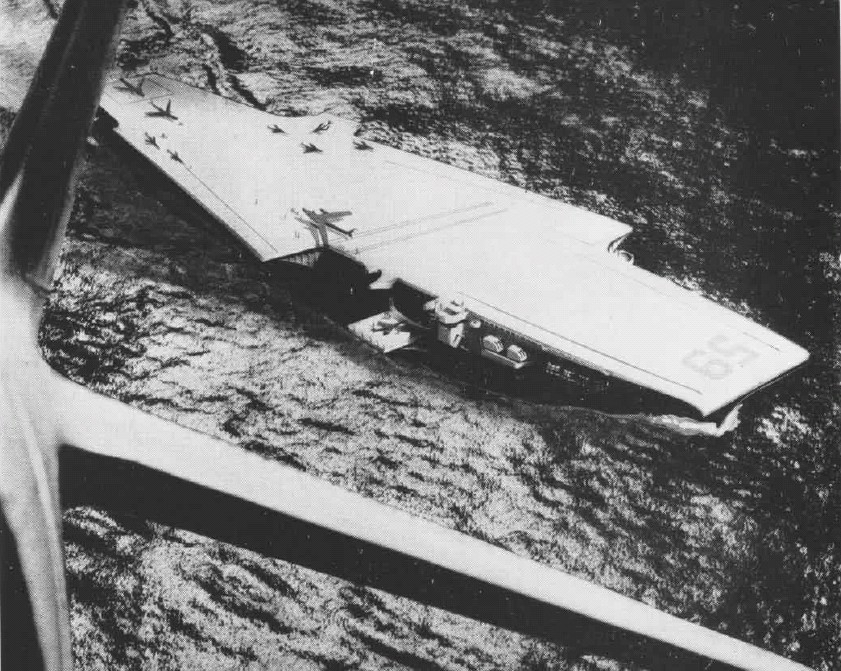
A 1952 design study.

Compared to the Midway class, the Forrestals were 100 feet (30 m) longer and nearly 20 feet (6 m) wider abeam, resulting in a far more stable and comfortable aircraft platform even in very rough weather. When commissioned, the Forrestal-class ships had the roomiest hangar decks and largest flight decks of any carrier ever built. Because of their immense size they were built to a new, deep-hulled design that incorporated the armored flight deck into the hull (previous American design practice was to design the flight deck as superstructure). This was a very similar structural design as used on British "armored" carriers, and grew out of the requirement for such a very large carrier, because carrying the strength deck at the flight deck level produced a stronger and lighter hull. The Midway-class ships sat very low in the water and were poor sea boats through their long careers; they were very wet forward and their aviation characteristics were poor. The deeper Forrestal hull allowed the ships more freeboard and better seakeeping. The Forrestal-class carriers, like the Midway class that preceded it, were designed with armored flight decks.

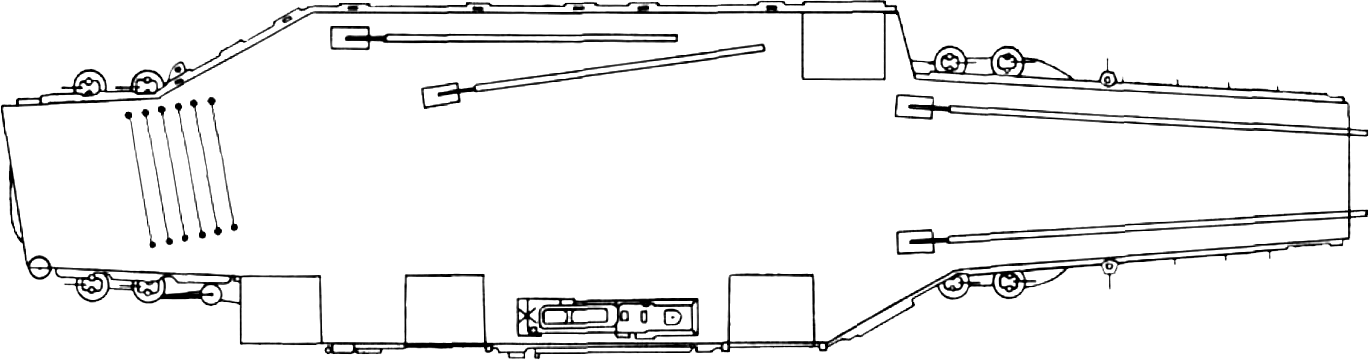
1962 deck plan of the Forrestal class, showing the port side elevator at the forward end of the angled deck, in the path of both aircraft being launched from the waist catapults, and aircraft being recovered; and the arrangement of the starboard elevators, with only one forward of the island serving the two forward catapults.

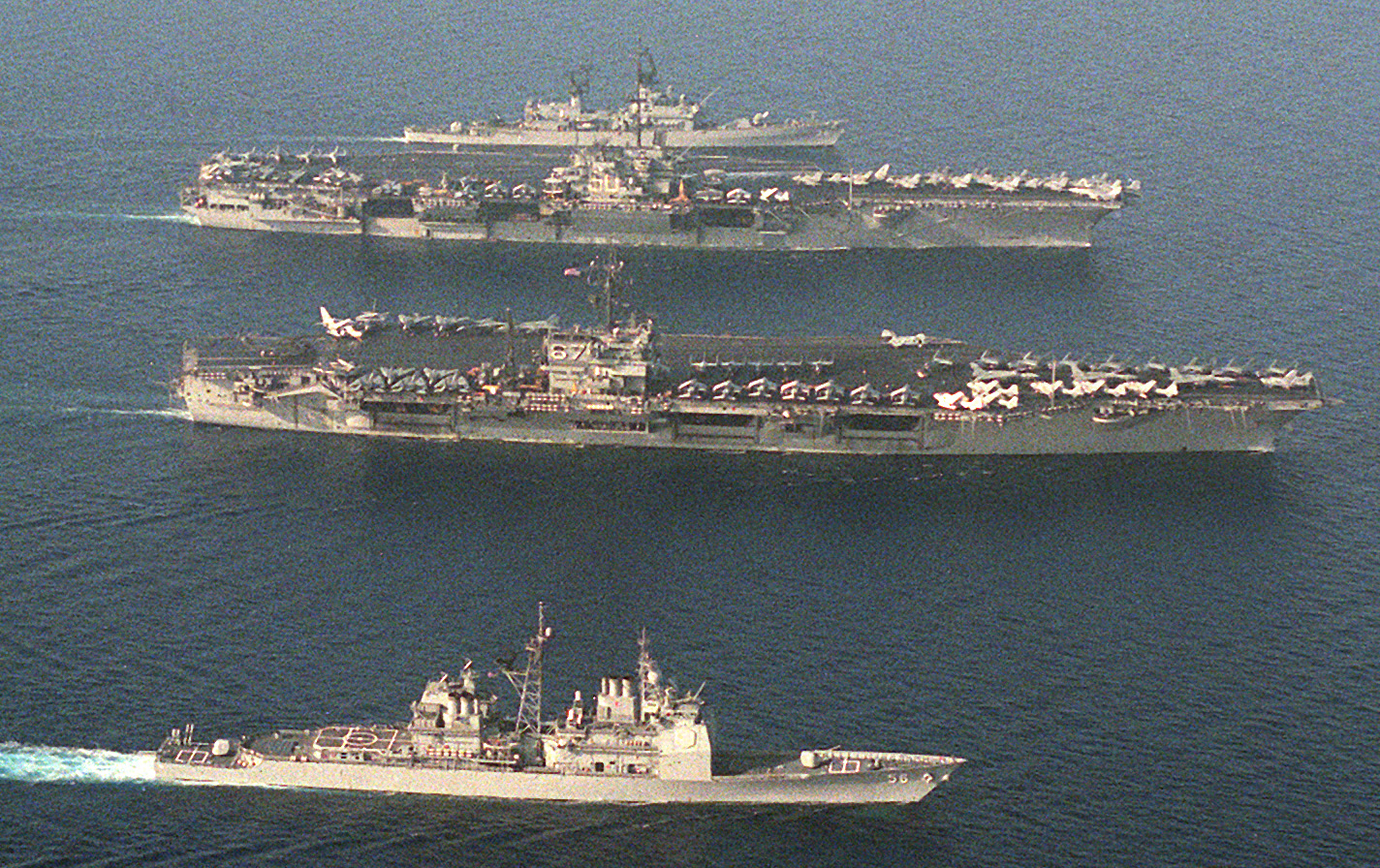
Saratoga (top) cruising with USS John F. Kennedy (CV-67); note the arrangement of the islands and elevators.

Forrestal-class ships were the first examples of supercarriers and thus not quite a perfected design; their elevators in particular were badly arranged for aircraft handling. The portside elevator, a relic of the original axial-deck design, was especially poorly sited, as it was located at the fore end of the angled deck, in the landing path as well as the launch path of aircraft from the No. 3 and No. 4 catapults. The subsequent Kitty Hawk class moved the portside elevator to the aft end of the angle and reversed the position of the island and the second starboard elevator, vastly improving aircraft handling. The sponson-mounted guns suffered from poor range and complicated firing arcs, and were located in very wet and thus nearly useless positions in the bow and stern. They were removed after only a few years and were later replaced by missiles and much later by close-in weapon systems (CIWS). The aft guns in Forrestal lasted until the fire in 1967, then were removed and eventually replaced by missiles in the mid-70s.

The original design of the Forrestal-class ships would have had a very small, retractable island; this design had numerous problems (the mechanism to raise and lower the island was never perfected before the angled deck was added to the design) and smoke fouling of the deck was expected to be a severe problem due to lack of adequate venting. The redesign to an angled deck allowed a very large island, much larger than on previous carriers, giving unprecedented flexibility and control in air operations.

Forrestal and Saratoga were designed under project SCB 80 and laid down as axial deck carriers and converted to angled deck ships while under construction; Ranger and Independence were laid down as angled deck ships and had various minor improvements compared to the first two. The most visible differences were between the first pair and second pair: Forrestal and Saratoga were completed with two island masts, an open fantail, and a larger flight deck segment forward of the port aircraft elevator; Ranger and Independence had a single island mast, a more closed fantail (as seen in all carriers since), and a smaller flight deck segment forward of the port aircraft elevator.

== History ==
In the late 1990s, the US offered Brazil a Forrestal-class carrier, but the offer was declined on the grounds of significant operating costs; Brazil instead purchased the French aircraft carrier Foch, which was renamed São Paulo. All four ships have been struck from the Naval Vessel Register and have all since been scrapped.

== Ships in class ==
Name	Hull number	Photo	Builder	Ordered	Laid down	Launched	Commissioned	Decommissioned	Fate	Source
Forrestal	CV-59		Newport News Shipbuilding and Drydock Co., Newport News	12 July 1951	14 July 1952	11 December 1954	1 October 1955	11 September 1993	Broken up at Brownsville, 2014	
Saratoga	CV-60		New York Naval Shipyard, New York City	23 July 1952	16 December 1952	8 October 1955	14 April 1956	20 August 1994	Broken up at Brownsville, 2014	
Ranger	CV-61		Newport News Shipbuilding and Drydock Co., Newport News	1 February 1954	2 August 1954	29 September 1956	10 August 1957	10 July 1993	Broken up at Brownsville, 2015	
Independence	CV-62		New York Naval Shipyard, New York City	2 July 1954	1 July 1955	6 June 1958	10 January 1959	30 September 1998	Broken up at Brownsville, 2017	
