= Gordon-class vehicle cargo ship =

Class of ship

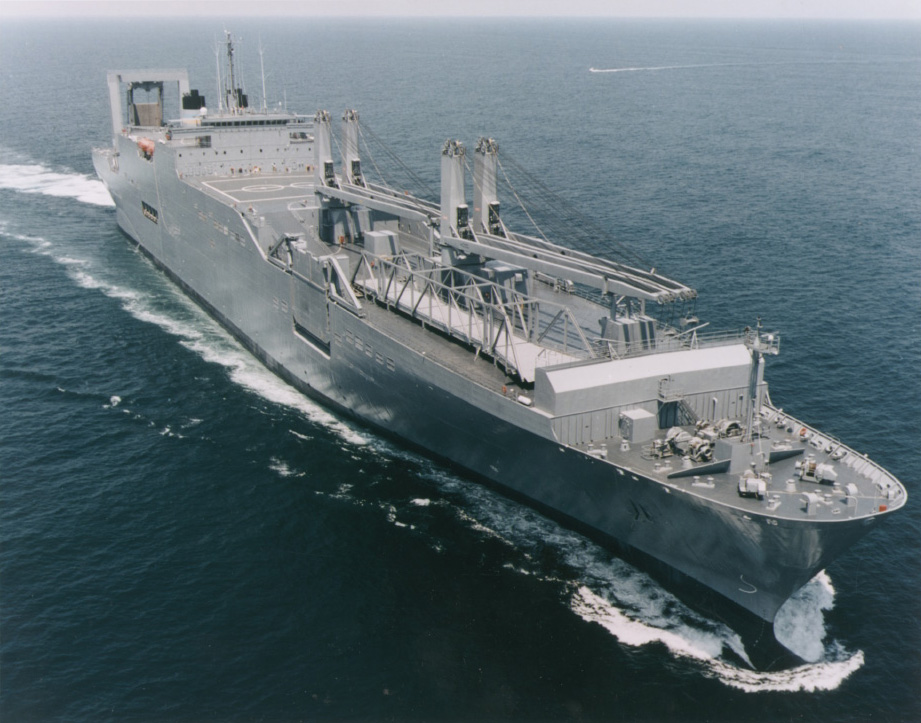

Class overview
- Builders: Burmeister & Wain Shipyard Denmark
- Operators: Military Sealift Command
- In commission: 1997–2023
- Completed: 2
- Laid up: 2

General characteristics
- Type: Roll on roll off vehicle cargo ship
- Displacement: 32,589 t.(lt) 65,000 t.(fl)
- Length: 954 ft (291 m)
- Beam: 105 ft 9 in (32.23 m)
- Draft: 36 ft (11 m)
- Propulsion: 1 × Burmeister & Wain 12K84EF diesel; 26,000 hp(m) (19.11 MW); 2 × Burmeister & Wain 9K84EF diesels, 39,000 hp(m) (28.66 MW); 3 shafts (center cp prop) bow thruster
- Speed: 24 knots (44 km/h)
- Capacity: 284,064 sq ft (26,390.4 m^{2}); 49,991 sq ft (4,644.3 m^{2}) deck cargo
- Complement: 12 reduced / up to 45 full, civilian mariners 50 US Navy personnel
- Armament: None
- Aviation facilities: Helicopter landing pad

The Gordon-class vehicle cargo ship is a class of Large, Medium-Speed Roll-on/Roll-off cargo ship used for prepositioning of military vehicles and other materiel by the United States Navy. Both ships were originally merchant vessels and were acquired and converted by the Navy. Both ships of the class were in the Military Sealift Command but are now stricken from the Naval Vessel Register and are in the Ready Reserve Force.

== Ships in class ==
| Ship | Hull. No. | Namesake | Launched | Years active | Status | Refs |
|---|---|---|---|---|---|---|
| Gary I. Gordon | T-AKR-296 | Gary Gordon | 12 September 1972 | 23 August 1998 - 26 April 2023 | Stricken, in Ready Reserve Force | |
| Charles L. Gilliland | T-AKR-298 | Charles L. Gilliland | 21 April 1972 | 23 May 1997 - 17 May 2023 | Stricken, in Ready Reserve Force | |
