= Lincoln, Maine (disambiguation) =

There are a few places in Maine named Lincoln:

- Lincoln, Maine, a town of 5,200
  - Lincoln (CDP), Maine, a census-designated place in the town
- Lincoln Plantation, Maine, in Oxford County
- Lincoln County, Maine
