= USS Long Beach (CGN-9) =

Long Beach-class missile cruiser

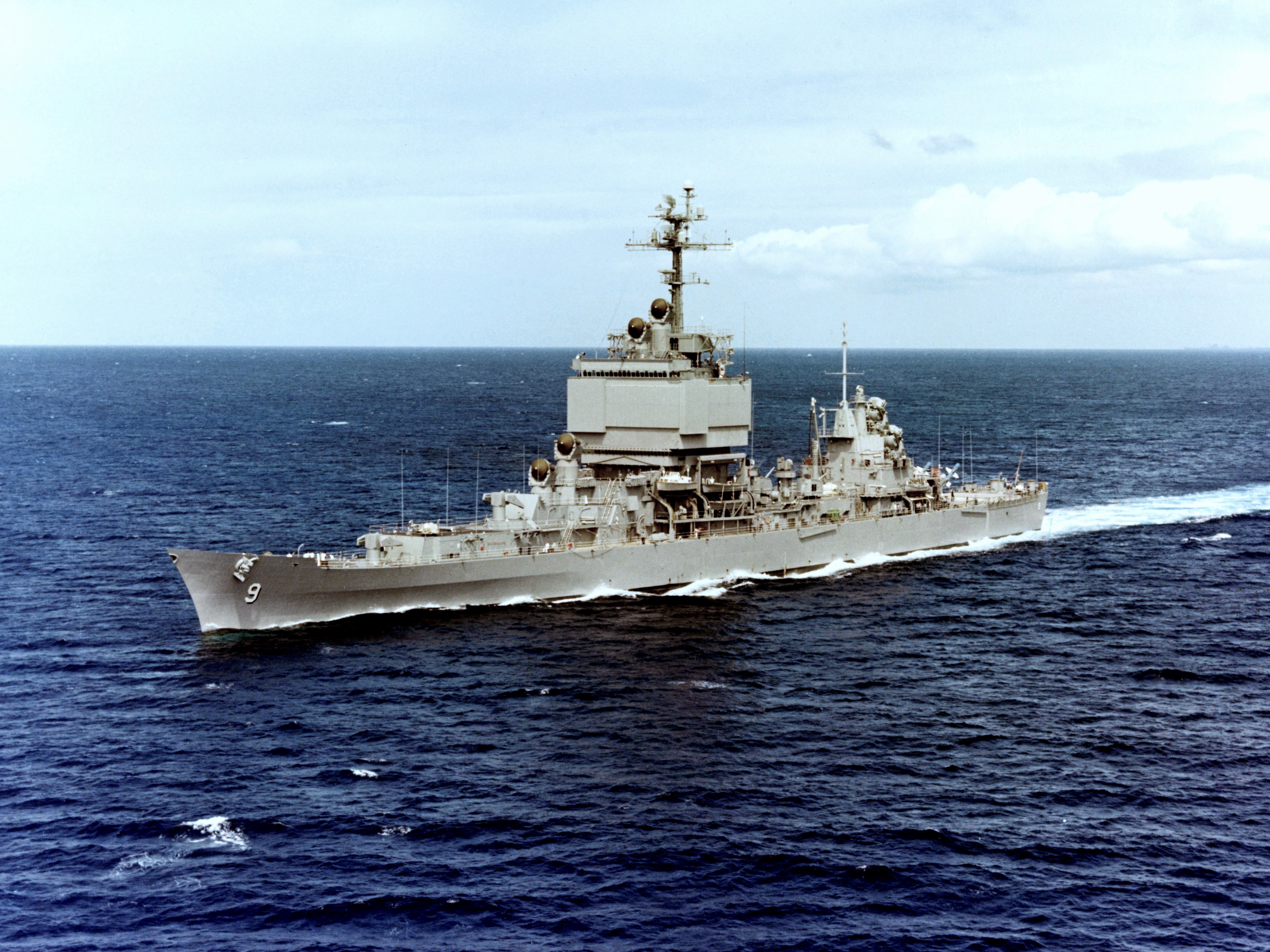
- USS Long Beach on 9 May 1973

Class overview
- Builders: Bethlehem Steel Co., Fore River Shipyard, Quincy, Massachusetts
- Preceded by: Providence class
- Succeeded by: Albany class
- Built: 1957–1961
- In commission: 1961–1995
- Completed: 1
- Retired: 1

History

United States
- Name: Long Beach
- Namesake: Long Beach
- Ordered: 15 October 1956
- Laid down: 2 December 1957
- Launched: 14 July 1959
- Sponsored by: Mrs. Marian Swanson-Hosmer
- Acquired: 1 September 1961
- Commissioned: 9 September 1961
- Decommissioned: 1 May 1995; (deactivated on 2 July 1994)
- Reclassified: As CGN-9 1 July 1958
- Stricken: 1 May 1995
- Motto: Strike Hard, Strike Home
- Fate: A 423 ft (129 m) section of the hull (propulsion block) remain at PSNS as of May 2018.

General characteristics
- Type: Nuclear-powered guided missile cruiser
- Displacement: 15,540 tons
- Length: 721 ft 3 in (219.84 m)
- Beam: 71 ft 6 in (21.79 m)
- Draft: 30 ft 7 in (9.32 m)
- Propulsion: 2 C1W nuclear reactors; 2 General Electric turbines; 80,000 shp (60 MW); 2 propellers
- Speed: 30 knots (56 km/h)
- Range: Unlimited (nuclear)
- Complement: 1,160 officers and men
- Sensors & processing systems: 1 AN/SPS-10 surface search radar; AN/SPS-12 search radar; AN/SPS-32 bearing and range radar; AN/SPS-33 target tracking radar; AN/SPS-48 3D air search radar; AN/SPS-49 2D air search radar; 2 × AN/SPG-49 Talos fire control radar; 4 × AN/SPG-55 Terrier fire control radar; AN/SQS-23 SONAR
- Electronic warfare & decoys: AN/SLQ-32 SRBOC
- Armament: 2 × twin Mk10 launchers with Terrier SAMs (later replaced with Standard ER SAMs); 1 × twin Mk-12 launcher with Talos SAMs (later removed); 1 × 8-cell ASROC launcher; 2 × 5 in (127 mm) guns; 2 × Mk-15 Vulcan-Phalanx 20mm CIWS; 2 × triple 12.75 inch ASW torpedo tubes for Mk 44 or Mk 46 ASW torpedoes; Launchers for 8 Harpoon missiles added later; 2 Armored Box Launchers for a total of eight Tomahawk cruise missiles replaced the Talos launcher
- Aviation facilities: Landing pad available for one helicopter

USS Long Beach (CLGN-160/CGN-160/CGN-9) was a nuclear-powered guided missile cruiser in the United States Navy and the world's first nuclear-powered surface combatant. She was the third Navy ship named after the city of Long Beach, California.

She was the sole member of the Long Beach class, and the last cruiser built for the United States Navy to a cruiser design; all subsequent cruiser classes were built on scaled-up destroyer hulls (and originally classified as destroyer leaders) or, in the case of the Albany class, converted from already existing cruisers.

Long Beach was laid down 2 December 1957, launched 14 July 1959 and commissioned 9 September 1961 under the command of then-Captain Eugene Parks Wilkinson, who previously served as the first commanding officer of the world's first nuclear-powered vessel, the submarine USS Nautilus. She was deployed to Vietnam during the Vietnam War and served numerous times in the Western Pacific, Indian Ocean and Persian Gulf. But by the 1990s, nuclear power was deemed too expensive to use on surface ships smaller than an aircraft carrier in view of defense budget cutbacks after the end of the Cold War. Long Beach was decommissioned on 1 May 1995 instead of receiving her third nuclear refueling and proposed upgrade. After removal of the nuclear fuel, superstructure, and sections of the bow and stern, the hull segment containing the reactor and machinery spaces was moored at Puget Sound Naval Shipyard and sold for scrap.

== Configuration ==
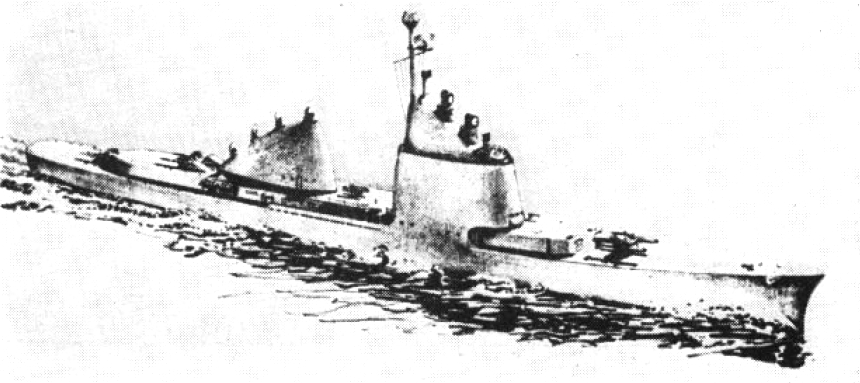
Artist's concept of nuclear powered cruiser design from 1956

Long Beach was originally intended to be a smaller frigate, but was then redesigned and expanded to a cruiser hull, allowing for an open space just aft of the bridge "box". This open space was first planned to accommodate the mounting of a Regulus nuclear-armed cruise missile, but was then changed to four launch tubes for the Polaris missile. However, the space was eventually occupied by the 5-inch/38-caliber gun mounts and the ASROC system. Long Beach was the last cruiser built with a World War II-era cruiser hull style, as later new-build cruisers were built with different hull forms, such as the converted frigates Leahy, Bainbridge, Belknap, Truxtun, and the California and Virginia classes, or the Ticonderoga-class cruiser that was built on a Spruance-class destroyer hull.

The high box-like superstructure contained the SCANFAR system, consisting of the AN/SPS-32 and AN/SPS-33 phased array radars. One of the reasons Long Beach was a single-ship class was because she was an experimental platform for these radars, which were precursors to the AN/SPY-1 phased array systems later installed on Aegis equipped Ticonderoga-class cruisers and Arleigh Burke-class destroyers. The taller, narrower AN/SPS-33 panels were not installed on the superstructure until some time after her commissioning. At the time, Long Beach had the highest bridge of any ship smaller than an aircraft carrier.

In addition to steel, Long Beach was built with 450 tons of structural aluminum. Because of this unusually high quantity of aluminum, she was assigned the voice radio call sign "Alcoa". The ship was propelled by two nuclear reactors, one for each propeller shaft, and was capable of speeds in excess of 30 knots (56 km/h). Although the ship was originally designed with an "all-missile" armament, it is claimed that the decision to add two 5-inch/38-caliber gun mounts amidships was ordered by President John F. Kennedy.

== Weapons suite ==
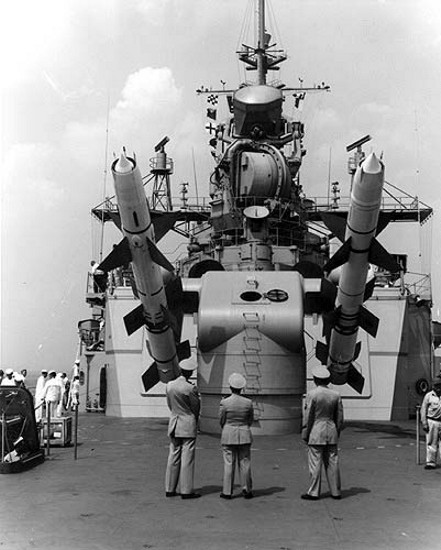
RIM-8 Talos missile launcher on USS Long Beach, July 1961

The original weapons suite consisted of:

- One rear Mk 12 launcher for the Talos long range surface-to-air missiles (SAM) with a range in excess of 80 nmi (150 km).
- Two forward Mk 10 launchers for the Terrier medium range SAMs with a range in excess of 30 miles (48 km).
- RUR-5 ASROC anti-submarine system capable of delivering a torpedo or depth charge at a range of 10,000 yd (9.1 km), located amidships.
- Two triple 12.75-inch torpedo launchers that could fire the Mark 46 torpedo.
- Two 5-inch/38-caliber guns, capable of surface and shore bombardment to a range of 18,000 yd (16 km), located side by side amidships behind the ASROC launcher.

The ship went through several modifications by the time she was decommissioned. The final weapons suite consisted of:

- Two Mk-10 launchers for the Standard extended range missiles. These replaced the Terrier missiles.
- The rear launcher for the Talos was removed and initially replaced with two quadruple mounts for the RGM-84 Harpoon anti-ship missile.
- Two Phalanx CIWS were added on the aft side of the aft mast.
- Two quadruple armored box launchers were added for the BGM-109 Tomahawk cruise missile. These were installed aft on the fantail, with the Harpoon launchers relocated to positions left and right of the aft mast.

The 5-inch/38 guns and the ASROC were retained, and several 12.7 mm (50-cal) were installed as needed.

== History ==
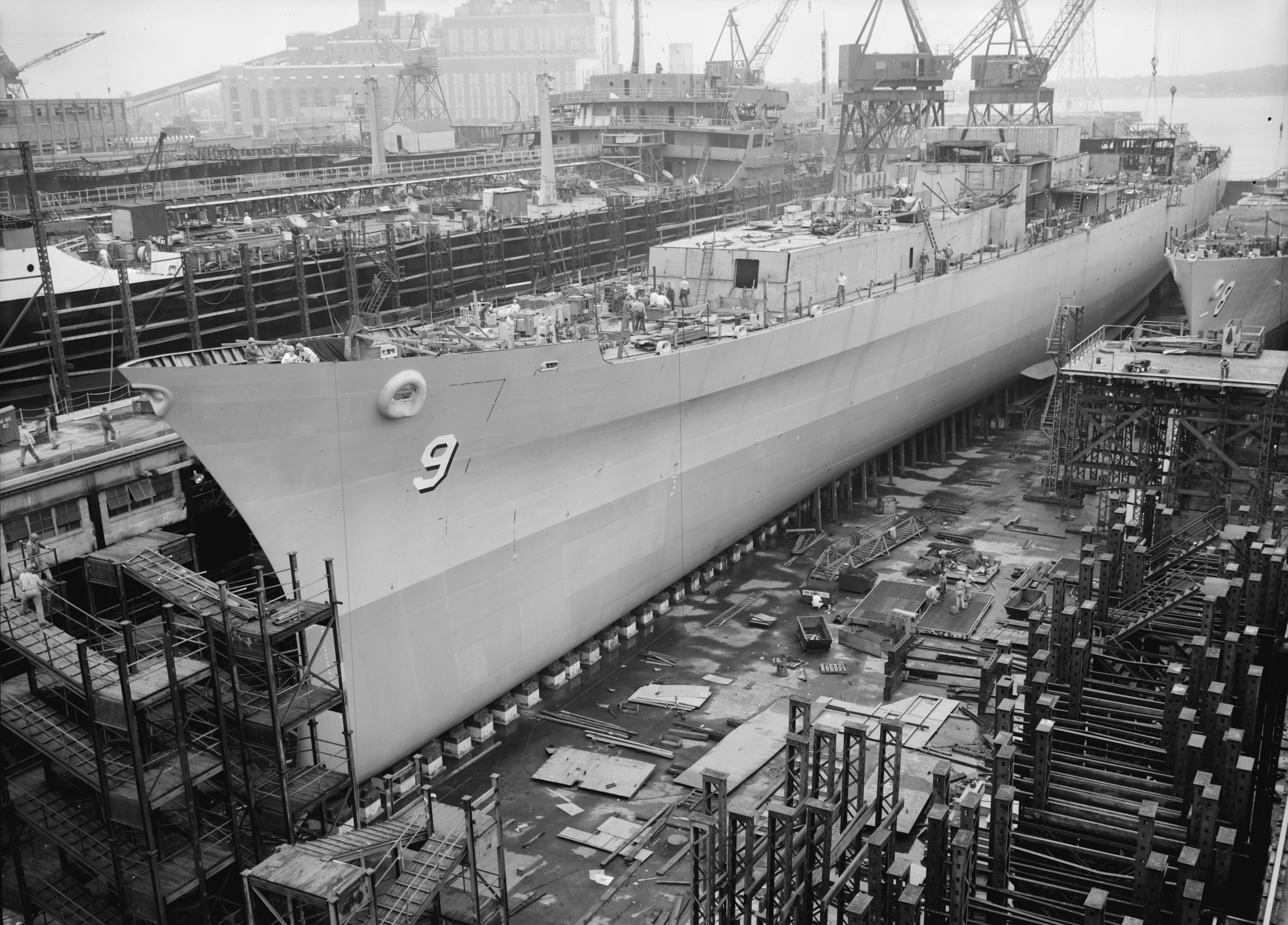
USS Long Beach, and USS Macdonough (far right), under construction at Fore River Shipyard, July 1959.

Long Beach was originally ordered as CLGN-160. She was reclassified CGN-160 in early 1957, but was again reclassified as CGN-9 on 1 July 1957. Her keel was laid down on 2 December 1957 by Bethlehem Steel Co., Fore River Shipyard, Quincy, Massachusetts. She was launched 14 July 1959, sponsored by Mrs. Marian Swanson-Hosmer, the wife of Rear Admiral Craig Hosmer (USNR, Ret.), a Congressman from California, and commissioned on 9 September 1961. At commissioning, the ship was reported to have cost $320 million ($3.45 billion today), which was over budget from earlier estimates of $250 million.

During construction in January 1960, it was widely reported that Long Beach was sabotaged when anti-mine (degaussing) electrical cables were found to have been intentionally cut in three places. It was the second of three incidents at Fore River Shipyard at that time.

Long Beach was assigned to the Atlantic Fleet and home ported at Naval Station Norfolk. The guided‑missile cruiser conducted extensive shakedown testing of her complex weapons and propulsion systems from 2 October to 16 December 1961; her performance proved the nuclear cruiser a capable warship. Between 28 December and 6 January 1962 she conducted operational tests of her missiles off Puerto Rico, then sailed for Bremerhaven, Germany, arriving 15 January for courtesy calls in north European ports.

Returning to Norfolk, Virginia 7 February 1962, Long Beach, trained off the east coast and in the Caribbean. On 10 April, she joined Atlantic Fleet as flagship for Admiral Robert L. Dennison, Commander in Chief, Atlantic Fleet, for exercises off the coasts of U.S. states North Carolina and Virginia. She was reviewed by President John F. Kennedy and Vice President Lyndon B. Johnson during this time.

Long Beach served in the Atlantic Fleet from her commissioning in 1961 until completing her first refueling in early 1966, when the cruiser was transferred from her home port of Norfolk to Naval Station Long Beach, California.

== Operational history ==
=== 1960s ===
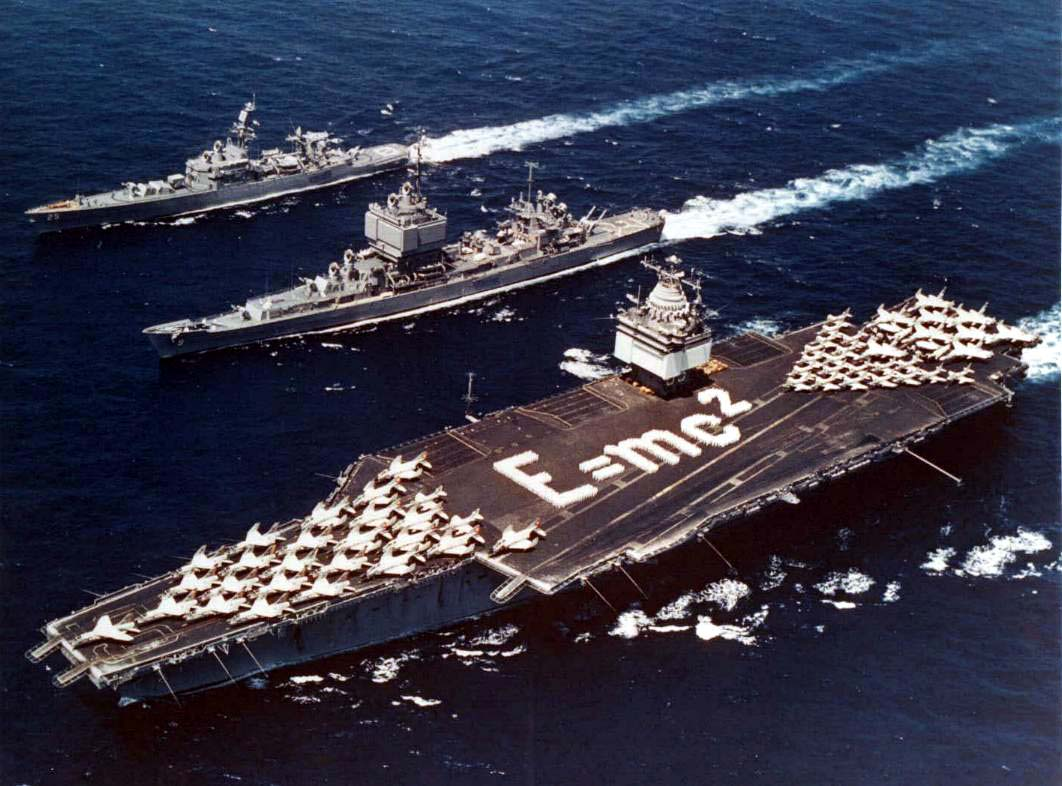
Operation "Sea Orbit" – USS Bainbridge, Long Beach, and Enterprise.

After overhaul and installation of new equipment at the Philadelphia Naval Shipyard, Long Beach again trained in the Caribbean, and then sailed 6 August 1963 to join the Sixth Fleet in the Mediterranean for peacekeeping operations. She returned to Norfolk 20 December for coastal and Caribbean operations through 28 April 1964 when she sailed for the Mediterranean again to join aircraft carrier USS Enterprise and guided missile destroyer Bainbridge, in the formation of the first all nuclear‑powered task group on 13 May. The force operated in the Mediterranean testing its unique capabilities until 31 July when it sailed under RADM Bernard M. Strean from Gibraltar on an around‑the‑world cruise. This operation, Sea Orbit, reminiscent of the cruise of the Great White Fleet in 1907–1909, demonstrated the strategic mobility of U.S. naval nuclear‑powered surface forces independent of normal fleet logistic support. Long Beach steamed over 30,000 nautical miles (56,000 km; 35,000 mi) in 58 days at an average speed of 25 knots (46 km/h; 29 mph), without being refueled or resupplied. In the course of the voyage, numerous foreign dignitaries visited the ship during visits off both coasts of Africa and in‑port calls at Karachi, Pakistan, Melbourne, Australia, Wellington, New Zealand and Rio de Janeiro, Brazil.

Long Beach returned to Norfolk from this cruise 3 October 1964 to join in exercises off the east coast and in the Caribbean. On 4 June 1965 she sailed for the Global Strategy Conference at the Naval War College, Newport, where Vice Admiral Kleber S. Masterson, Commander Second Fleet broke his flag on the ship. Back in Norfolk 23 June 1965, Long Beach resumed training and upkeep prior to her transfer to the Pacific Fleet. She sailed 28 February 1966 for her new home port and namesake, Long Beach, California, and arrived 15 March 1966.

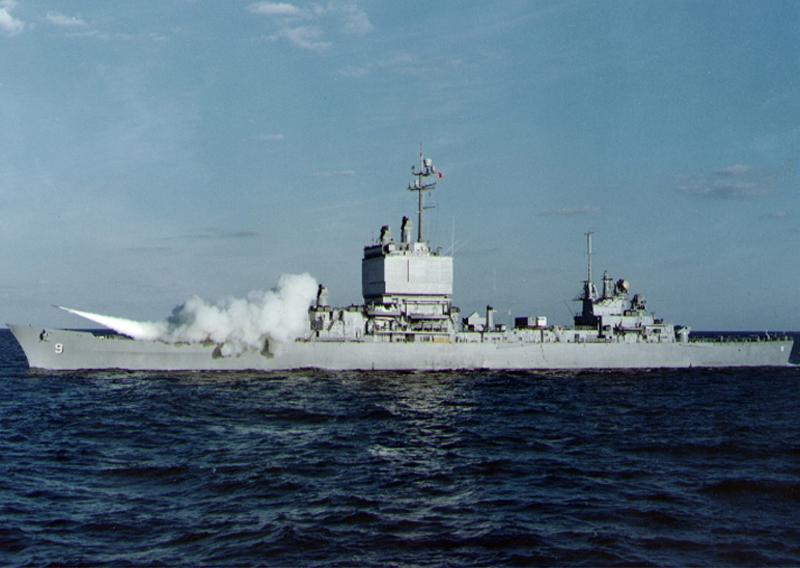
RIM-2 Terrier missile launch from USS Long Beach, October 1961

Mid 1966 was spent in training and orienting midshipmen in the tactics and operations involved in the modern nuclear Navy. After a period of leave and upkeep in the fall, Long Beach sailed 7 November 1966 from Long Beach for the Far East. During this initial cruise, the ship served primarily as the Positive Identification Radar Advisory Zone (PIRAZ) unit in the northern Gulf of Tonkin. As such, her main responsibility was to "sanitize" returning U.S. strike aircraft, ensuring that no enemy aircraft were attempting to evade identification by hiding amongst returning friendlies. Additionally, the ship provided support for an on-board search and rescue (SAR) helicopter unit. During this tour, Long Beach was responsible for directing the downing of one Soviet-made An-2 "Colt" aircraft that was attempting to engage South Vietnamese naval units. The shoot-down was executed by an F-4 Phantom II under the control of a Long Beach air intercept controller. The cruiser returned to Long Beach, California, in July 1967. In 1968, the ship was redeployed to the Gulf of Tonkin, shooting down a MiG-21 jet fighter near Vinh, with a RIM-8 Talos missile on 23 May 1968, at a range of 65 miles (105 km). In June of the same year, she downed another MiG, this one at 61 miles (98 km). She also directed other MiG kills by American fighters. She was the first ship to down an aircraft using SAMs in the Vietnam war and the incidents were not immediately publicized. Long Beach received a Navy Unit Commendation for the actions.

=== 1970s ===
Long Beach received a Combat Action Ribbon for action on 26 April 1972, a few days after the Battle of Đồng Hới. After Vietnam, Long Beach performed routine duties in the Western Pacific and Indian Ocean, performing escort duties for USS Enterprise in 1975, and participated in multi-national naval exercises while deployed in 1976–1977. Around this time, Long Beach was identified as being suitable for conversion to accommodate the newly developed Aegis combat system, as part of the plans for a force of nuclear-powered Aegis cruisers, but that plan was not implemented. In 1975 the ship changed home ports to Naval Base San Diego, California.

=== 1980s ===
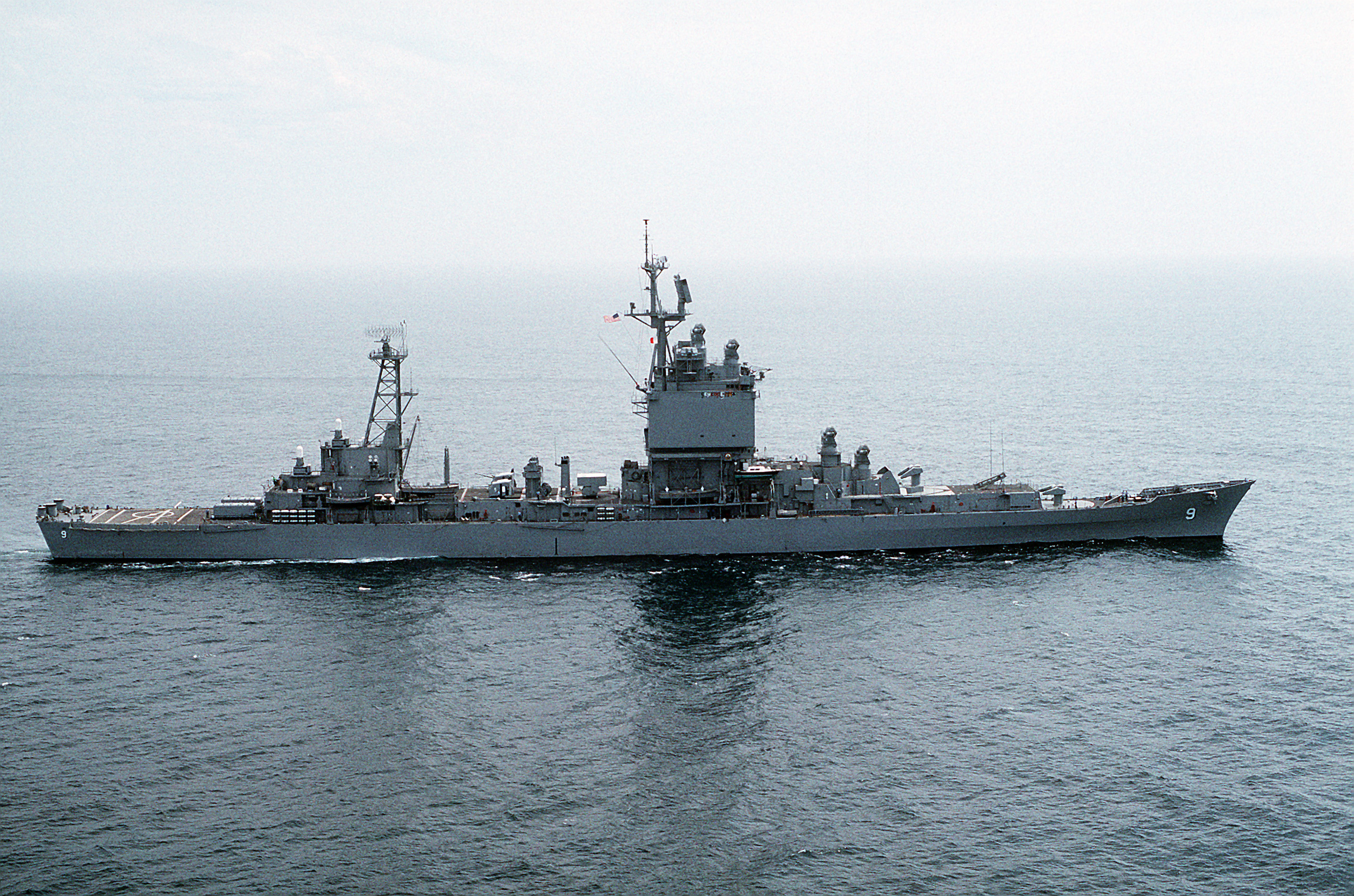
USS Long Beach c.1989

In 1980 the vessel rescued 114 Vietnamese boat people off the coast of Vietnam. In 1980, Long Beach returned to Puget Sound Naval Shipyard to undergo a mid-life conversion, during which time the SCANFAR system, consisting of the AN/SPS-32 and AN/SPS-33 radars, was removed from the forward superstructure and enhanced flagship facilities were installed, along with modern radars like the AN/SPS-48. The Standard SM-2ER missiles and the associated modern electronics replaced the obsolete Terrier system. In addition, two Phalanx CIWS close-in weapon systems were installed, along with two Harpoon surface-to-surface missile (SSM) launchers on the fantail. Beginning 5 January 1985 the BGM-109 Tomahawk cruise missile system was installed with two 4-cell Armored Box Launchers on the fantail, with the Harpoon launchers resited. On 19 October 1987, she participated in Kuwaiti tanker reflagging and provided anti-aircraft cover during Operation Nimble Archer. Long Beach deployed throughout the 1980s, conducting Tomahawk cruise missile test launches and exercises.

=== 1990s ===
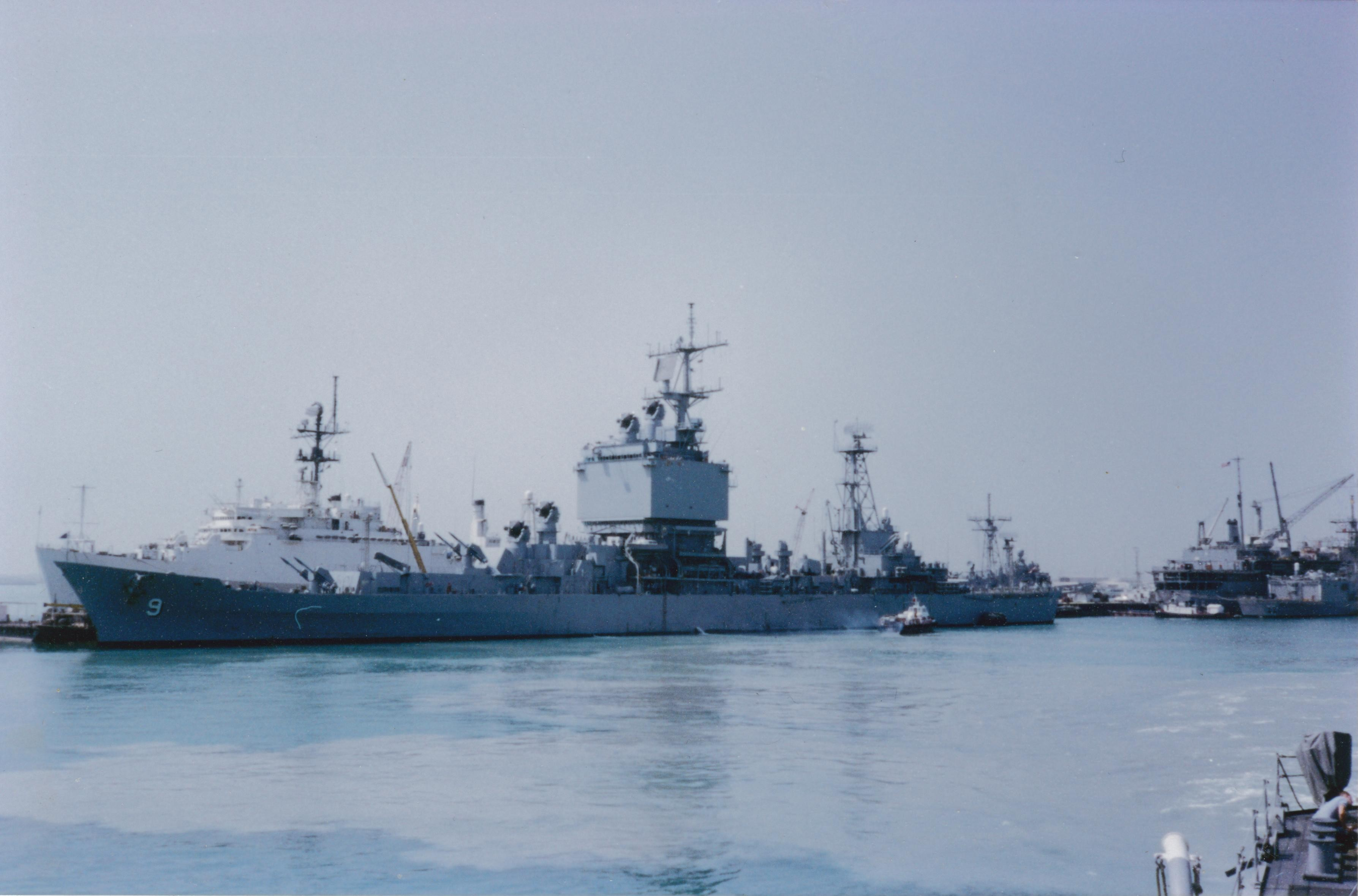
Long Beach, viewed from the deck of USS Truxtun (CGN-35), in the Persian Gulf, 1991

Long Beach served as an escort for the USS Missouri task force, and provided aircraft carrier escort support after the Gulf War of 1991. Long Beach deployed to the region beginning 28 May 1991 to support Operation Provide Comfort, which was after Operation Desert Storm was over and major hostilities had ended in late February 1991. In June, 1991, Long Beach took part in Operation Fiery Vigil, evacuating U.S. military personnel from two bases in the Philippines, Clark Air Base and U.S. Naval Base Subic Bay, during the volcanic eruption of Mount Pinatubo.

== Decommissioning ==
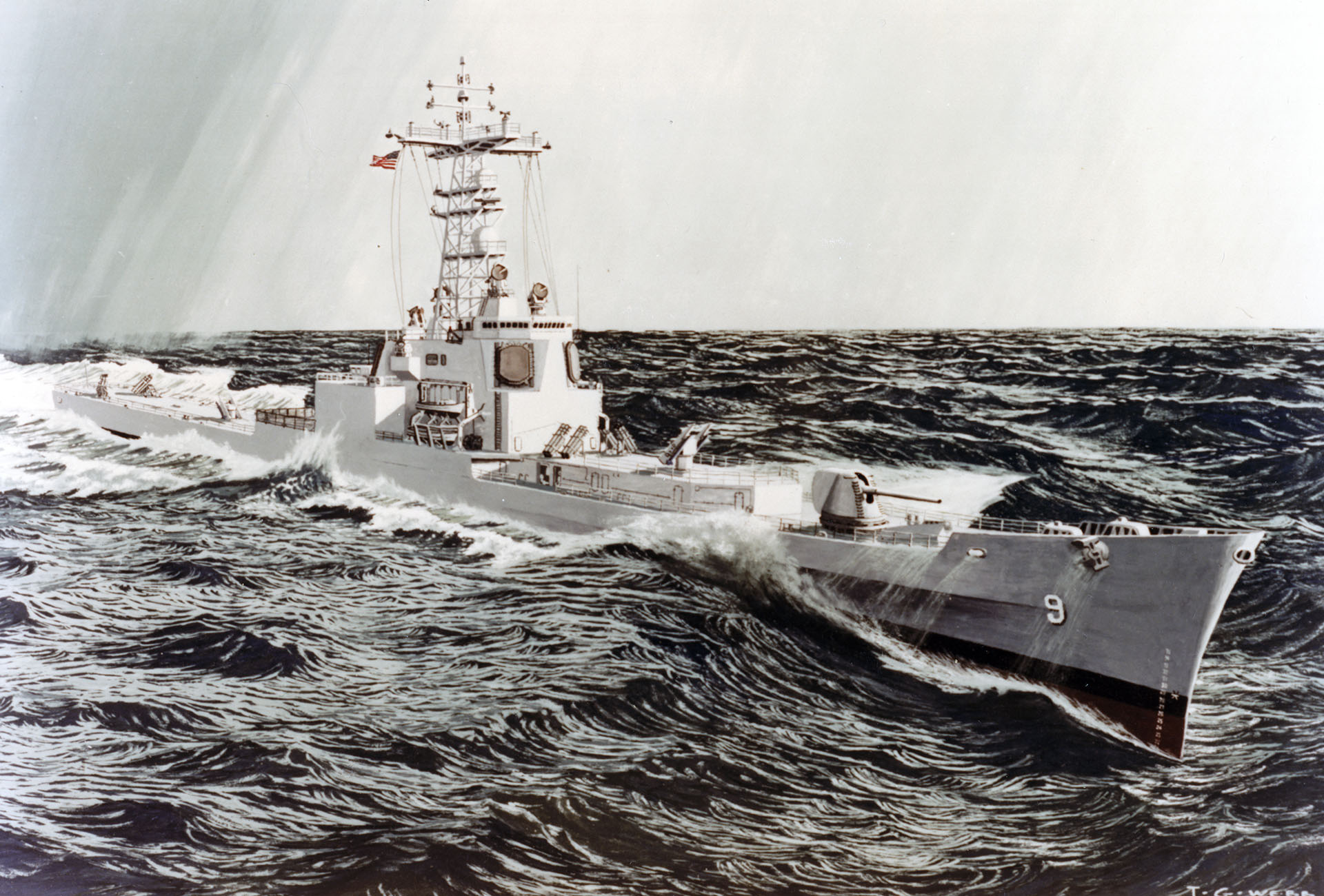
Artist's impression of Long Beach following conversion to Aegis cruiser

There was originally a plan to fully upgrade Long Beach with an Aegis Combat System in the early 1990s, requiring that her superstructure be completely rebuilt. Due to cuts in the defense budget after the 1991 Gulf War, as well as the higher operating costs and number of crew required compared to conventionally powered ships, the decision was made to decommission all nuclear cruisers from the Navy as their reactor cores ran down. They would be replaced by the Ticonderoga (CG) and Arleigh Burke (DDG) classes, designed from the ground up with Aegis. The Long Beach had been refueled during her 1970, 1980, and 1992 refits. The decision was made to decommission her in 1994.

A deactivation ceremony occurred on 2 July 1994 at Norfolk Naval Station, and the ship was then towed over to Newport News Shipbuilding where her entire superstructure was removed and her reactors were defueled. After this work was completed in the winter of 1995 the hull was towed through the Panama Canal to Puget Sound Naval Shipyard. Long Beach was stricken on 1 May 1995, more than 33 years after she had entered service. On 13 July 2012, Long Beach was sold at auction, for recycling, as prescribed for nuclear-powered vessels by Code 350, at the Puget Sound Naval Shipyard, Bremerton, Washington. As of May 2018, the inactivated ship's hull and reactor compartments largely remained in long-term storage there. In April 2026, the US Navy rejected calls to add the ship to the National Register or Historic Places (NRHP) and that the ship had major alterations which fundamentally changed its nature. It was still moored at the Puget Sound Naval Shipyard, but had its bow removed at the time of a review commissioned in December 2025 to determine its historical significance for the possibility of preservation.

A crew member aboard Long Beach may have been exposed to abnormal levels of radiation in 1963, and the ship was leaking radioactive coolant in 1991. At that time, four crew members alleged that the ship's reactor was unsafe and that crew working around it had been exposed to unsafe levels of radiation.

== Milestones ==
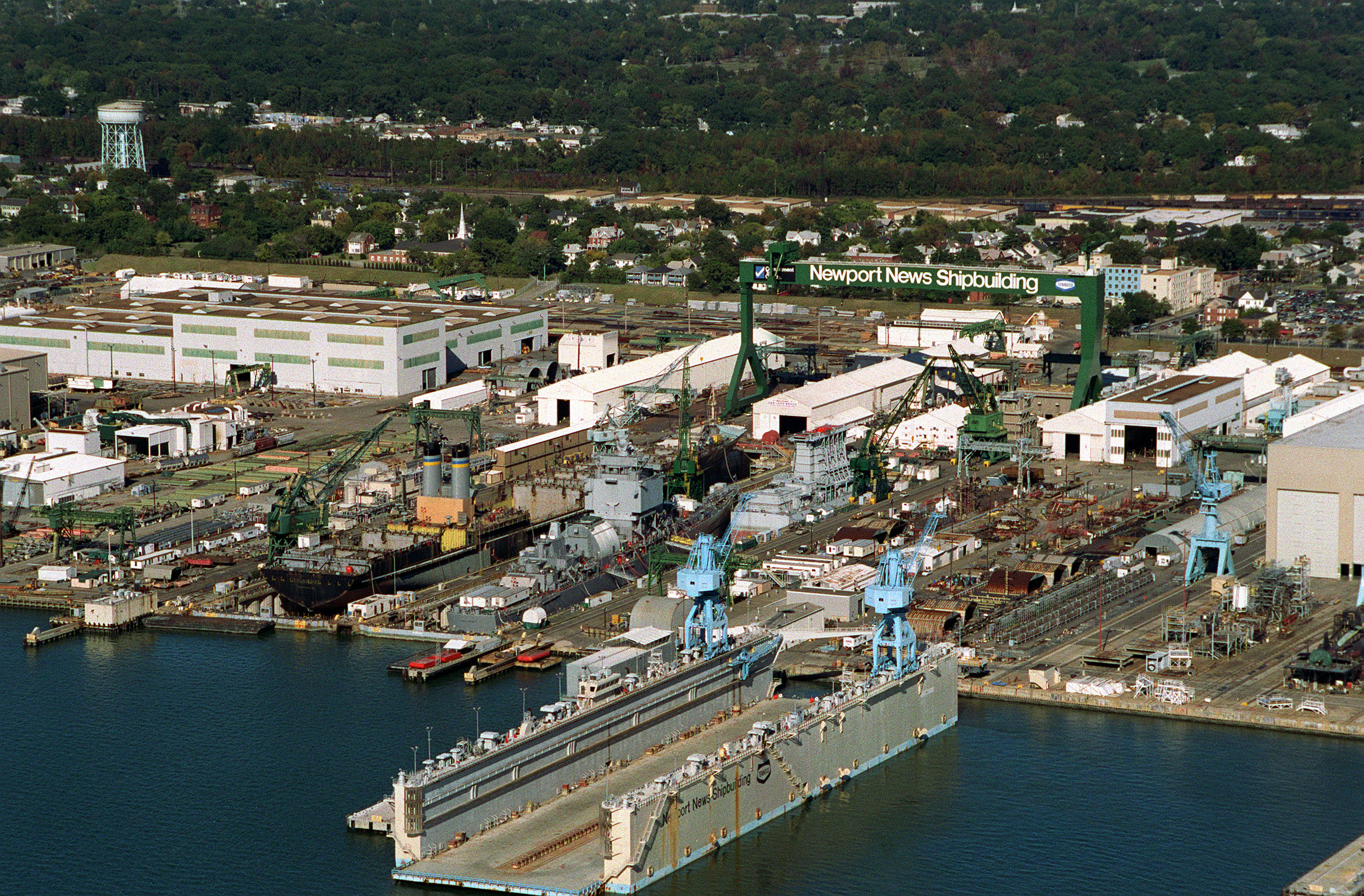
Aerial view of Newport News Shipbuilding & Drydock on the James River in Norfolk, Virginia 17 October 1994. In drydock No. 11 is USNS Gilliland prior to roll-on/roll-off ship conversion. In the drydock to the right of AKR-298 is Long Beach undergoing deactivation.

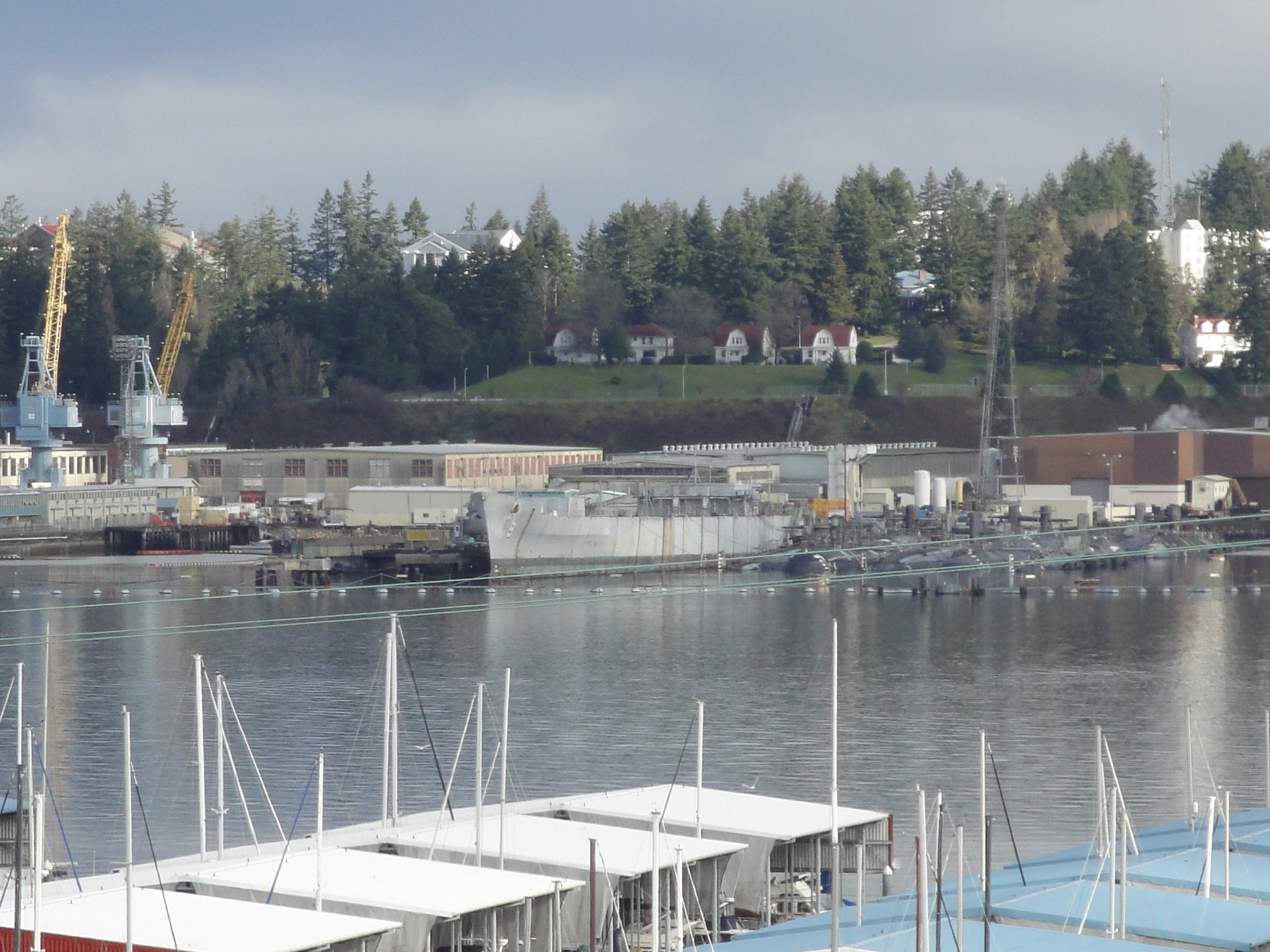
Hull of Long Beach sitting in Puget Sound Naval Shipyard awaiting recycling in March 2011. Picture taken from top of hill in Port Orchard looking north across the water to the shipyard

- 2 December 1957 – Keel laid in Bethlehem Steel Company's Fore River Shipyard, Quincy, Massachusetts.
- 14 July 1959 – launching; Mrs. Craig Hosmer christened the ship as her sponsor.
- 5 July 1961 – Long Beach underway for the first time using her own nuclear power.
- 9 September 1961 – Long Beach is commissioned as the first nuclear-powered surface vessel at the Boston Naval Shipyard.
- 2 October 1961 – Change of Home port to Norfolk, Virginia.
- 6 August 1963 – First deployment to the Mediterranean.
- 28 April 1964 – Second deployment to the Mediterranean for "Nuclear Task Force One".
- 15 March 1966 – Long Beach and City of Long Beach, California unite for first time.
- 7 November 1966 – First West Pacific deployment.
- 1 May 1967 – Deployed to Gulf of Tonkin.
- 9 December 1967 – Present at Long Beach to welcome RMS Queen Mary on her first call ever to her new home port.
- 15 April 1968 – Second West Pacific deployment.
- 11 August 1969 – Third West Pacific deployment.
- March 1970 – Overhaul at Mare Island Naval Shipyard in Vallejo, California.
- 1 July 1970 – Long Beach begins refueling at Mare Island Naval Shipyard.
- 28 March 1972 – Fourth West Pacific deployment.
- 1 May 1973 – Fifth West Pacific deployment.
- 7 November 1974 – Sixth West Pacific deployment.
- 7 June 1975 – Change of homeport to San Diego, Ca.
- 15 September 1976 – Seventh West Pacific deployment.
- 4 April 1978 – Eighth West Pacific deployment.
- 7 January 1980 – Ninth West Pacific deployment.
- 6 October 1980 – Begins Comprehensive Overhaul, Puget Sound Naval Shipyard.
- 13 January 1984 – 10th West Pacific deployment.
- 9 January 1985 – Selected Restricted Availability at Bremerton, Washington.
- 13 May 1986 – 11th West Pacific deployment.
- 25 July 1987 – 12th West Pacific deployment.
- 19 October 1987 – Participated in Kuwaiti tanker reflagging and provided anti-aircraft cover during Operation Nimble Archer.
- 13 October 1988 – North Atlantic Treaty Organization Ship Visit.
- 18 September 1989 – 13th West Pacific deployment/world cruise.
- 28 May 1991 – 14th West Pacific deployment in support of Operation Provide Comfort.
- 8 April 1992 – Comprehensive overhaul, Puget Sound Naval Shipyard.
- 12 May 1993 – Underway Counter Narcotics Patrol, Central America.
- 8 November 1993 – Underway Counter Narcotics Patrol, Caribbean.
- 6 May 1994 – Change of homeport to Norfolk, Virginia.
- 2 July 1994 – Deactivation ceremony, Norfolk Naval Station.
- Sept 2002 – Removal of superstructure, nuclear fuel removed. As of May 2018, a 423 foot section of the propulsion block remains at PSNS.
- Oct 2012 - Auctioned off and sold for scrapping

== Awards ==

Combat Action Ribbon
Joint Meritorious Unit Award with 1 oak leaf cluster	Navy Unit Commendation	Meritorious Unit Commendation with 1 star
Navy E Ribbon with wreathed Battle "E" Device	National Defense Service Medal with 1 star	Armed Forces Expeditionary Medal with 1 star
Vietnam Service Medal with 6 stars	Southwest Asia Service Medal with 1 star	Humanitarian Service Medal
Sea Service Deployment Ribbon with 8 stars	Special Operations Service Ribbon	Vietnam Campaign Medal

Combat Action Ribbon

- 26 April 1972

Joint Meritorious Unit Award

- 16 October 1990 – 18 November 1990
- 10 June 1991 – 28 June 1991 Operation Fiery Vigil

Navy Unit Commendation

- 7 May 1968 – 20 October 1968

Meritorious Unit Commendation

- 19 November 1966 – 8 June 1967
- 10 April 1972 – 30 November 1972

Battle Efficiency Award

- 1 July 1977 – 31 December 1978
- 1 January 1985 – 30 June 1986
- 1 July 1986 – 31 December 1987
- 1 January 1988 – 30 June 1989
- 1 January 1991 – 31 December 1992
- 1 January 1993 – 31 December 1993

Armed Forces Expeditionary Medal

- 1 September 1987 – 2 September 1987 Persian Gulf
- 20 September 1987 – 26 September 1987 Persian Gulf
- 29 September 1987 – 28 October 1987 Persian Gulf
- 30 October 1987 – 29 November 1987 Persian Gulf
- 17 January 1990 – 31 January 1990 Persian Gulf

Vietnam Service Medal

- 29 November 1966 – 6 January 1967
- 1 February 1967 – 1 March 1967
- 12 March 1967 – 7 April 1967
- 5 May 1967 – 13 June 1967
- 4 May 1968 – 11 June 1968
- 21 June 1968 – 11 July 1968
- 13 July 1968 – 7 August 1968
- 12 September 1968 – 23 October 1968
- 3 September 1969 – 11 October 1969
- 26 October 1969 – 4 December 1969
- 10 December 1969 – 12 December 1969
- 20 December 1969 – 22 December 1969
- 1 January 1970 – 25 January 1970
- 13 April 1972 – 23 June 1972
- 1 July 1972 – 31 July 1972
- 8 August 1972 – 6 September 1972
- 15 September 1972 – 16 October 1972
- 25 October 1972 – 22 November 1972

Southwest Asia Service Medal

- 6 July 1991 – 12 October 1991

Humanitarian Service Medal

- 29 April 1980 Vietnamese boat people
- 1 May 1980 Vietnamese boat people

Coast Guard Special Operations Service Ribbon

- 15 November 1993

== See also ==
- List of cruisers of the United States Navy
- Nuclear-powered cruisers of the United States Navy
