= Irene Gifford =

American politician

The Honourable Irene Gifford

Member of the Maine House of Representatives from the 28th district
- Incumbent
- Assumed office December 7, 2022
- Preceded by: Chris Caiazzo

Personal details
- Party: Republican
- Spouse: Jeffery Gifford
- Children: 3
- Profession: Hairdresser

Irene Gifford is an American politician who serves as a member of the Maine House of Representatives since December 7, 2022. She represents Maine's 28th House district.

== Electoral history ==
She was elected on November 8, 2022, in the 2022 Maine House of Representatives election. She assumed office on December 7, 2022.

== Biography ==
Gifford graduated from Mattanawcook Academy.

Maine House of Representatives
Preceded by Christopher Caiazzo	Member of the Maine House of Representatives; 2022–present	Succeeded by incumbent
