= Jeffery Gifford =

American politician (1946–2022)

Member of the Maine House of Representatives from the 142nd district
- In office 2020 – June 12, 2022

Member of the Maine House of Representatives from the 12th district
- In office 2006–2014

Personal details
- Born: August 4, 1946
- Died: June 12, 2022 (aged 75)
- Party: Republican
- Spouse: Irene Gifford
- Children: 3

Jeffery Allen Gifford (August 4, 1946 – June 12, 2022) was an American politician. Gifford served as a Republican member of the Maine House of Representatives, representing the House District 12 from 2006 until 2014. He served on the House Agriculture, Conservation and Forestry Committee (third-term), and then House District 142 from 2020 until his death on June 12, 2022. He was first elected in 2006, was re-elected in 2008, 2010 and 2012. He was elected again in 2020 in what was by this time House District 142. He was running for reelection in the redrawn and renumbered House District 28 at the time of his death.

Gifford was married to his wife Irene Gifford and had three children, eight grandchildren and one great-grandchild. He worked in the pulp and paper industry and was a member of the Pulp & Paperworkers Resource Council which lobbies for legislation and policies that effect jobs in this industry. He coached Pop Warner football for twenty-five years and lived in Lincoln, Maine.

Gifford died from cancer on June 12, 2022, at the age of 75.
