= MV Gary I. Gordon =

Cargo ship of the United States Navy

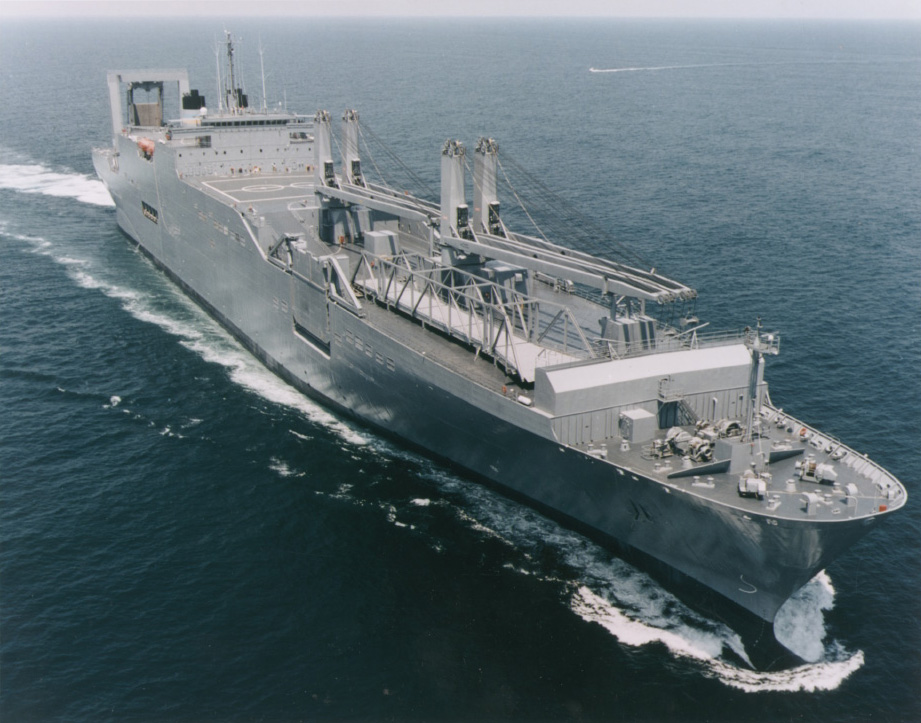

History

United States
- Name: USNS Gordon
- Namesake: Gary Gordon
- Operator: Military Sealift Command
- Builder: Burmeister & Wain Shipyard Denmark
- Launched: 12 September 1972
- Completed: 1 June 1973
- In service: 23 August 1996
- Renamed: Built as MV Jutlandia in 1972
- Stricken: 26 April 2023
- Identification: IMO number: 7234430; MMSI number: 367834000; Callsign: NAKL
- Status: Stricken, in Ready Reserve Force

General characteristics
- Class & type: Gordon-class roll on roll off vehicle cargo ship
- Displacement: 32,589 t.(lt) 65,000 t.(fl)
- Length: 954 ft (291 m)
- Beam: 105 ft 9 in (32.23 m)
- Draft: 36 ft (11 m)
- Propulsion: 1 × Burmeister & Wain 12K84EF diesel; 26,000 hp(m) (19.11 MW); 2 × Burmeister & Wain 9K84EF diesels, 39,000 hp(m) (28.66 MW); 3 shafts (center cp prop) bow thruster
- Speed: 24 knots (44 km/h)
- Capacity: 284,064 sq ft (26,390.4 m^{2}); 49,991 sq ft (4,644.3 m^{2}) deck cargo
- Complement: 12 reduced / up to 45 full, civilian mariners; 50 US Navy personnel

MV Gary I. Gordon, formerly USNS Gordon (T-AKR-296), is a Gordon-class Large, Medium-Speed Roll-on/Roll-off vehicle cargo ship of the United States Navy. She was originally built as a merchant vessel, acquired and converted by the Navy, and was assigned to the United States Department of Defense's Military Sealift Command. As of April 2023, the ship was part of the United States Maritime Administration (MARAD) Ready Reserve Force (RRF).

Gordon was built in Denmark in 1972 as MV Jutlandia, and entered commercial service on 1 June 1973. After some time spent in commercial service she was lengthened by Hyundai Heavy Industries in 1984, and later went on to be acquired by the US Navy under a long-term charter. She was converted to a US Navy Vehicle Roll-on/Roll-off Ship at Newport News Shipbuilding and Drydock Company and on delivery to the Navy was assigned to the Military Sealift Command on 23 August 1996 under the name USNS Gordon, after Medal of Honor recipient Master Sergeant Gary Gordon. Gordon was one of 28 Strategic Sealift Ships operated by the Military Sealift Command. She was assigned to the MSC Atlantic surge force and was maintained at Canton, Baltimore, Maryland in Reduced Operational Status 4, meaning she can be on her way to pick up cargo within 4 days of notification.

On 26 April 2023, Gordon was stricken from the Naval Vessel Register. The same day, Gordon was transferred to the United States Maritime Administration (MARAD) Ready Reserve Force (RRF) and renamed Gary I. Gordon also losing the USNS designation. If activated, Gary I. Gordon will report to the Military Sealift Command and change her prefix designation from MV to USNS. Gary I. Gordon is maintained in a reduced operating status and the crew is provided by commercial companies under contract to MARAD.

As of March 2024, Gary I. Gordon resided in Baltimore harbor.
