= State Theatre (Portland, Maine) =

Theater in Portland, Maine

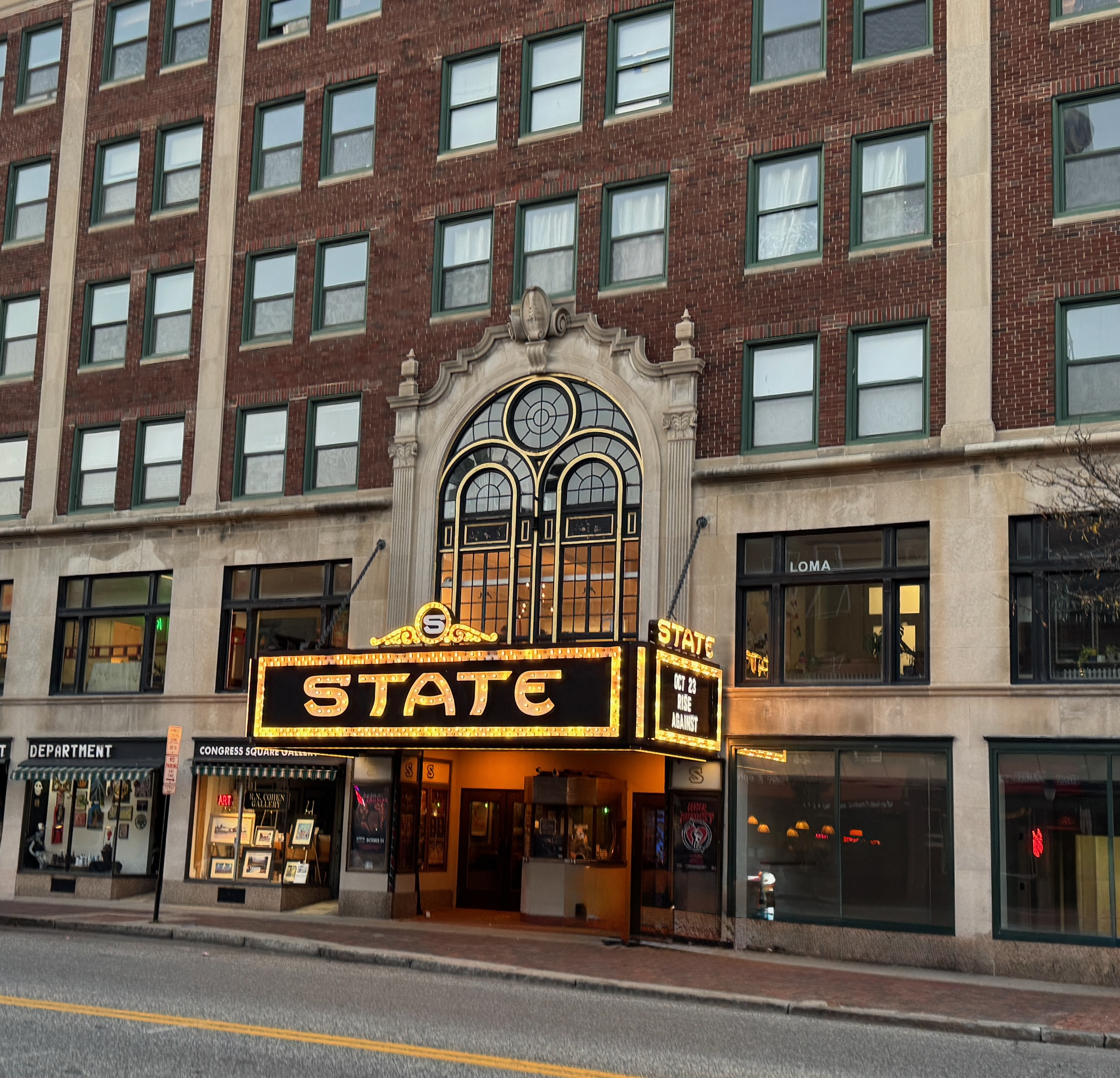
- Pictured in 2024
- Interactive map of State Theatre
- Address: 609 Congress Street
- Location: Portland, Maine
- Coordinates: 43°39′14″N 70°15′49″W
- Owner: Crostone, LLC
- Operator: State Theatre Presents : Crobo LLC
- Capacity: 1,870
- Type: Theatre

Construction
- Opened: November 8, 1929
- Architect: Herbert W. Rhodes

Website
- statetheatreportland.com

The State Theatre is a historic theater located at 609 Congress Street, at its intersection with High Street, in downtown Portland, Maine, which features a combination of Moorish and Art Deco architecture. It reopened as a 1,870-seat performing arts venue in 2010.

== History ==
The State Theatre was designed by Portland architect Herbert W. Rhodes, originally containing 2,300 seats. The building it is located in replaced the Charles Libby Mansion. The theatre was designed to include Spanish, Italian, and Art Deco aesthetics. Furnishings included wrought iron stairs, bronze doors, tapestry rugs hung from vaulted ceilings decorated with moldings and paintings, four Spanish balconies, and a Wurlitzer organ. The theatre was equipped with three projectors and a magniscope, which produced a large picture.

The State Theatre's doors opened to the public for the first time on November 8, 1929, to 2,200 invited patrons for Gloria Swanson's first talkie, The Trespasser. The State Theatre served as a top-tier first-run motion picture house for over 30 years. Tickets were ten cents to a quarter. The State only flirted briefly with silent films and vaudeville before transitioning completely to Hollywood's biggest first-run sound films of the day. In the mid-1930s the State Theatre began a children's matinee program, showing the most popular cartoons of the day, such as Bugs Bunny, Porky Pig, and Popeye. The weekly radio show Recess Time was also recorded Saturday mornings. Roughly fifteen kids would answer trivia questions to win a cash prize between fifty cents and a dollar.

In the late 1940s through the 1960s the State Theatre expanded its programming to include theatrical and dance productions. It also held other various events and contests, all in addition to major Hollywood films. A large part of the programming expansion was due to growing competition from television. In 1963, then-manager and director Ralph Tully retired. Edith Francis, who had worked at the theater for seventeen years, took his place. In the coming years the State Theatre fell on hard times, which climaxed when Francis died after being hit by a car at a nearby intersection. To prevent it from being torn down, the State Theatre was leased as an adult movie venue by the American Theater Corporation. Other local theatrical venues such as the Civic, the Empire, and the Strand were torn down by the city.

The State Theatre ended its days as a porn theater in 1990. The American Theater Corporation had allowed it to fall into horrible disrepair, and many of the State's original chairs, marquees, tapestries, and memorabilia were lost or stolen. The new owners, Nick and Lola Kampf, hired local architect Scott Simmons to help restore the State's glory. The State reopened on November 20, 1993, to much acclaim. After operating it successfully for a year the owners leased the theater to a locally formed non-profit headed by Kelley Graves and board member Scott Simon, believing it would insure its future in the community. Unfortunately, due to mismanagement, in 1997 the non-profit went bankrupt, returning control to the owners, who rented it on an event basis till the property's sale in 2000 to local realtor Mat Orne.

In 2000 Grant Wilson Jr., of Stone Coast Brewing took ownership control of the State Theatre building and reopened the venue with a new energy, hoping to capitalize on the strong live music industry in the Northeast. However, the State still had its problems. The wiring was absolutely ancient, and worse, fire escapes all over the building were in disrepair. Throughout the next six years the State struggled to meet code enforcement regulations and only held concerts sporadically after 2003 before disputes about who would pay for repairs finally closed its doors again in 2006.

It reopened in 2010 after The Bowery Presents from New York City and Alex Crothers from Higher Ground in Burlington, Vermont, signed an agreement to extensively renovate the property. $1.5 million were spent on repairs to bring the aging building back to code and to outfit it as a modern performing arts venue.

Since its grand reopening in October 2010 under the partnership of Crothers and The Bowery Presents as well as general manager and talent buyer Lauren Wayne, the State Theatre has hosted such acts as the Avett Brothers, boygenius, Elvis Costello, Skrillex, Bassnectar, Trey Anastasio, Mastodon, Gillian Welch, Iron & Wine, Bright Eyes, Excision, Pixies, The Flaming Lips, Flux Pavilion, Pretty Lights, FUN, Of Monsters of Men, MGMT, Queens of the Stone Age, Yes, Arctic Monkeys, and Aziz Ansari.

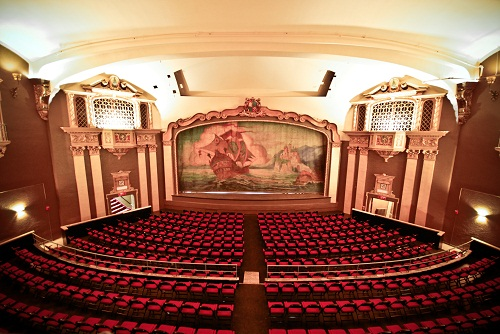
The interior of the State Theatre after the 2010 renovations
