= Heather Sirocki =

American politician

Member of the Maine House of Representatives from the 28th district
- In office December 1, 2010 – December 4, 2018
- Preceded by: Peggy Pendleton
- Succeeded by: Chris Caiazzo

Personal details
- Born: Scarborough, Maine
- Party: Republican

Heather Sirocki is an American politician who served in the Maine House of Representatives from 2010 to 2018.
