= Gary Gordon =

United States Army Medal of Honor recipient (1960–1993)

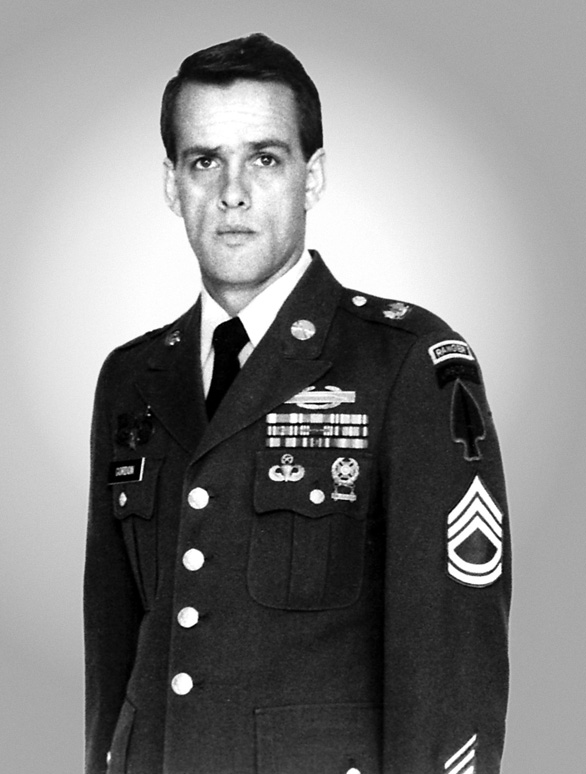
- Born: August 30, 1960; Lincoln, Maine, United States
- Died: October 3, 1993 (aged 33); Mogadishu, Somalia
- Burial place: West Broadway Cemetery, Lincoln, Maine
- Military career
- Allegiance: United States
- Branch: United States Army
- Service years: 1978–1993
- Rank: Master sergeant
- Nickname: "Gordy"
- Units: 10th Special Forces Group; 1st Special Forces Operational Detachment-Delta
- Conflicts: Operation Just Cause; Persian Gulf War; Operation Gothic Serpent; Battle of Mogadishu †
- Awards: Medal of Honor; Purple Heart; Meritorious Service Medal; Army Commendation Medal

Gary Ivan Gordon (August 30, 1960 – October 3, 1993) was a master sergeant in the United States Army and a recipient of the Medal of Honor. At the time of his death in the Battle of Mogadishu in 1993, he was a non-commissioned officer in the United States Army's premier special operations unit, the 1st Special Forces Operational Detachment-Delta (1SFOD-D), or "Delta Force". Together with his fellow soldier Sergeant First Class Randy Shughart, Gordon was posthumously awarded the Medal of Honor for his actions during the battle.

== Early life and career ==
Gary Gordon was born August 30, 1960, in Lincoln, Maine, and graduated from Mattanawcook Academy in 1978. On December 4 of that year, at age 18, he joined the U.S. Army. Trained as a combat engineer, Gordon became a Special Forces Engineer with the 2nd Battalion of the 10th Special Forces Group. In December 1986, he volunteered and was selected to join the 1st Special Forces Operational Detachment-Delta (1SFOD-D), or Delta Force. As a Delta operator, Gordon eventually advanced to Team Sergeant. Before deploying to Somalia, he married his wife Carmen and they had two children, Brittany and Ian.

== Combat and death in Somalia ==
Gordon was posted to Mogadishu, Somalia, with other Delta members in the summer of 1993 as part of Task Force Ranger. On October 3, 1993, Gordon was Sniper Team Leader during the Battle of Mogadishu (1993), which began as a joint-force mission to apprehend key advisers to Somali warlord Mohamed Farrah Aidid. During the assault, Super Six One, one of the Army's Black Hawk helicopters providing insertion and air support to the assault team, was shot down and crashed in the city. A combat search and rescue team was dispatched to the first crash site to secure it and a short time later a second Black Hawk, Super Six Four, was shot down as well. Ranger forces on the ground were not able to assist the downed helicopter crew of the second crash site as they were already engaged in heavy combat with Aidid's militia while making their way to the first crash site.

Gordon and his Delta Force sniper teammates Sergeant First Class Randy Shughart and Sergeant First Class Brad Halling, who were providing sniper cover from the air, wanted to be dropped at the second crash site in order to protect the four critically wounded crew, despite the fact that large numbers of armed, hostile combatants were converging on the area. Mission commanders denied Gordon's request, saying that the situation was already too dangerous for the three Delta snipers to effectively protect the Black Hawk crew from the ground. Command's position was that the snipers could be of more assistance by continuing to provide air cover. Gordon, however, concluded that there was no way the Black Hawk crew could survive on their own, and repeated his request twice until he finally received permission. Halling had assumed control of a minigun after a crew chief was injured and was not inserted with Shughart and Gordon.

Once on the ground, Gordon and Shughart, armed with only their personal weapons and sidearms, fought their way to the downed Black Hawk. By this time more Somali forces were arriving, intent on either capturing or killing the American servicemen. When they reached Super Six Four, Gordon and Shughart extracted the pilot, Chief Warrant Officer Michael Durant, co-pilot Ray Frank, and crew chiefs Bill Cleveland and Tommy Field from the aircraft, and established defensive positions around the crash site. Despite having inflicted heavy casualties on their attackers, the two Delta snipers were outnumbered and outgunned. Their ammunition depleted, Gordon and Shughart were killed by Somali gunfire. It is believed that Gordon was the first to be killed. Shughart retrieved Gordon's CAR-15 and gave it to Durant to use. Shortly afterwards, Shughart was killed and Durant was taken alive. Immediately after the battle, Mohammed's troops counted 25 of their own men dead with many more severely wounded. According to America and Iraq: Policy-making, Intervention and Regional Politics, Gordon's "half-naked body was dragged horrifically through the streets of Mogadishu".

Gordon's body was eventually recovered and is buried in Lincoln Cemetery, Penobscot County, Maine.

There was some confusion in the aftermath of the action as to the final moments of the firefight. The official citation states that Shughart had been killed first but Mark Bowden, author of Black Hawk Down: A Story of Modern War, a book about the October 1993 battle, relates an account by Sergeant Paul R. Howe, another Delta commando fighting in the battle. Howe said that he heard Shughart call for help on the radio. Furthermore, Durant believed that the weapon handed to him was not the distinctive M14 used by Shughart but a CAR-15; Howe said that Gordon would never have given his own weapon to another soldier to use while he was still able to fight. In Durant's book, In the Company of Heroes, he states that Gordon was on the left side of the Black Hawk, after both he and Shughart moved Durant to a safer location, and only heard Gordon say, "Damn, I'm hit." Durant acknowledged that he might have been wrong in his identification but was reluctant to push for the record to be changed since he was not sure.

After the terrorist attack on the United States on September 11, 2001, United States Special Forces units were inserted into Afghanistan to assist the Northern Alliance forces in overthrowing the Taliban and al-Qaeda terrorists. Following an intense mountain battle known as Operation Anaconda in March 2002, U.S. troops complex found a GPS unit and pouch labeled "G. Gordon". Intelligence analysts believed at first this was Gordon's GPS unit that he purchased on the private market and used in Somalia. The Gordon family was notified immediately of the find before the information was released to the public. It ultimately turned out that it was not Gordon's GPS but one belonging to a helicopter pilot lost in an earlier fight during Operation Anaconda.

== Honors and awards ==
MSG Gordon's personal decorations include:

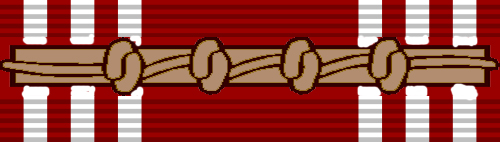

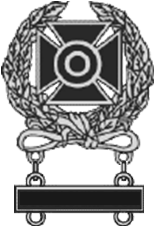

Combat Infantryman Badge with star (denoting second award)
Medal of Honor
Purple Heart	Meritorious Service Medal	Army Commendation Medal
Joint Service Achievement Medal with 1 Oak leaf cluster	Army Achievement Medal with 1 Oak leaf cluster	Army Good Conduct Medal with four bronze loops
National Defense Service Medal	Armed Forces Expeditionary Medal	Humanitarian Service Medal
Non-Commissioned Officer Professional Development Ribbon with Award numeral 3	Army Service Ribbon	United Nations Medal
French Army Mountaineering Badge	Royal Danish Parachutist Badge	
Master Parachutist Badge	Military Freefall Parachutist Badge	Expert Marksmanship badge with rifle component bar
Special Forces Tab		Ranger Tab
Joint Meritorious Unit Award		Valorous Unit Award

The U.S. Navy officially named a roll-on/roll-off ship USNS Gordon in a ceremony at 10:00 a.m., Thursday, July 4, 1996, at Newport News, Virginia. Congressman John Murtha of Pennsylvania, was the ceremony's principal speaker and Gordon's widow, Carmen Gordon, served as the ship's sponsor. Gordon was the second ship to undergo conversion from a commercial container vessel to a Large Medium Speed Roll On/Roll Off (LMSR) sealift ship and is operated by the U.S. Navy's Military Sealift Command, Washington, D.C.

Gordon has been honored elsewhere as well. Gordon Elementary School in Linden Oaks, Harnett County, North Carolina, which opened in January 2009, was named in his honor. The school is near Fort Bragg, where Gordon was stationed before being deployed to Somalia. In the Joint Readiness Training Center at Fort Polk, LA, the main mock city is named Shughart-Gordon.

On Wednesday, June 11, 2025, President Donald Trump announced the renaming of then Fort Eisenhower to Fort Gordon, this time honoring MSG Gary Gordon.

=== Medal of Honor ===
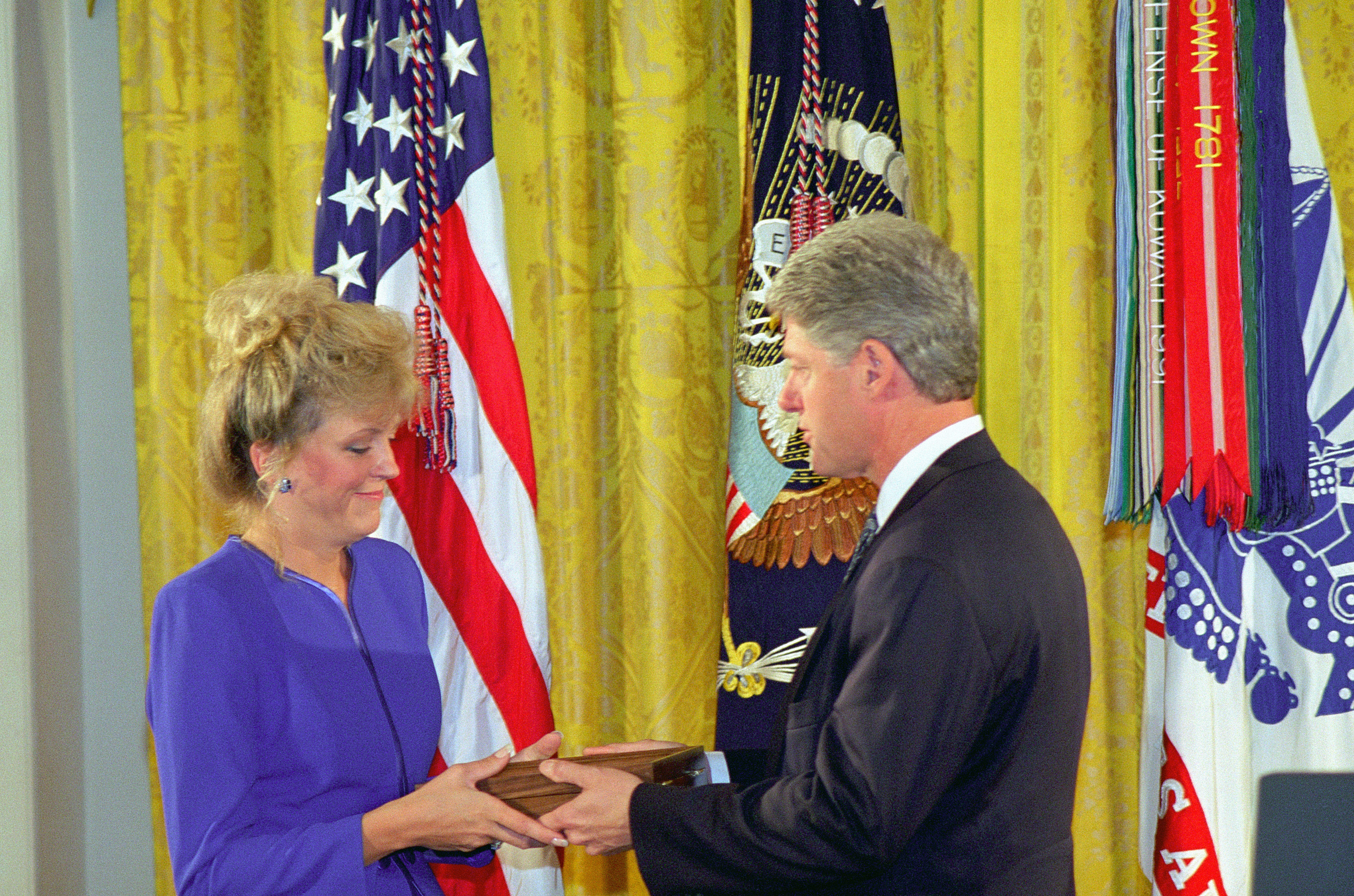
President Clinton presents the Medal of Honor to Carmen, the widow of Master Sergeant Gary I. Gordon.

On May 23, 1994, both Gordon and Shughart posthumously received the Medal of Honor in recognition for the actions they took and the sacrifices they made to help protect the lives of the crew of Super Six Four. They were the only soldiers participating in Operation Gothic Serpent to receive the military's highest honor, and the first Medal of Honor recipients since the Vietnam War. Their medals were presented to their widows Stephanie Shughart and Carmen Gordon by Bill Clinton in a ceremony at the White House.

=== Medal of Honor citation ===

Master Sergeant Gary Ivan Gordon, United States Army, distinguished himself by actions above and beyond the call of duty on 3 October 1993, while serving as Sniper Team Leader, United States Army Special Operations Command with Task Force Ranger in Mogadishu, Somalia. Master Sergeant Gordon's sniper team provided precision fires from the lead helicopter during an assault and at two helicopter crash sites, while subjected to intense automatic weapons and rocket propelled grenade fires. When Master Sergeant Gordon learned that ground forces were not immediately available to secure the second crash site, he and another sniper unhesitatingly volunteered to be inserted to protect the four critically wounded personnel, despite being well aware of the growing number of enemy personnel closing in on the site. After his third request to be inserted, Master Sergeant Gordon received permission to perform his volunteer mission. When debris and enemy ground fires at the site caused them to abort the first attempt, Master Sergeant Gordon was inserted one hundred meters south of the crash site. Equipped with only his sniper rifle and a pistol, Master Sergeant Gordon and his fellow sniper, while under intense small arms fire from the enemy, fought their way through a dense maze of shanties and shacks to reach the critically injured crew members. Master Sergeant Gordon immediately pulled the pilot and the other crew members from the aircraft, establishing a perimeter which placed him and his fellow sniper in the most vulnerable position. Master Sergeant Gordon used his long range rifle and side arm to kill an undetermined number of attackers until he depleted his ammunition. Master Sergeant Gordon then went back to the wreckage, recovering some of the crew's weapons and ammunition. Despite the fact that he was critically low on ammunition, he provided some of it to the dazed pilot and then radioed for help. Master Sergeant Gordon continued to travel the perimeter, protecting the downed crew. After his team member was fatally wounded and his own rifle ammunition exhausted, Master Sergeant Gordon returned to the wreckage, recovering a rifle with the last five rounds of ammunition and gave it to the pilot with the words, "good luck." Then, armed only with his pistol, Master Sergeant Gordon continued to fight until he was fatally wounded. His actions saved the pilot's life. Master Sergeant Gordon's extraordinary heroism and devotion to duty were in keeping with the highest standards of military service and reflect great credit upon him, his unit and the United States Army.

== Namesakes ==
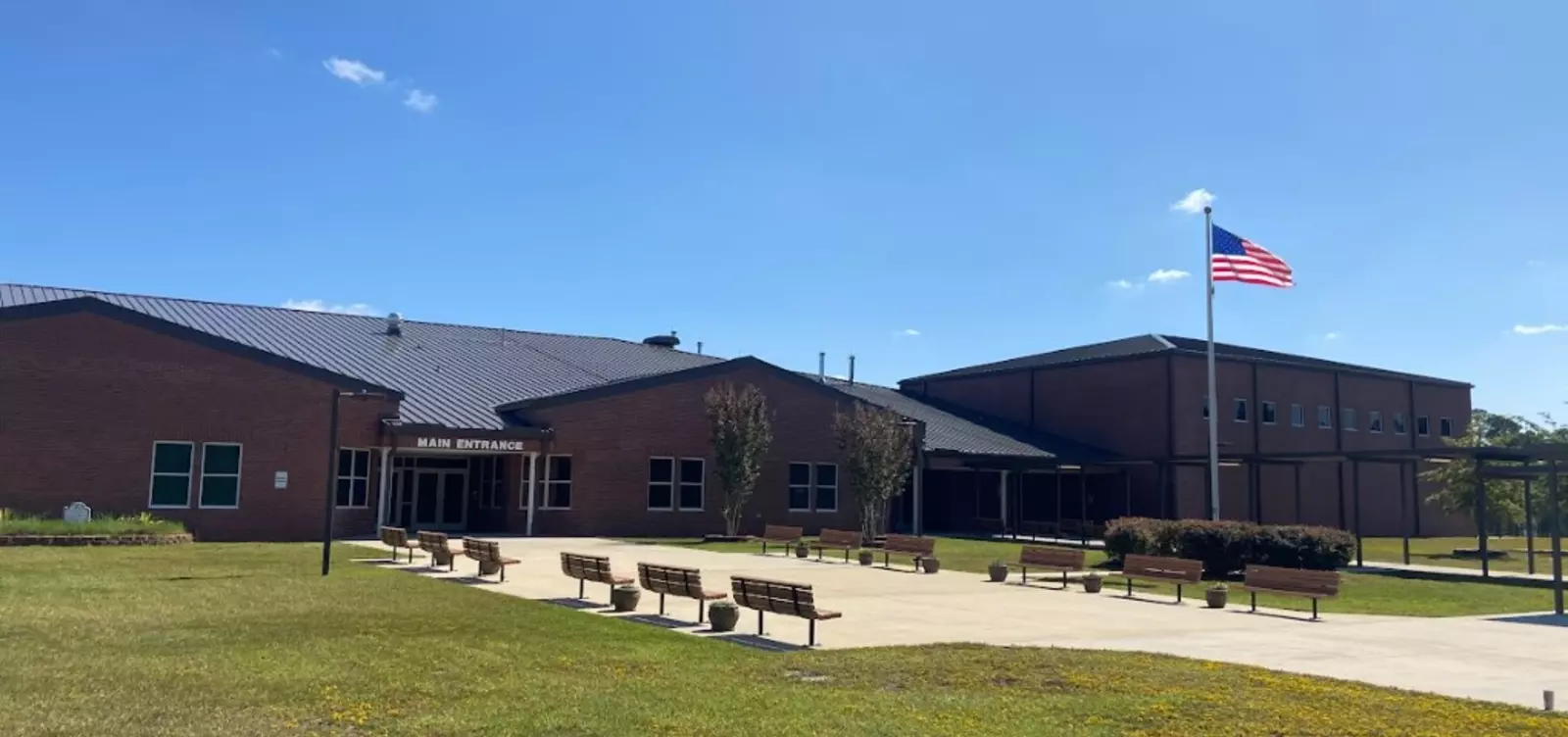
Gordon Elementary School

Gary Ivan Gordon Elementary School in Fort Bragg.

Fort Gordon, an Army installation in Augusta, Georgia, was renamed after him in 2025, having originally been named after Confederate general John B. Gordon and later renamed after President Dwight D. Eisenhower.

== In culture ==
In the 2001 film Black Hawk Down, Gordon was portrayed by Danish actor Nikolaj Coster-Waldau.

Marko Kloos’ novel, Lines of Departure (2014), centers around a space fleet containing the military freighter "Gary I Gordon" and Gordon's heroic actions in Somalia are referenced.

== See also ==
- 160th Special Operations Aviation Regiment (Airborne), the "Night Stalkers"
- List of post-Vietnam Medal of Honor recipients
- Operation Restore Hope
- U.S. Army Special Forces
- U.S. Special Operations Forces
- 1st Special Forces Operational Detachment-Delta
- Statue of Gary Gordon
