= SCANFAR =

US Navy long range phased array radar

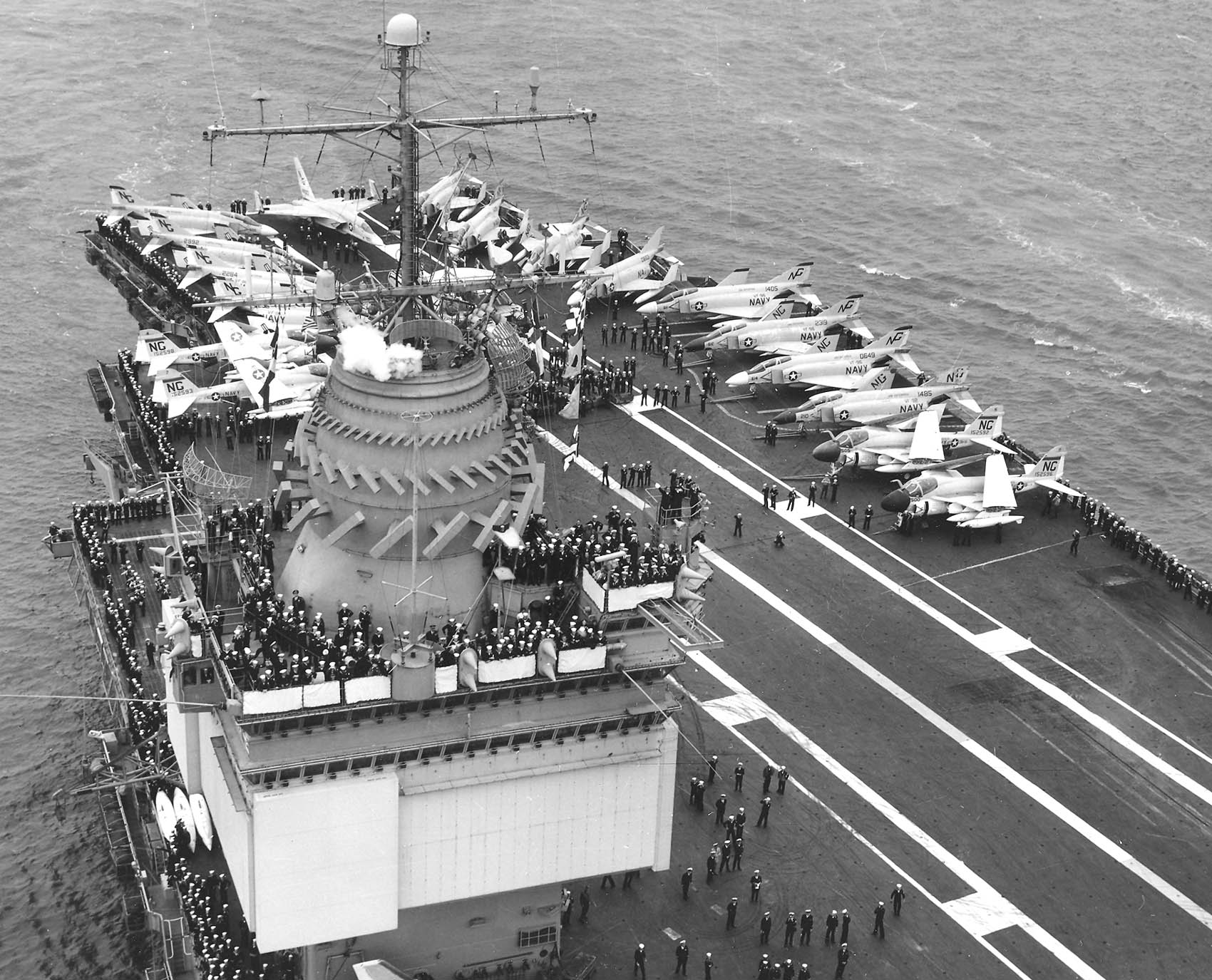
- SCANFAR Radars (SPS-32, SPS-33) on USS Enterprise
- Country of origin: United States
- Designer: Hughes Aircraft Company
- Frequency: P-band
- PRF: 200 (SPS-32)
- Beamwidth: 7° × 50° (SPS-32)
- Pulsewidth: 20 𝜇s
- Range: 400 nmi (740 km)
- Power: 1.5 MW (SPS-32)

The Hughes SCANFAR was the first phased array radar system to be deployed by the US Navy, installed on USS Long Beach (CGN-9) and USS Enterprise (CVN-65). It consisted of two search radars, the AN/SPS-32 and the AN/SPS-33. In 1982, the system was removed from Long Beach, and was replaced by the AN/SPS-48 during a comprehensive overhaul. Aboard the Long Beach, the system used AN/SPG-55 radars for missile guidance.

Despite its failure to enter widespread service, the lessons learned were applied to the follow-on Aegis Combat System and the associated AN/SPY-1 passive electronically scanned array (PESA) radar.

== History ==
SCANFAR Radars on USS Long Beach (CGN-9)

Prior to the development of SCANFAR, the Navy had been developing an advanced anti-aircraft weapon system combining an extremely advanced radar system, the AN/SPG-59, with a new long-range missile known as the RIM-50 Typhon. The radar was an active electronically scanned array that acted both as a long-range surveillance system as well as the target illumination and guidance system for the missiles. The system proved to be beyond the state of the art, in particular it required a large number of individual broadcast elements that proved to be unreliable and expensive.

SCANFAR was to some extent a simplified version of the SPG-59. The main radar would be used solely for surveillance, with target illumination being left to existing radar systems used with earlier missiles like the RIM-8 Talos or RIM-24 Tartar. During development it was found that attempting to use a single antenna for both search and tracking did not work effectively, so the system was modified to use two antennas, one for surveillance and another for tracking. Thus the system ended up using three radar antennas, and was, therefore, similar to earlier systems. An automatic tracking computer was added to the system in 1967. Also, in 1967, USS Long Beach detected and destroyed two North Vietnamese MiGs, utilizing the SCANFAR and Talos missile systems.

In service, the system proved to be temperamental, due largely to the huge number of vacuum tubes it used. Despite this, the "air picture" it provided was good, with over-the-horizon capabilities. In 1967, during a shipyard overhaul period, the Long Beach radar system was converted from electronic tubes to solid state electronic boards. Converting to solid state for radar and radio equipment lightened the superstructure by 20 tons. AN/SPS-33 was an S band radar with a pencil beam function that could focus a single radar beam on a target. The pencil beam could be manually operated. SCANFAR was eventually replaced by the AN/SPS-48E.

- AN/SPS-32 was a horizontally wide rectangular antenna for air surveillance.
- AN/SPS-33 was a vertical narrow rectangular antenna for target tracking. According to Navy documentation, the AN/SPS-33 was frequency-scanned in elevation and phase-scanned in azimuth.

== See also ==
- Joint Electronics Type Designation System – Unclassified designation system for United States military electronic equipment
- List of radars
- List of military electronics of the United States
