= Herbert W. Rhodes =

American architect

- Born: June 14, 1886; Portland, Maine
- Died: October 1956 (aged 70); Kingston, New York
- Occupation: Architect

Herbert W. Rhodes (June 14, 1886 – October 1956) was an American architect from Portland, Maine. He designed several notable buildings in his hometown, including the Chapman Building (one of Maine's first two skyscrapers), the Eastland Hotel and the State Theatre. In Manchester, New Hampshire, he designed the Hotel Carpenter.

Rhodes was born in Portland, Maine, but moved to Norwood, Massachusetts, as a child. He attended Norwood High School and worked as an architect there from 1906 to 1915. He returned to Portland, where he worked as an architect until 1942. After Portland, he relocated to Burlington, Vermont, and later to Kingston, New York.

== See also ==
- List of American Architects
