= The Westin Portland Harborview =

Historic hotel in Maine, United States

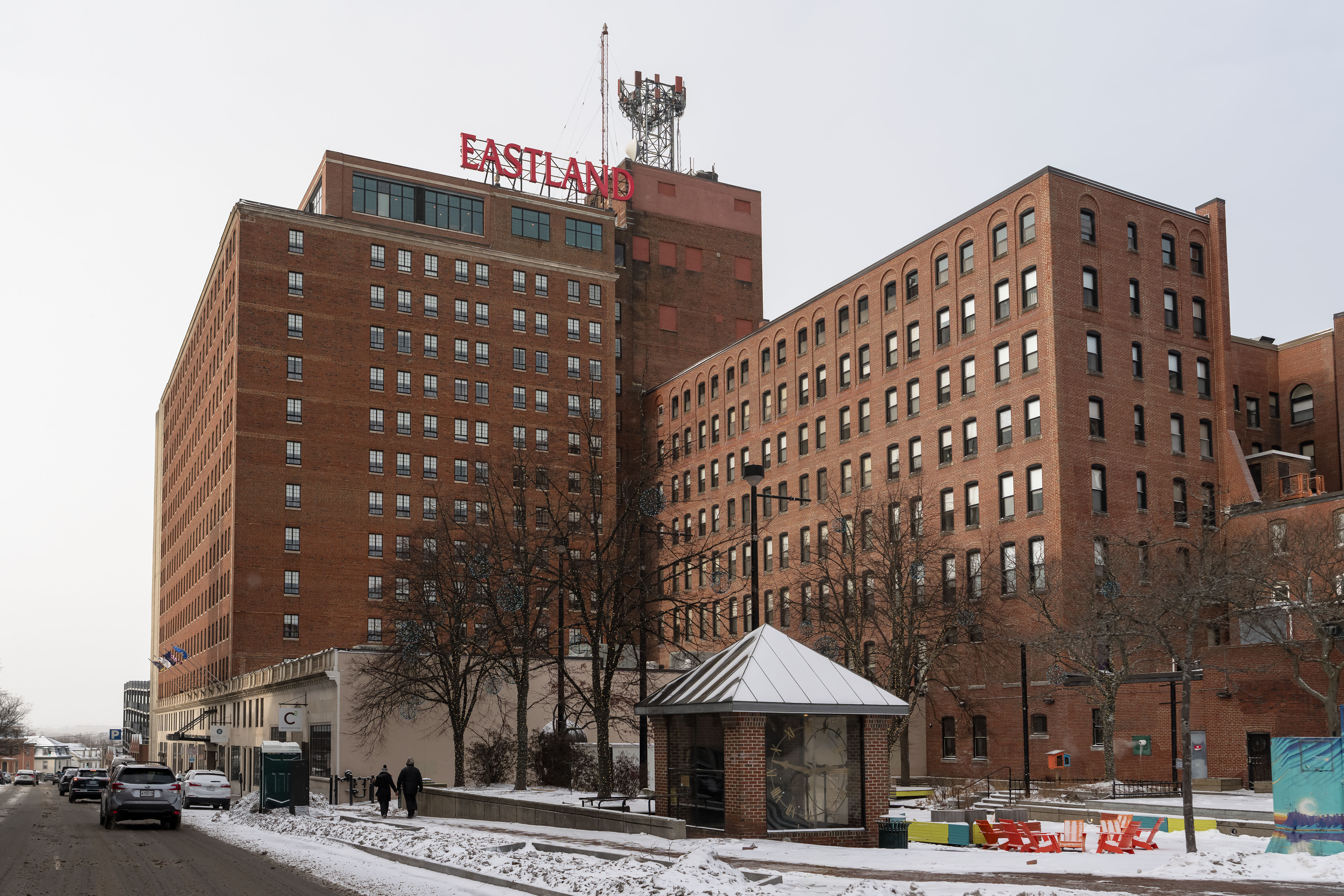
- Looking northwest from Congress Square Park in 2026
- Interactive map of the The Westin Portland Harborview area

General information
- Coordinates: 43°39′17.5″N 70°15′51″W
- Opening: June 15, 1927
- Management: Westin Hotels

Design and construction
- Architect: Herbert W. Rhodes
- Developer: Henry P. Rines

Website
- Official website

The Westin Portland Harborview is a historic hotel at 157 High Street in Portland, Maine, United States.

== History ==
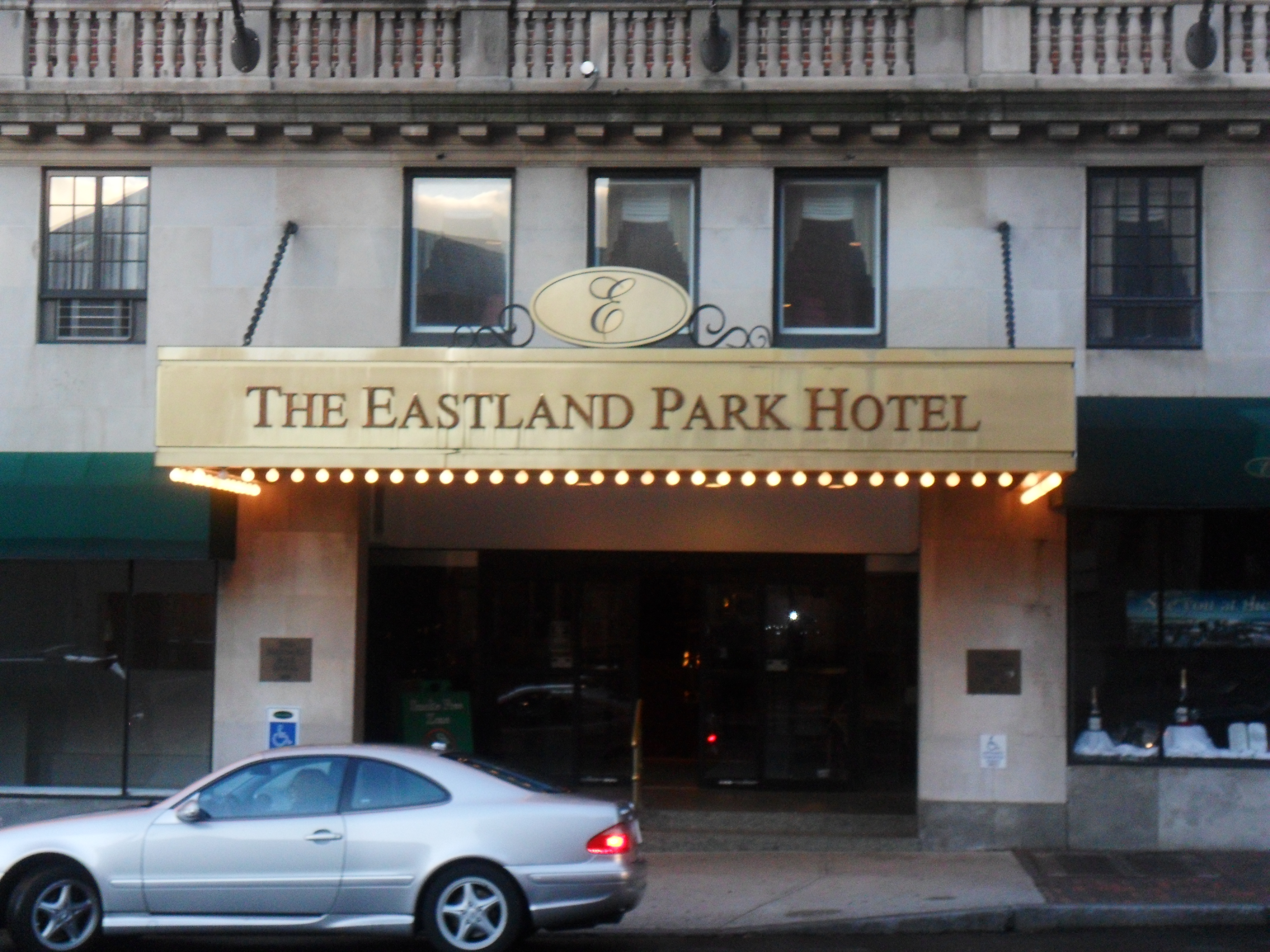
The hotel entrance when it operated as the Eastland Park Hotel, in November 2010

The hotel was developed by Henry P. Rines, a Portland hotelier. Designed by Portland architect Herbert W. Rhodes, it opened in 1927 as The Eastland, the largest hotel in New England. Aviator Charles Lindbergh stayed at The Eastland after returning from his historic solo non-stop flight across the Atlantic Ocean. In 1946, the hotel gained attention when it refused to allow former First Lady Eleanor Roosevelt to stay with her dog, Fala, for the night. She instead stayed at the Royal River Cabins in Yarmouth.

In 1961, The Eastland was bought by the Dunfey family. In 1965, they made it a Sheraton Hotels franchise operation, and it was renamed the Sheraton-Eastland Motor Hotel. The hotel left Sheraton in 1974 and became the Eastland Motor Hotel. It was sold in 1980 and renovated. While undergoing renovations, it suffered a fire in November 1981, resulting in the destruction of the hotel's ballroom, which was being used to store bedding and furniture for the renovated guest rooms. The hotel was renamed the Sonesta Portland Hotel in 1983. It left Sonesta in January 1995 and was briefly renamed the Eastland Plaza Hotel, only to become the Radisson Eastland Hotel Portland six months later, in July 1995. Following a 1997 sale of the property, the hotel left Radisson in December 1999 amid legal disputes and was renamed the Eastland Hotel. Following a foreclosure sale in 2000, its name was modified slightly to the Eastland Park Hotel. It kept that name through a 2004 renovation until it closed in 2011. The hotel was completely gutted and rebuilt as a modern business hotel and reopened as The Westin Portland Harborview on December 12, 2013.

== See also ==
- List of Historic Hotels of America
