= Chris Caiazzo =

American politician

Member of the Maine House of Representatives from the 28th district
- Incumbent
- Assumed office December 5, 2018
- Preceded by: Heather Sirocki
- Succeeded by: Irene Gifford

Member of the Scarborough Town Council
- In office 2015–2018

Personal details
- Party: Democratic
- Spouse: Beth Caiazzo
- Children: Two
- Education: Maine Maritime Academy (BASc)

Christopher James Caiazzo is an American politician. A Democrat, he represents District 28 in the Maine House of Representatives, which includes part of Scarborough, Maine.

== Political career ==
Caiazzo served as Finance Chair for the Scarborough, Maine Board of Education from 2012 to 2015, and as a member of the Scarborough Town Council from 2015 to 2018.

In 2016, Caiazzo ran for election to represent District 28 in the Maine House of Representatives, but lost to Republican incumbent Heather Sirocki. He ran again in 2018, and won against Republican Linwood Higgins. He is running for re-election in 2020.

=== Electoral record ===
2016 general election: Maine House of Representatives, District 28
Party	Candidate	Votes	%
Republican	Heather Sirocki	3,046	52.58%
Democratic	Chris Caiazzo	2,747	47.42%

2018 general election: Maine House of Representatives, District 28
Party	Candidate	Votes	%
Democratic	Chris Caiazzo	2,792	53.0%
Republican	Linwood Higgins	2,476	47.0%

== Personal life ==
Caiazzo earned a Bachelor of Applied Science in Marine Engineering at the Maine Maritime Academy, and was a Lieutenant in the United States Navy Reserve from 1994 to 2005. He and his wife, Beth, have two children.
