= Rollins Mountain =

Mountain in Maine, United States

- Location within Maine

Highest point
- Elevation: 1,000 ft (300 m) NAVD 88
- Prominence: 670 ft (200 m)
- Coordinates: 45°23′14″N 68°21′50″W

Geography
- Location: Penobscot County, Maine, U.S.

Climbing
- Easiest route: Hiking, class 1

Rollins Mountain is a mountain in Lincoln, Maine in northeastern Penobscot County. It is the site of a 60 MW wind farm that was opposed by some local residents.
