= Henry P. Rines =

American businessman

- Born: April 30, 1885; Lincoln, Maine, U.S.
- Died: March 2, 1939 (aged 53); Cape Elizabeth, Maine, U.S.
- Resting place: Evergreen Cemetery, Portland, Maine, U.S.
- Occupation: Hotelier
- Spouse: Adeline N. Bond (married 1915–1939; his death)

Henry Pritchard Rines (April 30, 1885 – March 2, 1939) was an American hotelier, active in New England, United States, during the first half of the 20th century. He owned interests in several hotels and was also a pioneer of commercial radio broadcasting.

== Early life ==
Rines was born in 1885 in Lincoln, Maine, to Joseph Henry Rines and Anna Isabel Pritchard. His father established Rines Brothers, one of the largest department stores in Portland, Maine. The family lived at 767–797 Congress Street, a building dating to 1887, designed for his parents by Francis H. Fassett. Now known as the Rines Mansion, it has been the home of the Roma Cafe since 1935.

== Career ==
In 1896, Rines was the developer involved in the construction of the Congress Square Hotel in Portland. It was located at the southern corner of Congress Street and Forest Avenue, a location previously occupied by the City Hotel. He also pioneered the commercial broadcasting of the WCSH, Portland's first radio station, from the hotel in 1925. It remained there for around fifty years. The Congress Square Hotel was adjoined by another of Rines's ventures, the Eastland Hotel, in 1927. The Rines family sold both hotels in 1964.

Rines was also involved in the Hotel Carpenter in Manchester, New Hampshire.

In 1929, Rines, in partnership with Boston architect Peter Holdensen, built Danish Village in Scarborough, Maine. It was demolished in 1976.

== Personal life ==
Rines married Adeline N. Bond in 1915. They had a son, William, and a daughter, Mary.

== Death ==
Rines died in 1939, aged 53. He was interred in Portland's Evergreen Cemetery. His widow, who continued the family enterprises, survived him by 37 years. She was buried beside him in 1976.
