= Lincoln, Maine =

Town in Maine, United States

- Town
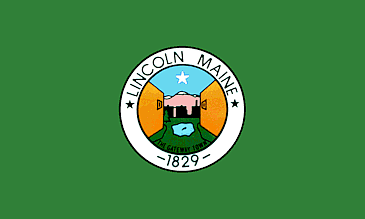
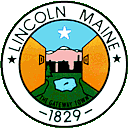
- Flag Seal Logo

- Location within Maine Location within the United States
- Coordinates: 45°21′16″N 68°27′16″W
- Country: United States
- State: Maine
- County: Penobscot

Area
  - Total: 74.65 sq mi (193.34 km^{2})
  - Land: 67.83 sq mi (175.68 km^{2})
  - Water: 6.82 sq mi (17.66 km^{2})
- Elevation: 233 ft (71 m)

Population (2020)
  - Total: 4,853
  - Density: 71/sq mi (27.6/km^{2})
- Time zone: UTC-5 (Eastern (EST))
  - Summer (DST): UTC-4 (EDT)
- ZIP code: 04457
- Area code: 207
- FIPS code: 23-39475
- GNIS feature ID: 582559
- Website: www.LincolnMaine.org

Lincoln is a town in Penobscot County, Maine, United States. The town's population was 4,853 at the 2020 United States Census. It contains the census-designated place of the same name. A statue honoring Medal of Honor recipient Gary Gordon was installed in Lincoln, in 2021. The 10-foot (3.0 m) bronze sculpture faces Gordon's grave at Park Street Cemetery.

== Etymology ==
Lincoln is named after Maine's sixth governor, Enoch Lincoln. The original name of the settlement was "Mattanawcook" preceding a name change by the Maine state legislature in 1829; it survives in the name of the town high school, Mattanawcook Academy.

== Geography ==
Lincoln developed around a water powered sawmill on the east bank of the Penobscot River. According to the United States Census Bureau, the town has a total area of 74.65 square miles (193.34 km^{2}), of which 67.83 square miles (175.68 km^{2}) is land and 6.82 square miles (17.66 km^{2}) is water. Rollins Mountain is located in Lincoln. The town has 13 different ponds.

== Climate ==
According to the Köppen Climate Classification system, Lincoln has a warm-summer humid continental climate, abbreviated "Dfb" on climate maps. The hottest temperature recorded in Lincoln was 96 °F (35.6 °C) on August 15, 2002 and September 9, 2002, while the coldest temperature recorded was −33 °F (−36.1 °C) on January 27–28, 2022.

Climate data for Lincoln, Maine, 1991–2020 normals, extremes 2001–present
Month	Jan	Feb	Mar	Apr	May	Jun	Jul	Aug	Sep	Oct	Nov	Dec	Year
Record high °F (°C)	55 (13)	58 (14)	82 (28)	89 (32)	94 (34)	95 (35)	94 (34)	96 (36)	96 (36)	81 (27)	74 (23)	62 (17)	96 (36)
Mean maximum °F (°C)	48.5 (9.2)	46.4 (8.0)	55.2 (12.9)	73.9 (23.3)	86.4 (30.2)	88.5 (31.4)	90.1 (32.3)	88.1 (31.2)	83.5 (28.6)	73.3 (22.9)	62.7 (17.1)	51.3 (10.7)	92.2 (33.4)
Mean daily maximum °F (°C)	25.6 (−3.6)	29.1 (−1.6)	38.2 (3.4)	51.7 (10.9)	65.5 (18.6)	74.0 (23.3)	79.3 (26.3)	77.7 (25.4)	69.5 (20.8)	56.5 (13.6)	43.5 (6.4)	31.5 (−0.3)	53.5 (11.9)
Daily mean °F (°C)	14.5 (−9.7)	16.9 (−8.4)	27.6 (−2.4)	41.0 (5.0)	54.3 (12.4)	63.2 (17.3)	69.0 (20.6)	67.1 (19.5)	58.5 (14.7)	46.6 (8.1)	35.4 (1.9)	23.1 (−4.9)	43.1 (6.2)
Mean daily minimum °F (°C)	3.4 (−15.9)	4.8 (−15.1)	17.0 (−8.3)	30.4 (−0.9)	43.0 (6.1)	52.5 (11.4)	58.8 (14.9)	56.5 (13.6)	47.6 (8.7)	36.7 (2.6)	27.2 (−2.7)	14.8 (−9.6)	32.7 (0.4)
Mean minimum °F (°C)	−17.4 (−27.4)	−14.7 (−25.9)	−4.1 (−20.1)	17.7 (−7.9)	30.9 (−0.6)	41.1 (5.1)	49.3 (9.6)	46.0 (7.8)	34.5 (1.4)	26.1 (−3.3)	12.6 (−10.8)	−6.5 (−21.4)	−21.2 (−29.6)
Record low °F (°C)	−33 (−36)	−29 (−34)	−20 (−29)	3 (−16)	26 (−3)	33 (1)	46 (8)	42 (6)	29 (−2)	18 (−8)	4 (−16)	−29 (−34)	−33 (−36)
Average precipitation inches (mm)	3.46 (88)	2.38 (60)	3.52 (89)	3.58 (91)	3.72 (94)	4.07 (103)	3.37 (86)	3.61 (92)	3.43 (87)	4.73 (120)	4.17 (106)	4.23 (107)	44.27 (1,123)
Average precipitation days (≥ 0.01 in)	10.0	9.3	10.3	10.9	12.6	12.9	11.8	11.2	9.1	11.6	11.3	12.4	133.4
Source 1: NOAA
Source 2: National Weather Service (mean maxima/minima 2006–2020)

== Demographics ==
Historical population
Census	Pop.	Note	%±
1810	224		—
1830	404		—
1840	1,121		177.5%
1850	1,356		21.0%
1860	1,631		20.3%
1870	1,530		−6.2%
1880	1,659		8.4%
1890	1,756		5.8%
1900	1,731		−1.4%
1910	1,988		14.8%
1920	2,452		23.3%
1930	2,970		21.1%
1940	3,653		23.0%
1950	4,030		10.3%
1960	4,541		12.7%
1970	4,759		4.8%
1980	5,066		6.5%
1990	5,587		10.3%
2000	5,221		−6.6%
2010	5,085		−2.6%
2020	4,853		−4.6%
U.S. Decennial Census

=== 2010 ===
As of the census of 2010, there were 5,085 people, 2,045 households, and 1,415 families living in the town. The population density was 75.0 inhabitants per square mile (29.0/km^{2}). There were 2,866 housing units at an average density of 42.3 per square mile (16.3/km^{2}). The ethnic makeup of the town was 97.1% White, 0.3% African American, 0.6% Native American, 0.4% Asian, 0.1% from other races, and 1.5% from two or more races. Hispanic or Latino of any race were 1.0% of the population.

There were 2,045 households, of which 31.9% had children under the age of 18 living with them, 53.3% were married couples living together, 10.8% had a female householder with no husband present, 5.1% had a male householder with no wife present, and 30.8% were non-families. 24.4% of all households were made up of individuals, and 11% had someone living alone who was 65 years of age or older. The average household size was 2.44 and the average family size was 2.87.

The median age in the town was 42.3 years. 23.1% of residents were under the age of 18; 7.9% were between the ages of 18 and 24; 22.7% were from 25 to 44; 29.2% were from 45 to 64; and 17.2% were 65 years of age or older. The gender makeup of the town was 48.9% male and 51.1% female.

=== 2000 ===
As of the census of 2000, there were 5,221 people, 2,108 households, and 1,475 families living in the town. The population density was 76.9 inhabitants per square mile (29.7/km^{2}). There were 2,661 housing units at an average density of 39.2 per square mile (15.1/km^{2}). The ethnic makeup of the town was 98.35% White, 0.10% or African American, 0.36% Native American, 0.40% Asian, 0.08% from other races, and 0.71% from two or more races. Hispanic of any race were 0.36% of the population.

There were 2,108 households, out of which 31.5% had children under the age of 18 living with them, 57.2% were married couples living together, 9.7% had a female householder with no husband present, and 30.0% were non-families. 24.2% of all households were made up of individuals, and 12.8% had someone living alone who was 65 years of age or older. The average household size was 2.44 and the average family size was 2.87.

In the town, the population was spread out, with 24.3% under the age of 18, 7.3% from 18 to 24, 26.3% from 25 to 44, 24.9% from 45 to 64, and 17.3% who were 65 years of age or older. The median age was 40 years. For every 100 females, there were 91.9 males. For every 100 females age 18 and over, there were 89.0 males.

The median income for a household in the town was $30,823, and the median income for a family was $35,295. Males had a median income of $33,179 versus $21,286 for females. The per capita income for the town was $14,730. About 13.6% of families and 17.0% of the population were below the poverty line, including 28.1% of those under age 18 and 4.4% of those age 65 or over.

== Media ==
The Lincoln News established in 1959, is designed, produced, and printed in Lincoln and serves as its local newspaper. Lincoln's former radio stations WLKN and WHMX went off-air in July 1995.

== Notable people ==
- Irene Gifford, member of the Maine House of Representatives
- Jeffery Gifford, member of the Maine House of Representatives (2006–2022)
- Terry Gilpatrick, Miss Maine (1977)
- Gary Gordon, Medal of Honor recipient, killed in action (1993)
- Samuel F. Hersey, U.S. congressman, "lumber baron", philanthropist
- Ernest Holmes (1887–1960), founder of the Religious Science movement
- Russell Libby (1956–2012), agriculturist, poet, executive director of MOFGA (1995–2012)
- Henry P. Rines (1885–1939), hotelier
