= MV Charles L. Gilliland =

Cargo ship of the United States Navy

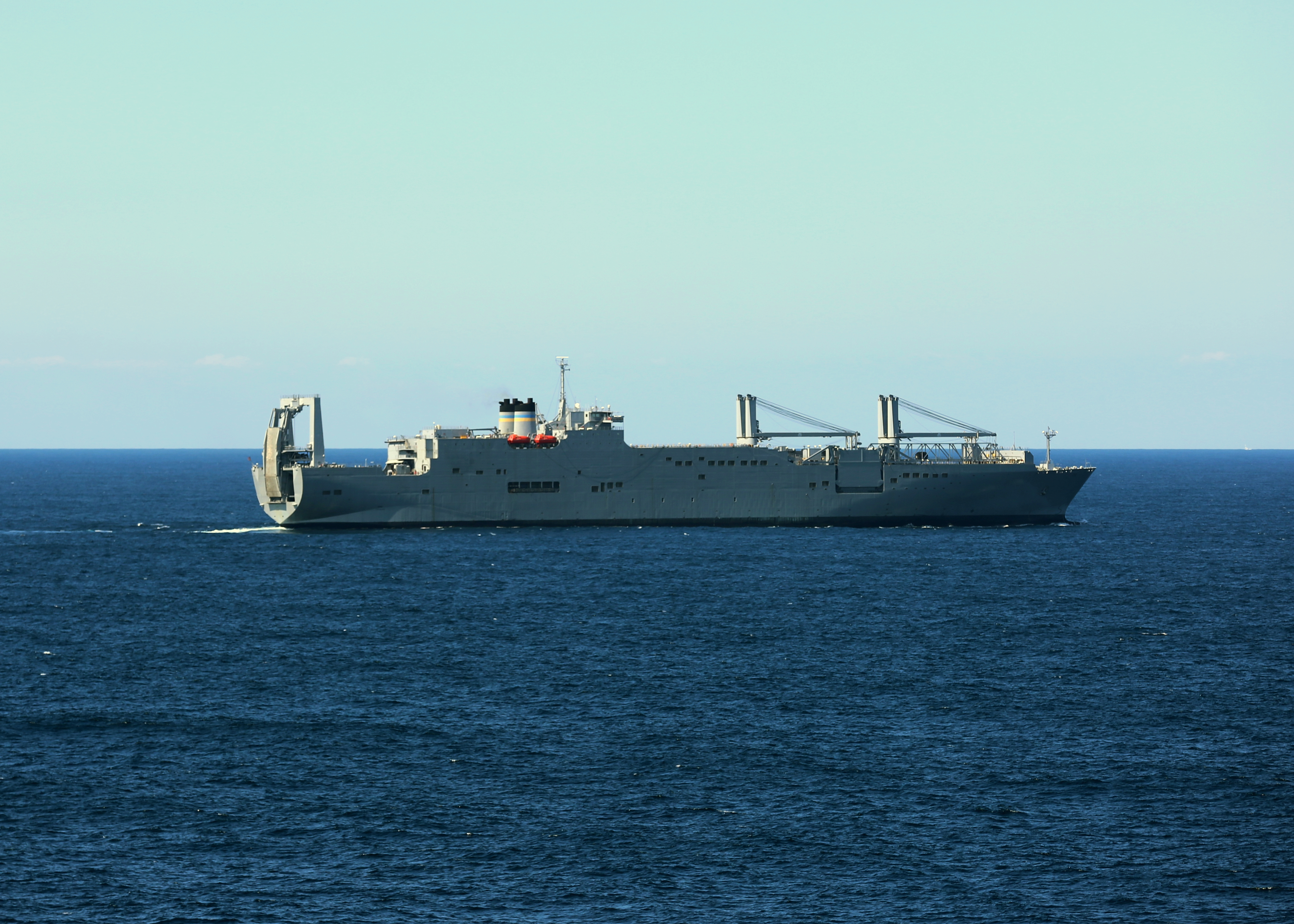

History

United States
- Name: USNS Gilliland
- Namesake: Charles L. Gilliland
- Operator: Military Sealift Command
- Builder: Burmeister & Wain Shipyard Denmark
- Launched: 21 April 1972
- In service: 23 May 1997
- Renamed: Built as MV Selandia in 1972 and lengthened by Hyundai in 1984
- Stricken: 17 May 2023
- Identification: IMO number: 7227205; MMSI number: 367832000; Callsign: NAMJ
- Status: Stricken, in Ready Reserve Force

General characteristics
- Class & type: Gordon-class roll on roll off vehicle cargo ship
- Displacement: 32,589 t.(lt) 65,000 t.(fl)
- Length: 954 ft (291 m)
- Beam: 105 ft 9 in (32.23 m)
- Draft: 36 ft (11 m)
- Propulsion: 1 × Burmeister & Wain 12K84EF diesel; 26,000 hp(m) (19.11 MW); 2 × Burmeister & Wain 9K84EF diesels, 39,000 hp(m) (28.66 MW); 3 shafts (center cp prop) bow thruster
- Speed: 24 knots (44 km/h)
- Capacity: 284,064 sq ft (26,390.4 m^{2}); 49,991 sq ft (4,644.3 m^{2}) deck cargo
- Complement: 12 reduced / up to 45 full, civilian mariners; 50 US Navy personnel

MV Charles L. Gilliland, formerly USNS Gilliland (T-AKR-298), is a Gordon-class Large, Medium-Speed Roll-on/Roll-off vehicle cargo ship of the United States Navy. She was originally built as a merchant vessel but later acquired and converted by the Navy, and assigned to the United States Department of Defense's Military Sealift Command. Gilliland was built in 1972 as MV Selandia. After some time spent in commercial service she was lengthened by Hyundai Heavy Industries in 1984, and later went on to be acquired by the US Navy under a long-term charter. She was converted to a US Navy Vehicle Roll-on/Roll-off Ship at Newport News Shipbuilding and Drydock Company in Newport News, Virginia, in a contract dated 23 May 1997 and on completion was assigned to the Military Sealift Command under the name USNS Gilliland, after Medal of Honor recipient Corporal Charles L. Gilliland. Gilliland is one of 28 Strategic Sealift Ships operated by the Military Sealift Command. She was assigned to the MSC Atlantic surge force, and is maintained in Ready Operational Status 4.

In June 1996, a sudden windstorm caused Gilliland to break free from her mooring at Newport News, cross the harbor, and collide with the submarine USS Tucson (SSN-770) at her moorings and the destroyer USS Deyo (DD-989), which was moored behind Tucson. While Deyo suffered the most damage, Tucson suffered only minor damage.

On 17 May 2023, Gilliland was stricken from the Naval Vessel Register. The same day, Gilliland was transferred to the United States Maritime Administration (MARAD) Ready Reserve Force (RRF) and renamed Charles L. Gilliland also losing the USNS designation. If activated, Charles L. Gilliland will report to the Military Sealift Command for operational control. Charles L. Gilliland is maintained in a reduced operating status and the crew is provided by commercial companies under contract to MARAD.

As of 31 January 2024, Charles L. Gilliland was assigned to Baltimore harbor.

The vessel caught fire while moored on July 13, 2026.
