= Charles L. Gilliland =

US Army soldier and Medal of Honor recipient

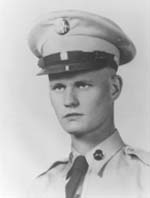
- Gilliland in c. 1951
- Born: May 24, 1933 near Mountain Home, Arkansas
- Died: April 25, 1951 (aged 17) near Tongmang-ni, Korea
- Military career
- Allegiance: United States
- Branch: United States Army
- Service years: 1950–1951
- Rank: Corporal (posthumous)
- Units: 7th Infantry Regiment, 3rd Infantry Division
- Conflicts: Korean War (MIA)
- Awards: Medal of Honor; Purple Heart

Charles Leon Gilliland (May 24, 1933 – April 25, 1951) was a United States Army soldier who was posthumously awarded the United States military's highest award, the Medal of Honor, for his actions in the Korean War. Gilliland, at age 17, was the youngest Medal of Honor recipient of the Korean War.

== Early life ==
Born in the community of Colfax near Mountain Home, Arkansas, Gilliland was the second of nine children of Leon Carl Gilliland, a farmer and construction worker, and Evangeline Margarite Martin Gilliland, a nurse's aide. The Gillilands moved to nearby Marion County when Charles was a teenager. Throughout his childhood, Gilliland showed a strong interest in the military and law enforcement, enjoyed hunting and fishing, and was a fitness enthusiast in his teenage years. When Gilliland was 16, he attempted to enlist in the Marine Corps, but was turned away and advised to continue his education. After much convincing, Gilliland's parents agreed to let him enlist in the U.S. Army on his 17th birthday, May 24, 1950.

== Military career ==
After joining the United States Army in Yellville, Gilliland attended basic training at Fort Riley, Kansas. The Korean War began one month after his enlistment, and by the end of the year, Gilliland had been sent to east Asia. During his deployment in Korea, Gilliland was wounded and, in one instance, carried to safety a fellow soldier who had lost both his legs.

By April 25, 1951, Gilliland was a private first class serving with Company I of the 7th Infantry Regiment, 3rd Infantry Division. On that day, near Tongmang-ni, his company came under attack from a numerically superior Chinese force. From his defensive position, Gilliland had a clear view of the defile through which many of the attackers were approaching. Using his automatic rifle, Gilliland fired continuously into the defile, even after suffering a severe head wound while chasing down two Chinese soldiers who had breached the defensive line. When orders came to pull back, he voluntarily stayed behind and provided covering fire so that the rest of his unit could withdraw. Gilliland was never seen again.

Gilliland was posthumously promoted to corporal, and in 1952, recommended for the Medal of Honor. Believing that Gilliland may have been captured by the Chinese, the Army delayed the announcement of the award for fear that he would be punished if his captors learned of his deeds. In 1954, after hostilities had ceased and no sign of Gilliland was found, he was declared dead. The Medal of Honor was formally presented to his family in December of that year during a ceremony at the Pentagon. One month shy of his 18th birthday when he earned the award, Gilliland was the youngest Medal of Honor recipient of the Korean War.

On what would have been his 64th birthday, May 24, 1997, the U.S. Navy christened a transport ship in Gilliland's honor, the USNS Gilliland.

== Medal of Honor citation ==
Gilliland's official citation reads:

Cpl. Gilliland, a member of Company I, distinguished himself by conspicuous gallantry and outstanding courage above and beyond the call of duty in action against the enemy. A numerically superior hostile force launched a coordinated assault against his company perimeter, the brunt of which was directed up a defile covered by his automatic rifle. His assistant was killed by enemy fire but Cpl. Gilliland, facing the full force of the assault, poured a steady fire into the foe which stemmed the onslaught. When 2 enemy soldiers escaped his raking fire and infiltrated the sector, he leaped from his foxhole, overtook and killed them both with his pistol. Sustaining a serious head wound in this daring exploit, he refused medical attention and returned to his emplacement to continue his defense of the vital defile. His unit was ordered back to new defensive positions but Cpl. Gilliland volunteered to remain to cover the withdrawal and hold the enemy at bay. His heroic actions and indomitable devotion to duty prevented the enemy from completely overrunning his company positions. Cpl. Gilliland's incredible valor and supreme sacrifice reflect lasting glory upon himself and are in keeping with the honored traditions of the military service.

== Awards and decorations ==

Badge	Combat Infantryman Badge		
1st row	Medal of Honor		
2nd row	Purple Heart	Army of Occupation Medal with 'Japan' clasp	National Defense Service Medal
3rd row	Korean Service Medal with 1 Campaign star	United Nations Service Medal Korea	Korean War Service Medal
Unit awards	Korean Presidential Unit Citation		

== See also ==
- List of Korean War Medal of Honor recipients
