= Lincoln (CDP), Maine =

Lincoln, Maine
- Census-designated place
- Location within Maine Location within the United States
- Coordinates: 45°21′58″N 68°29′45″W
- Country: United States
- State: Maine
- County: Penobscot

Area
  - Total: 8.20 sq mi (21.24 km^{2})
  - Land: 7.42 sq mi (19.23 km^{2})
  - Water: 0.78 sq mi (2.01 km^{2})
- Elevation: 213 ft (65 m)

Population (2020)
  - Total: 2,667
  - Density: 359.2/sq mi (138.67/km^{2})
- Time zone: UTC-5 (Eastern (EST))
  - Summer (DST): UTC-4 (EDT)
- ZIP code: 04457
- Area code: 207
- FIPS code: 23-39440
- GNIS feature ID: 2377926

Lincoln is a census-designated place (CDP) consisting of the primary settlement in the town of Lincoln in Penobscot County, Maine, United States. The population was 2,884 at the 2010 census.

== Geography ==
According to the United States Census Bureau, the CDP has a total area of 8.2 square miles (21.2 km^{2}), of which 7.4 square miles (19.2 km^{2}) is land and 0.77 square miles (2.0 km^{2}), or 9.45%, is water.

== Demographics ==
Historical population
Census	Pop.	Note	%±
2020	2,667		—
U.S. Decennial Census

As of the census of 2000, there were 2,933 people, 1,229 households, and 802 families residing in the CDP. The population density was 397.8 inhabitants per square mile (153.6/km^{2}). There were 1,350 housing units at an average density of 183.1 per square mile (70.7/km^{2}). The racial makeup of the CDP was 98.30% White, 0.14% Black or African American, 0.41% Native American, 0.51% Asian, and 0.65% from two or more races. Hispanic or Latino of any race were 0.24% of the population.

There were 1,229 households, out of which 29.6% had children under the age of 18 living with them, 51.0% were married couples living together, 11.3% had a female householder with no husband present, and 34.7% were non-families. 29.0% of all households were made up of individuals, and 16.6% had someone living alone who was 65 years of age or older. The average household size was 2.32 and the average family size was 2.85.

In the CDP, the population was spread out, with 23.1% under the age of 18, 7.9% from 18 to 24, 25.3% from 25 to 44, 22.6% from 45 to 64, and 21.2% who were 65 years of age or older. The median age was 41 years. For every 100 females, there were 86.1 males. For every 100 females age 18 and over, there were 82.2 males.

The median income for a household in the CDP was $25,728, and the median income for a family was $32,333. Males had a median income of $36,167 versus $28,967 for females. The per capita income for the CDP was $13,443. About 17.7% of families and 19.8% of the population were below the poverty line, including 42.9% of those under age 18 and 2.5% of those age 65 or over.

== Notable person ==
- Medal of Honor recipient Master Sergeant Gary Gordon, who was killed in action at the Battle of Mogadishu in 1993.
