= Mattanawcook Academy =

Location
- 33 Reed Drive; Lincoln, Maine 04457; United States
- Coordinates: 45°22′43″N 68°29′47″W

Information
- School district: RSU No. 67
- Superintendent: Keith S. Laser
- Principal: Matthew Arsenault
- Colors: Maroon and gray
- Mascot: Lynx
- Website: www.rsu67.org

Mattanawcook Academy is a public high school located in Lincoln, Maine, United States.

The Maine Department of Education assigns schools to unorganized areas. Molunkus (TA R5 WELS) is assigned to this school.

== History ==
It was founded in 1847 as Lincoln High School. The name was changed to Mattanawcook Academy in 1850. On July 1, 1968, the towns of Chester, Burlington, Lowell, Lincoln, Mattawamkeag, and Macwahoc joined for mutual benefit and formed Regional School Unit No. 67 which now comprises Mattanawcook Academy, Mattanawcook Junior High School, and Ella P. Burr Elementary School.

== School mascot and colors ==
The Mattanawcook Academy mascot is the lynx. The school colors are maroon and gray.
