= Fag bomb =

Photograph of a bomb with homophobic graffiti

The "fag bomb" aboard the USS Enterprise

The "fag bomb" was a U.S. military fighter-mounted bomb (a GBU-31 JDAM), photographed aboard the aircraft carrier USS Enterprise in October 2001 during the United States' invasion of Afghanistan while in the Arabian Sea.

== History ==
On October 11, while being readied to an F-18 Hornet for deployment in an air mission above Afghanistan, the bomb was defaced with a graffiti (a "message" to the bomb's targets) by an unidentified U.S. Navy sailor with the message "HIGH JACK THIS FAGS." The term HIGH JACK referred to the September 11 attacks one month prior, which utilized hijacked passenger airlines. The September 11 attacks led to the military action against Afghanistan.

The photograph sparked outrage from the LGBT community, and the Associated Press pulled it from wires the following day after pressure from the Gay & Lesbian Alliance Against Defamation (GLAAD) and the Human Rights Campaign. The Washington Post questioned why the term fags was used as an insult when several victims in the hijacked planes were themselves gay, including Mark Bingham, who was believed to have confronted the hijackers on United Airlines Flight 93.

Both the Associated Press and the United States Navy have apologized for the incident. AP spokesman Jack Stokes described publishing the photograph as a "journalistic error," saying that the "fag bomb" picture "never should have gotten through, and nobody should have seen it." XY noted that in theory all naval war photos are vetted by command so the image should not have been cleared. The gay servicemen's organization Servicemembers Legal Defense Network, now merged into the OutServe-SLDN organization, questioned how it ever could have been cleared. The Navy has said that at the time there are no regulations on what could be written on bombs. U.S. Navy rear admiral Stephen Pietropaoli promised that the crew had been admonished over their "spontaneous acts of penmanship", calling the slur "not up to our standards."

== See also ==
- Societal attitudes towards homosexuality
- Sexual orientation in the United States military
