= USS Enterprise (CVN-65) =

United States Navy aircraft carrier

Coordinates: 36.9805°N 76.4384°W

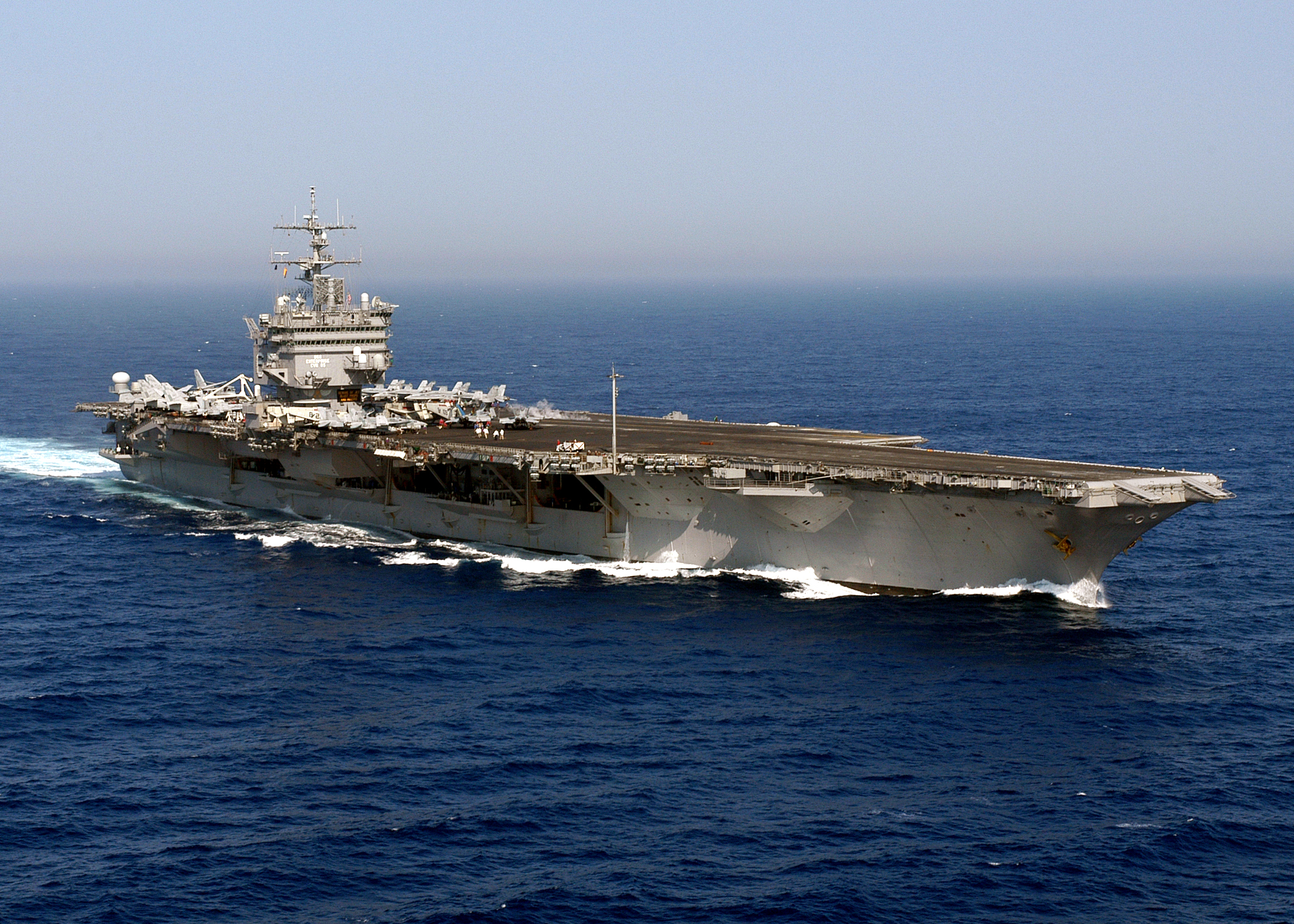
- USS Enterprise underway in the Atlantic Ocean

Class overview
- Name: Enterprise-class aircraft carrier
- Builders: Newport News Shipbuilding
- Operators: United States Navy
- Preceded by: Kitty Hawk class
- Succeeded by: Nimitz class
- Built: 1958–1961
- In service: 1961–2012 (active); 2012–2017 (inactive)
- Planned: 6
- Completed: 1
- Cancelled: 5
- Retired: 1

History

United States
- Name: Enterprise
- Namesake: USS Enterprise (CV-6)
- Ordered: 15 November 1957
- Builder: Newport News Shipbuilding and Drydock Company
- Cost: $451.3 million
- Laid down: 4 February 1958
- Launched: 24 September 1960
- Christened: 24 September 1960
- Acquired: 29 October 1961
- Commissioned: 25 November 1961
- Decommissioned: 3 February 2017
- In service: 12 January 1962
- Out of service: 1 December 2012
- Reclassified: CVN-65 from CVA(N)-65, 30 June 1975
- Refit: 27 September 1994
- Stricken: 3 February 2017
- Motto: We are Legend; Ready on Arrival; The First, the Finest; Eight Reactors, None Faster
- Nickname(s): Big E
- Status: Arrived in Mobile for dismantling and recycling
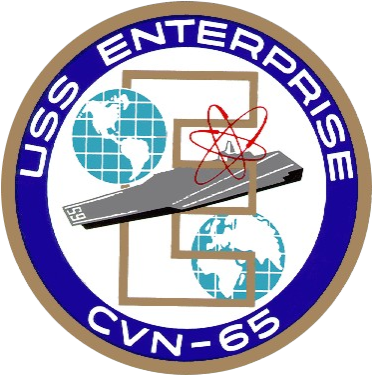
- Badge

General characteristics
- Class & type: Enterprise-class aircraft carrier
- Displacement: 93,284-long-ton (94,781 t) full load
- Length: 1,123 ft (342 m) (after refit); 1,088 ft (332 m) (original)
- Beam: 132.8 ft (40.5 m) (waterline); 257.2 ft (78.4 m) (extreme)
- Draft: 39 ft (12 m)
- Propulsion: 8 × Westinghouse A2W nuclear reactors; 4 x Westinghouse geared steam turbines; 4 × shafts; 280,000 shp (210 MW)
- Speed: 33.6 kn (38.7 mph; 62.2 km/h)
- Range: Unlimited distance; 20–25 years
- Complement: 5,828 (maximum); Ship's company: 3,000 (2,700 Sailors, 150 Chiefs, 150 Officers); Air wing: 1,800 (250 pilots, and 1,550 support personnel)
- Sensors & processing systems: AN/SPS-48 3D air search radar; AN/SPS-49 2D air search radar; MK-23 Target Acquisition System Fire Control Radar
- Electronic warfare & decoys: AN/SLQ-32 Electronic Warfare Suite; Mark 36 SRBOC
- Armament: 3 × NATO Sea Sparrow launchers (24 missiles); 3 × 20 mm Phalanx CIWS mounts; 2 RAM launchers (22 missiles)
- Armor: 8 in (20 cm) aluminum belt (equivalent to 4 in (10 cm) rolled homogeneous steel armor), armored flight deck, hangar, magazines, and reactor
- Aircraft carried: Hold up to 90; 60+ (normally)
- Aviation facilities: Flight deck: 1,123 ft (342 m)
- Notes: Equipped with 4 steam-powered catapults.

USS Enterprise (CVN-65), formerly CVA(N)-65, is a decommissioned United States Navy aircraft carrier. In 1958, she became the first nuclear-powered aircraft carrier in the United States Navy, and the world, as well as the eighth United States naval vessel to bear the name. Like her predecessor (the USS Enterprise CV-6) of World War II fame, she is nicknamed "Big E". At 1,123 feet (342 m), she is the longest naval vessel ever built and the only ship of her class, which was originally planned to have five other ships. Her 93,284-long-ton (94,781 t) displacement ranks her class as the third-largest carrier class, after the Nimitz class and the Gerald R. Ford class. Enterprise had a crew of some 4,600 service members.

Enterprise was, at the time of inactivation, the third-oldest commissioned vessel in the United States Navy after the wooden-hulled USS Constitution and USS Pueblo (AGER-2). She was inactivated at Naval Station Norfolk on 1 December 2012, and decommissioned on 3 February 2017, after over 55 years of service. She was stricken from the Naval Vessel Register the same day. The name has been adopted by the future Gerald R. Ford-class aircraft carrier USS Enterprise (CVN-80).

== Design ==
Designed under project SCB 160, USS Enterprise was intended as the lead ship of a new class of six nuclear-powered aircraft carriers, but massive increases in construction costs led to the remaining vessels being cancelled.

Enterprise is the only aircraft carrier to house more than two nuclear reactors, having an eight-reactor propulsion design, with each A2W reactor taking the place of one of the conventional boilers in earlier constructions. She is the only carrier with four rudders, two more than other classes, and features a more cruiser-like hull.

Originally intended to make use of the new C-14 Internal Combustion Catapult Powerplant developed by Reaction Motors, the ship was converted to use C-13 steam catapults shortly after launch at the behest of Admiral Rickover, who saw the new catapults as an unnecessary risk and expense given the ship's already extreme cost.

=== Armament ===
Because of the huge cost of her construction, Enterprise was launched and commissioned without the planned RIM-2 Terrier missile launchers. Initially, the carrier had little defensive armament. (Note: Four 20 mm cannon were carried according to Friedman, while two 3-inch saluting guns were carried according to Cracknell.) Late in 1967, Enterprise was fitted with a prototype Basic Point Defense Missile System (BPDMS) installation, with two eight-round box launchers for Sea Sparrow missiles. A third BPDMS launcher was fitted during the ship's refit in 1970–1971.

Later upgrades added two NATO Sea Sparrow (NSSM) and three Mk 15 Phalanx CIWS gun mounts. One CIWS mount was later removed and two 21-cell RIM-116 Rolling Airframe Missile launchers were added.

=== Radar ===
Enterprise had a phased-array radar system known as SCANFAR, which was intended to be better at tracking multiple airborne targets than conventional rotating antenna radars. SCANFAR consisted of two radars, the AN/SPS-32 and the AN/SPS-33. The AN/SPS-32 was a long-range air search and target-acquisition radar developed by Hughes for the US Navy. The AN/SPS-32 operated together with the AN/SPS-33, which was the square array used for three-dimensional tracking, into one system. It was installed on only two vessels, Enterprise and the cruiser USS Long Beach, placing an unacceptable power drain on the electrical systems of both ships.

The technology of the AN/SPS-32 was based on vacuum tubes, and the system required constant repairs. The SPS-32 was a phased-array radar, which had a range of 400 nautical miles against large targets, and 200 nautical miles against small, fighter-sized targets. These early phased arrays, replaced around 1980, were responsible for the distinctive square-looking island.

The AN/SPS-32 and AN/SPS-33 radars, while ahead of their time, suffered from issues relating to the electrical beam steering mechanism and were not pursued in further ship classes. While they are considered to be an early form of "phased-array" radar, the later technology of the Aegis phased-array AN/SPY-1 with its electronically controlled beam steering was needed to make phased array radars both reliable and practical for the USN. The dome above the SCANFAR contained the unique electronic warfare suite, the Andrew Alford AA-8200 dipole antennae (which never acquired a military designation). The system consisted of six rows of antennae encircling the dome. The antennae in the upper two rows were encased in piping radomes, as they were small and fragile.

The SCANFAR radar system was removed and replaced with AN/SPS-48 & AN/SPS-49 3D/2D air search radars during the 1979–82 major refit.

== History ==
=== Commissioning and trials ===
The ship's keel was laid at Newport News Shipbuilding and Drydock Company in Shipway 11 on 4 February 1958. On 24 September 1960, the ship was launched, sponsored by the wife of William B. Franke, then Secretary of the Navy. On 25 November 1961, Enterprise was officially commissioned, with Captain Vincent P. de Poix, formerly of Fighting Squadron 6 on her predecessor, in command. On 12 January 1962, the ship made her maiden voyage starting an extensive shakedown cruise and a lengthy series of tests and training exercises designed to determine the full capabilities of the nuclear powered super carrier. A full-speed run with her escort, USS Laffey, demonstrated the sheer power and speed of Enterprise's novel nuclear propulsion plant; afterwards, Laffey radioed, "You win the race. Fuel gone, topside salted, crew wet, and engines tired." On 20 February 1962, Enterprise was a tracking and measuring station for the flight of Friendship 7, the Project Mercury space capsule in which Lieutenant Colonel John H. Glenn Jr. made the first American orbital spaceflight. Enterprise completed shakedown activities at Naval Station Norfolk on 5 April 1962.

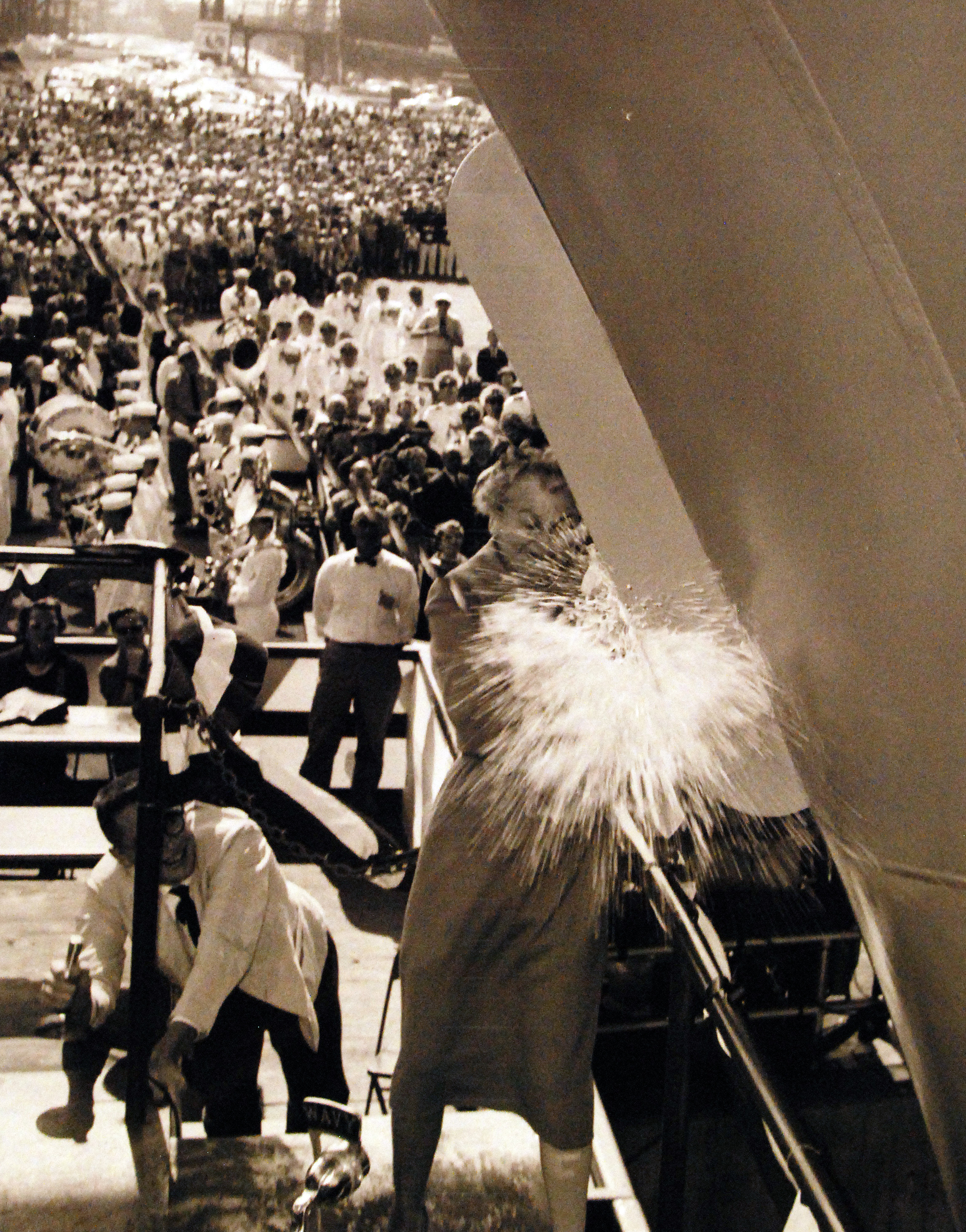
Christening at Newport News shipyard in 1960

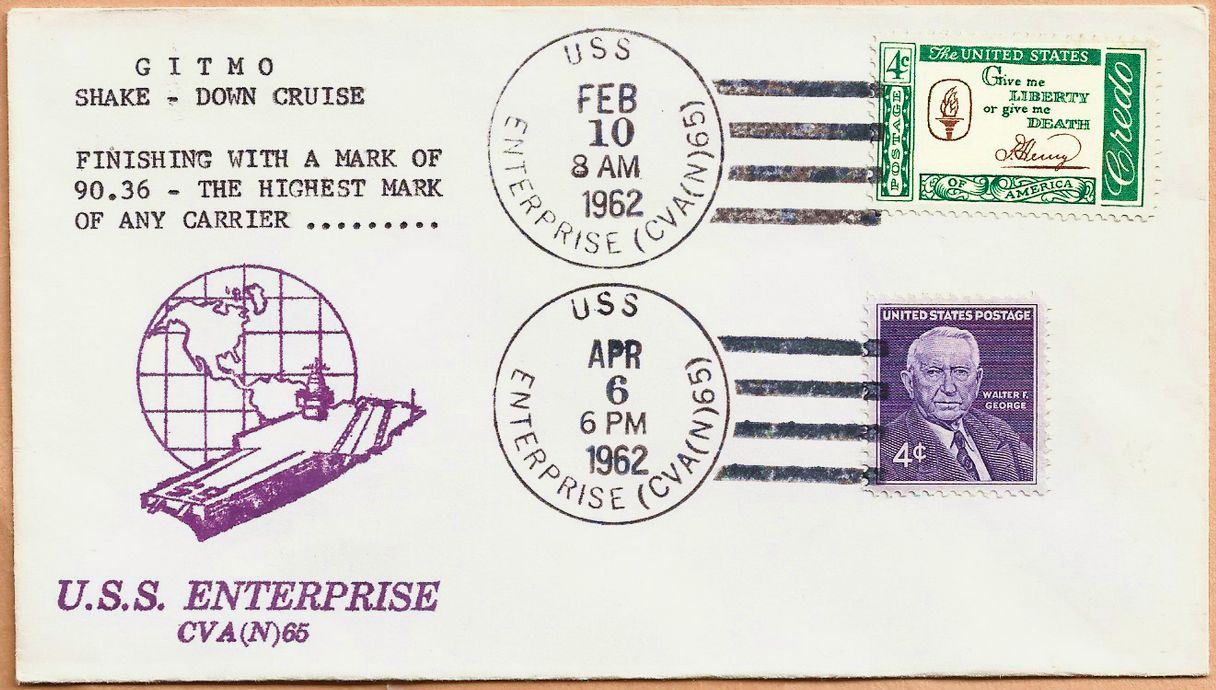
USS Enterprise, official postmark and cachet mailed during Guantanamo (GITMO) Shake Down Cruise 10 February 1962

=== 1960s ===
On 25 June 1962, Enterprise joined the 2nd Fleet on her initial operational deployment, carrying out training off the US East Coast, and took part in Exercise LantFlex 2-62, a nuclear strike exercise, in conjunction with the carrier Forrestal from 6–12 July. In August, the carrier joined the 6th Fleet in the Mediterranean Sea, returning to Norfolk, Virginia, on 11 October 1962.

==== 1962 Cuban Missile Crisis ====
In October 1962, Enterprise was dispatched to her first international crisis. Following revelations that the Soviet Union was constructing nuclear missile launch sites on Cuba, President John F. Kennedy ordered the United States Department of Defense to conduct a large-scale buildup. Among the preparations, the US Atlantic Fleet readied large numbers of its ships. On 22 October, President Kennedy ordered a naval and air "quarantine" (blockade) on shipment of offensive military equipment to Cuba and demanded the Soviets dismantle the missile sites there. Five Second Fleet carriers participated in the blockade—Enterprise (as part of Task Force 135), Independence, Essex, Lake Champlain, and Randolph, backed by shore-based aircraft. By 28 October, the crisis was both peacefully and successfully averted, after the United States secretly agreed to remove nuclear missiles from Italy and Turkey.

==== Second and third deployments ====
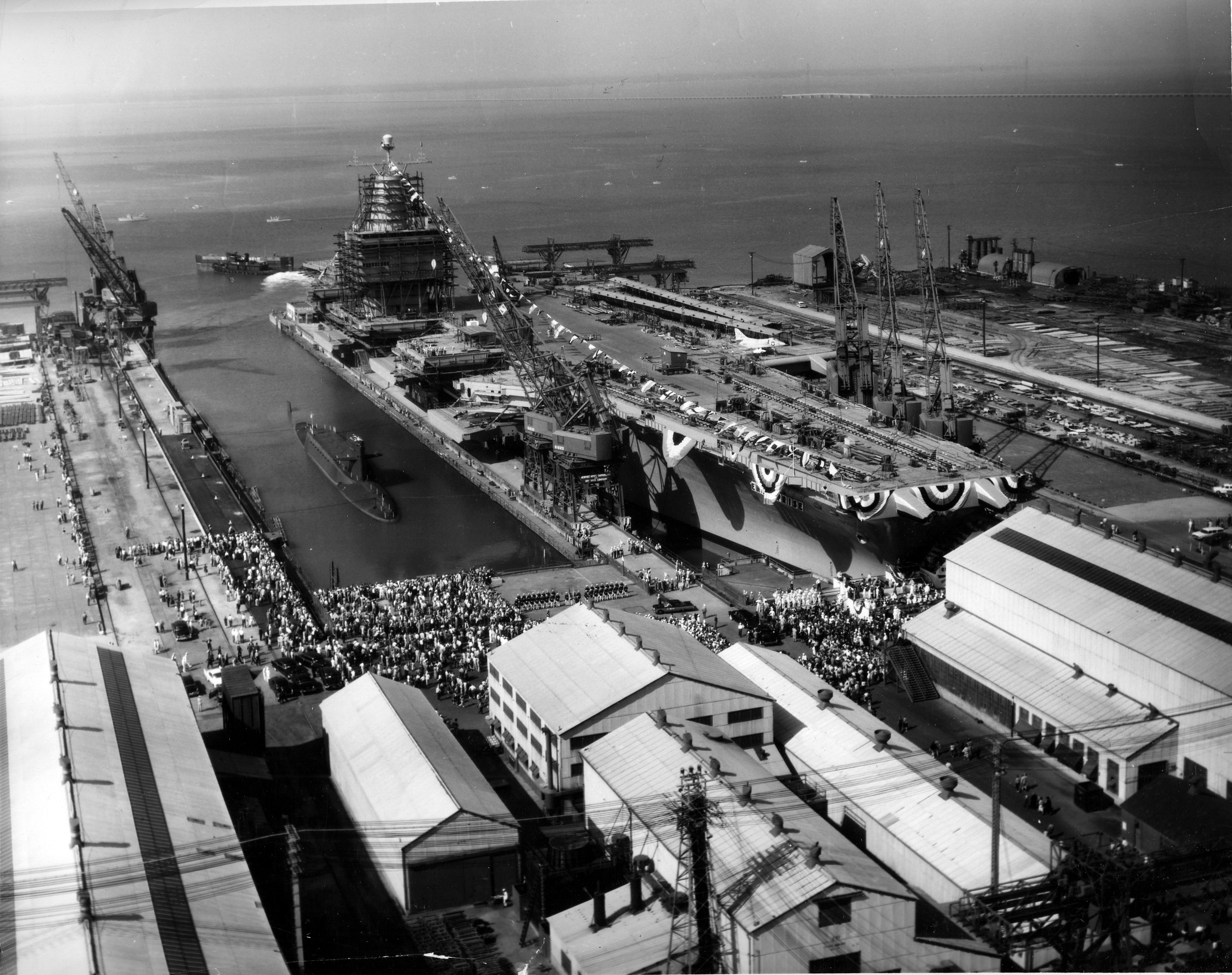
Enterprise was christened at Newport News shipyard in 1960.

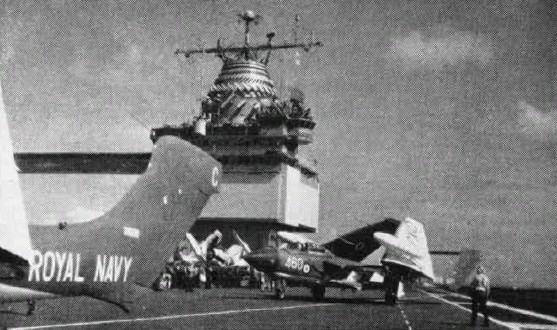
Sea Vixens of 893 NAS operated from Enterprise in 1962.

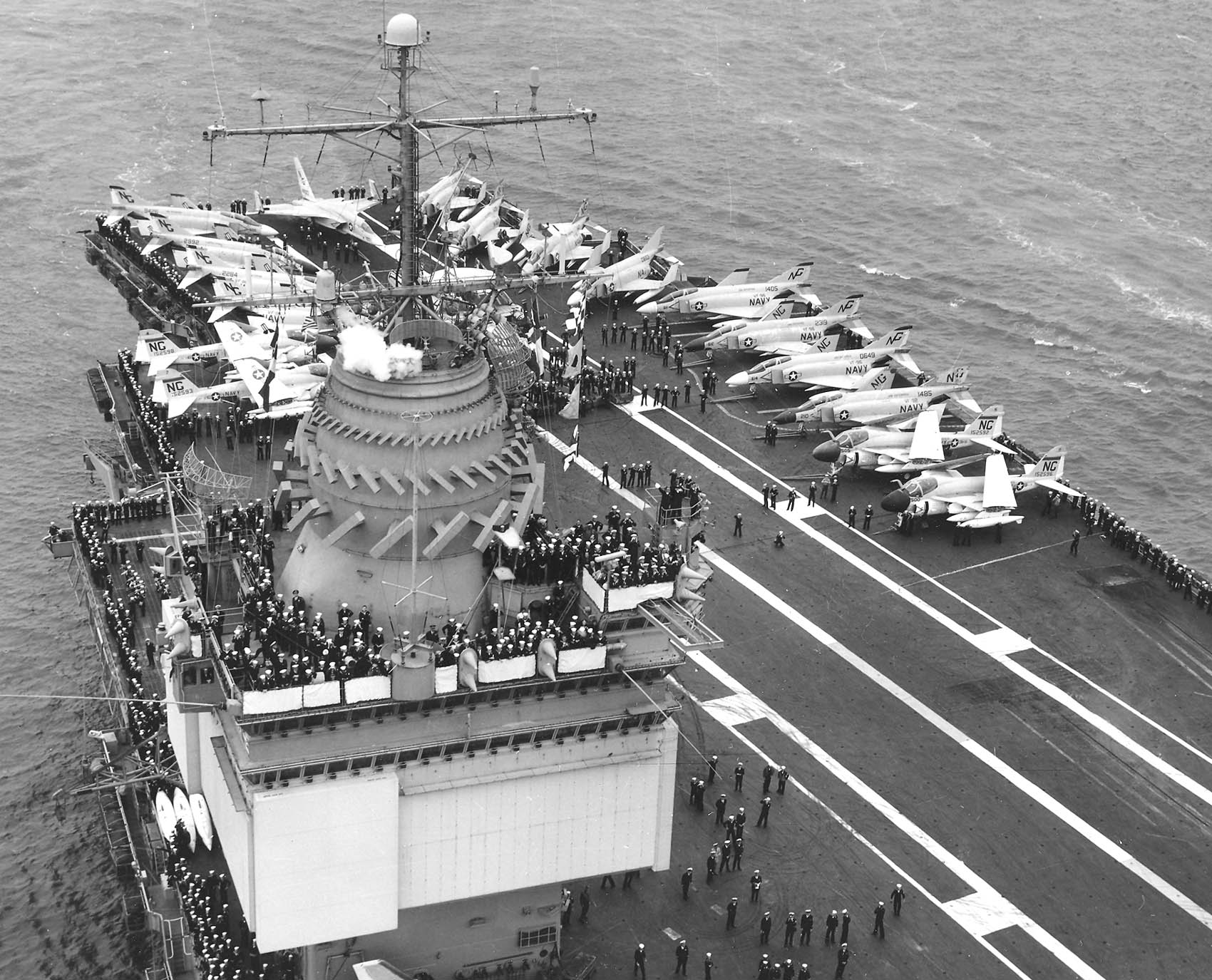
Enterprise in 1967, showing the ship's SCANFAR antennas

On 19 December 1962, a Grumman E-2 Hawkeye was catapulted off Enterprise in the first shipboard test of a nose-wheel launch bar designed to replace the catapult bridle. Minutes later, a second launch with a launch bar was made by a Grumman A-6A Intruder, demonstrating one of the primary design goals of reducing launch intervals.

In 1963–1964, now under command of Captain Frederick H. Michaelis, Enterprise made her second and third deployments to the Mediterranean.

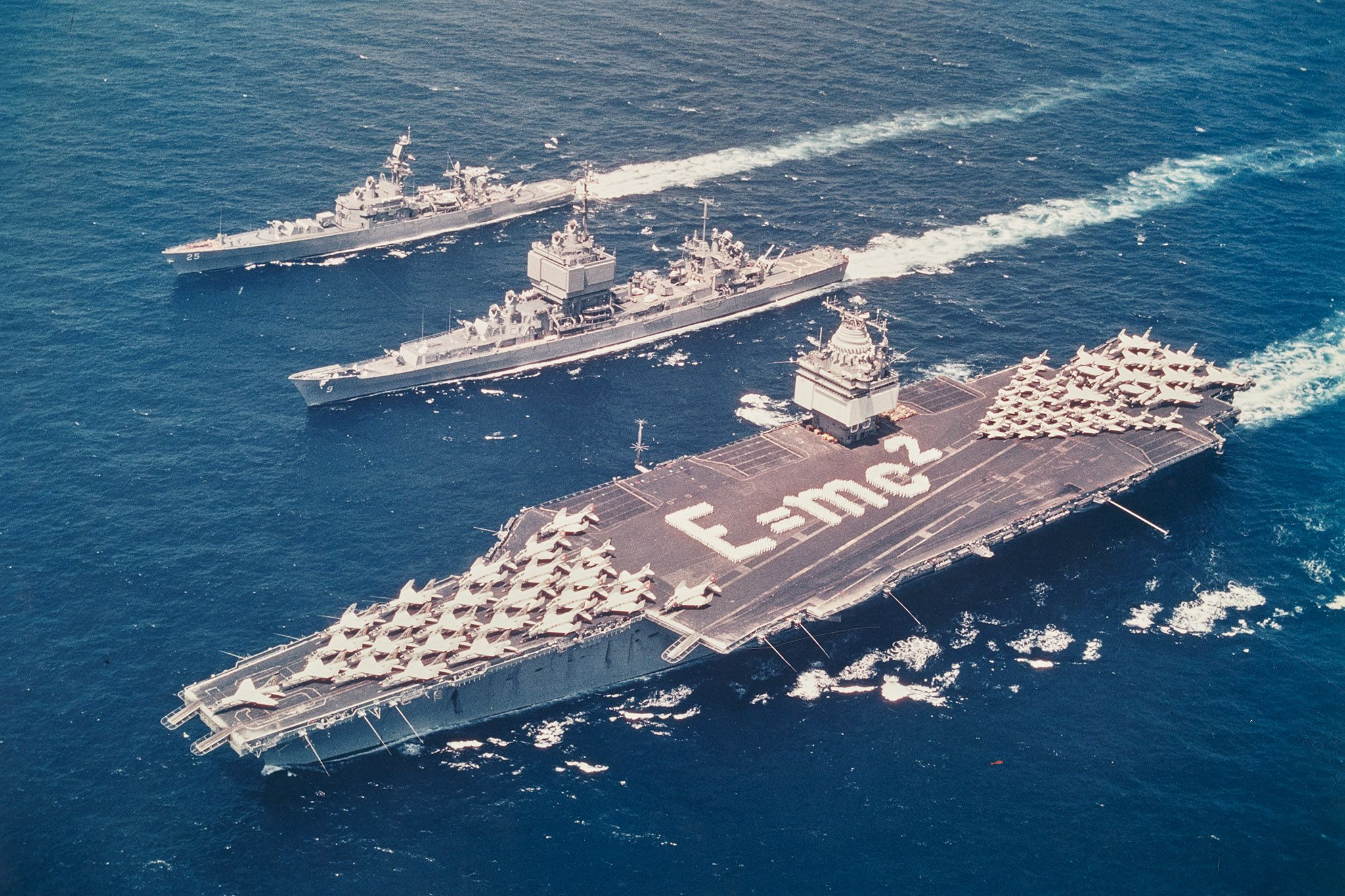
Task Force One, the first nuclear-powered task force. Enterprise, Long Beach and Bainbridge are in formation in the Mediterranean, 18 June 1964. Enterprise has Einstein's mass–energy equivalence formula E=mc² spelled out on her flight deck. Note the distinctive phased-array radars in the superstructures of Enterprise and Long Beach.

During her third deployment, the carrier was part of Operation Sea Orbit, the world's first nuclear-powered task force with the cruisers Long Beach and Bainbridge, together forming a convoy to sail around the world. On 25 February 1964, a crewman of the Finnish merchant ship Verna Paulin was injured in a fall while the ship was in the vicinity of Souda Bay, Greece. Enterprise answered her call for assistance. A surgeon was transferred to Verna Paulin by helicopter. In October 1964, Enterprise returned to Newport News Shipbuilding and Dry Dock Company for her first refueling and overhaul. During this refit, her eight nuclear reactors, which had powered Enterprise as she steamed over 200,000 nmi (230,000 mi; 370,000 km), were refueled, two of her propeller shafts were replaced, and the ship's electronics were updated. Enterprise emerged from her refit on 22 June 1965 and returned to action.

==== Vietnam deployments ====
In November 1965, Enterprise was transferred to the Seventh Fleet, home-ported at NAS Alameda, California. The following month, on 2 December, she became the first nuclear-powered ship to engage in combat when she launched aircraft against the Viet Cong near Biên Hòa City. The ship led Carrier Division Three, with Enterprise (redesignated CVA(N)-65), which had Carrier Air Wing Nine (CVW-9) aboard, Bainbridge; Barry; and Samuel B. Roberts. Enterprise launched 125 sorties on the first day, unleashing 167 short tons (151 t) of bombs and rockets on the enemy's supply lines. On 3 December, she set a record of 165 strike sorties in a single day.

In January 1966, the aircraft carrier was continuing operations as a unit of Task Force 77 in the Gulf of Tonkin, as the flagship of Rear Admiral Henry L. Miller, Commander Carrier Division Three. Under the command of Captain James L. Holloway III, she was carrying a complement of about 350 officers and 4,800 men. Four West Coast squadrons of CVW-9, commanded by Commander F. T. Brown, were embarked; VF-92, under Commander E. A. Rawsthorne, and VF-96, under Commander R. D. Norman, flying F-4B Phantom IIs; VA-93 under Commander A. J. Monger, and VA-94, under Commander O. E. Krueger, flying A-4C Skyhawks. With these squadrons were three others based on the East Coast; VA-36, under Commander J. E. Marshall, VA-76, under Commander J. B. Linder, flying A-4C Skyhawks; and RVAH-7, under Commander K. Enny, flying RA-5C Vigilantes. Rear Admiral Miller was relieved as Commander Carrier Division Three by Rear Admiral T. J. Walker on 16 February 1966. During the change-of-command ceremony on the flight deck, Rear Admiral Miller praised the ship's performance in his farewell remarks and presented air medals to more than 100 pilots and flight officers.

The ship tied up at Leyte Pier, U.S. Naval Base Subic Bay, on the evening of 8 December 1966. Loading of supplies for the first line period was started immediately. Rear Admiral Walter L Curtis Jr, Commander Carrier Division Nine, brought his flag aboard. In company with Manley, Gridley, and Bainbridge, Enterprise sailed for Yankee Station on 15 December, and took up her position there three days later.

When Enterprise departed the Gulf of Tonkin on 20 June 1967, her pilots had flown more than 13,400 battle missions during 132 combat days of operations. (Enterprise Command History 1967, 29) As Vice Admiral Hyland stated in his congratulatory statement, "the entire Air Wing Nine has earned a resounding 'Well Done'." The carrier had steamed 67,630 miles in operations with the Seventh Fleet. She arrived in Subic Bay on 22 June and departed on 25 June for return to Alameda on 6 July 1967.

At Alameda, Enterprise began an overhaul. Captain Kent Lee relieved Captain James L. Holloway as commanding officer in ceremonies on 11 July 1967. Shipyard work was completed on 5 September 1967, and after completing sea trials on 7 September, Enterprise steamed south from San Francisco Bay to San Diego to re-embark CVW-9 and get underway for refresher training off the California coast.

Enterprise was visiting Sasebo, Japan, in January 1968 when the US intelligence ship USS Pueblo was seized by North Korea, and she served as flagship of TF 71 (Rear Admiral Epes), which had been formed in response and they operated near South Korean waters for almost a month, during Operation Formation Star. When diplomatic negotiations had defused tensions, Enterprise and her escorts were released to head south to Yankee Station on 16 February 1968. Enterprise returned to NAS Alameda on 18 July 1968, having completed 12,839 catapult launches, with 12,246 sorties – 9,182 of them combat. After a short overhaul in Puget Sound Naval Shipyard from 29 July to 26 September, she returned to Alameda to prepare for another deployment to Vietnam.

=== 1969 fire ===
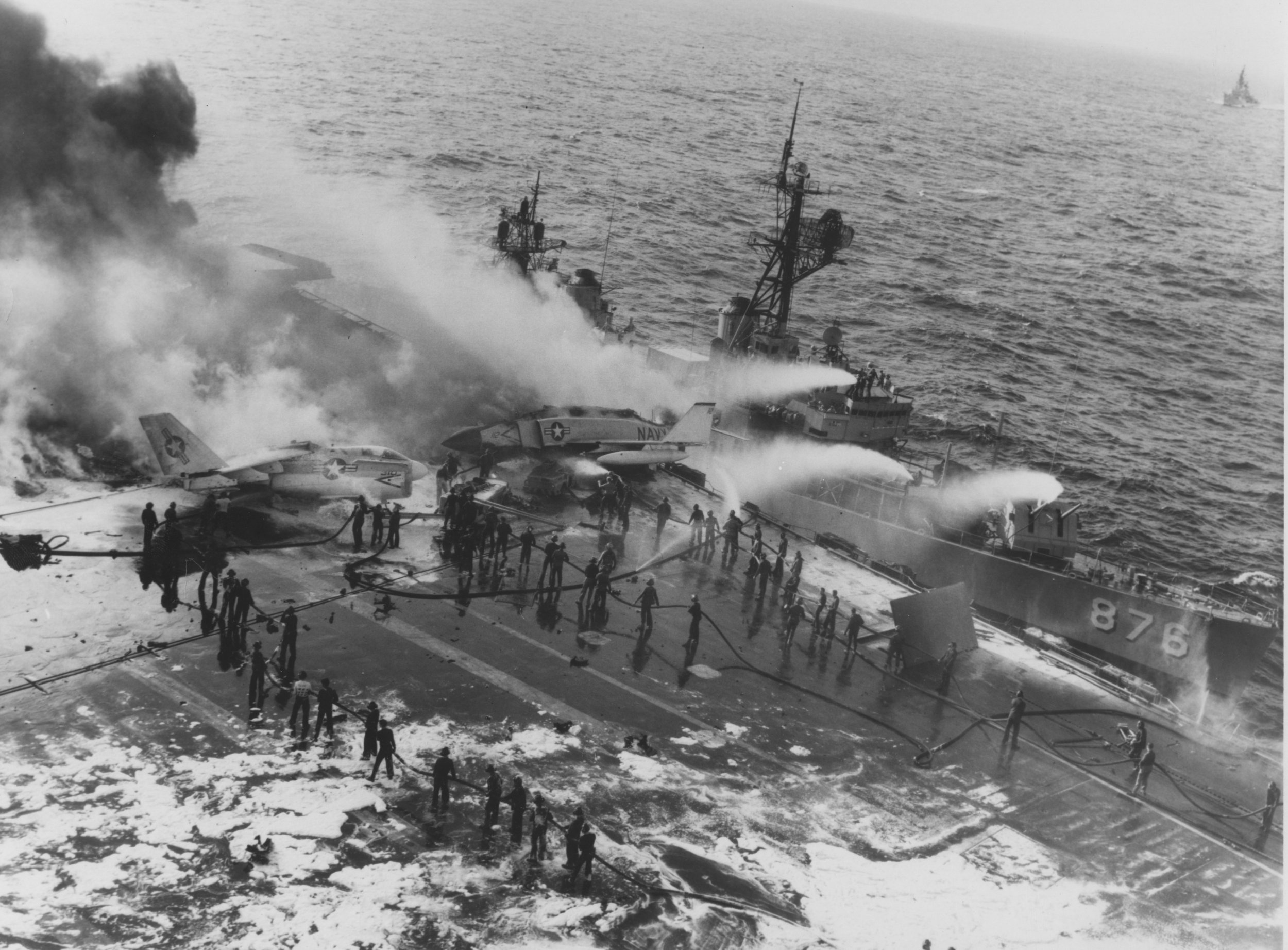
Sailors from the destroyer Rogers use their on-board hoses to assist with the firefighting efforts aboard Enterprise.

During the morning of 14 January 1969, while being escorted by the destroyers Benjamin Stoddert and Rogers, a MK-32 Zuni rocket loaded on a parked F-4 Phantom exploded when ordnance cooked off after being overheated by an aircraft start unit. The explosion set off fires and additional explosions across the flight deck.

The fires were brought under control relatively quickly (when compared with previous carrier flight deck fires), but 27 sailors were killed, and an additional 314 sailors were injured. The fire destroyed 15 aircraft, and the resulting damage forced Enterprise to put in for repairs at Pearl Harbor Naval Shipyard, Hawaii, primarily to repair the flight deck's armored plating. On 1 March 1969, repairs to the ship were completed and the ship proceeded on her scheduled western Pacific (WESTPAC) deployment to Vietnam and the Tonkin Gulf. These destinations would be delayed by events in the eastern Sea of Japan.

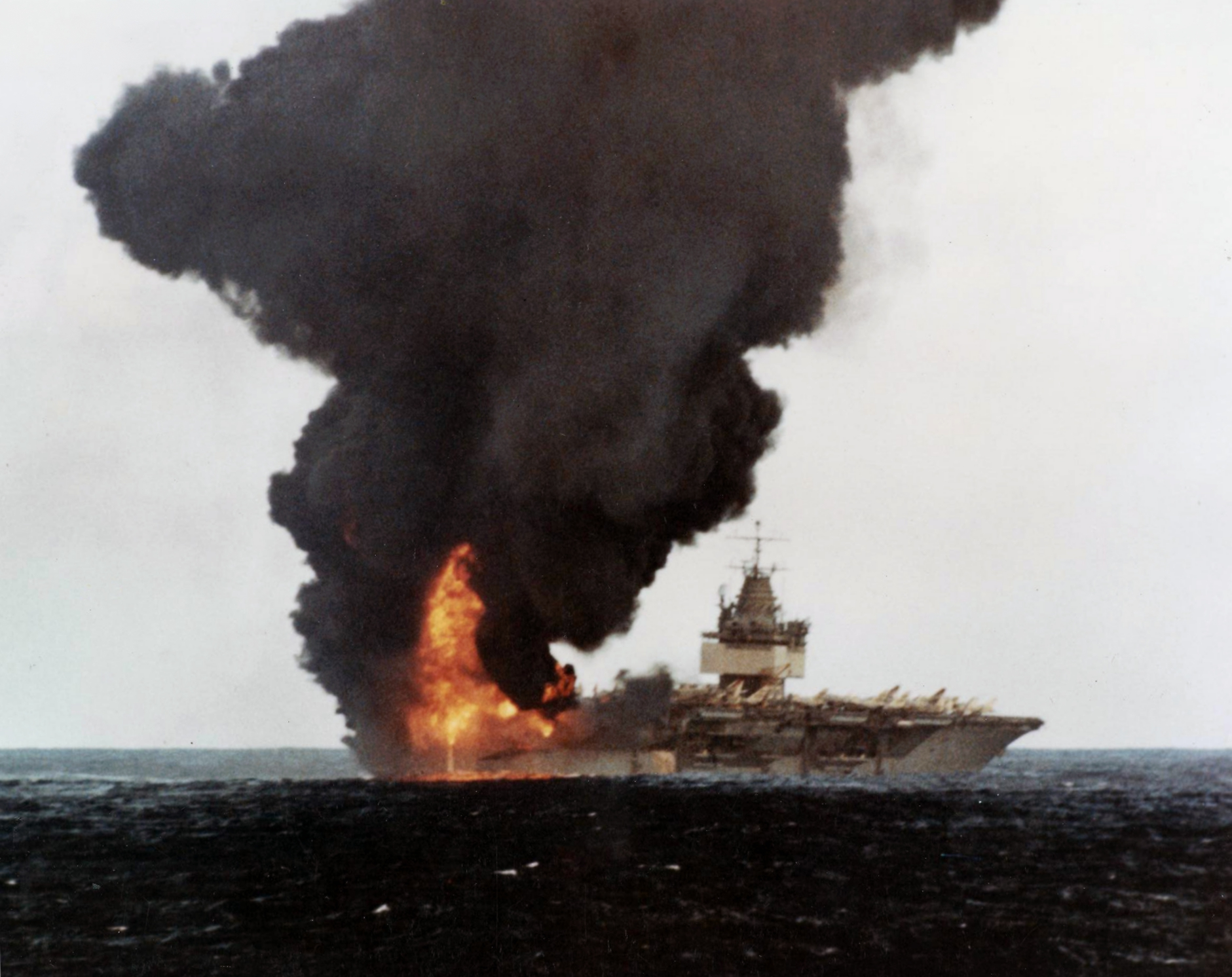
View of Enterprise's stern during the fire, January 1969

=== Korean operations ===
On 14 April 1969, tensions with North Korea flared again as a North Korean aircraft shot down a Lockheed EC-121 Warning Star that was on a reconnaissance patrol over the eastern Sea of Japan from its base at Atsugi, Japan. The entire 31-man crew was killed. The US responded by activating Task Force 71 (TF 71) to protect future such flights over those international waters. Initially, the task force was to comprise Enterprise, Ticonderoga, Ranger, and Hornet with a screen of cruisers and destroyers. Enterprise arrived on station with TF 71 in late April after completion of repairs. The ships for TF 71 came mostly from Southeast Asia duty. This deployment became one of the largest shows of force in the area since the Korean War.

=== 1970s ===
In 1969–1970, Enterprise returned to Newport News Shipbuilding and went through an overhaul and her second refitting. In January 1971, she completed sea trials with newly designed nuclear reactor cores that contained enough energy for 10 years. On 11 June 1971 Enterprise, with Captain Forrest S. Petersen now in command and Carrier Air Wing Fourteen (CVW-14) onboard, then departed for Vietnam again.

==== South and Southeast Asia ====
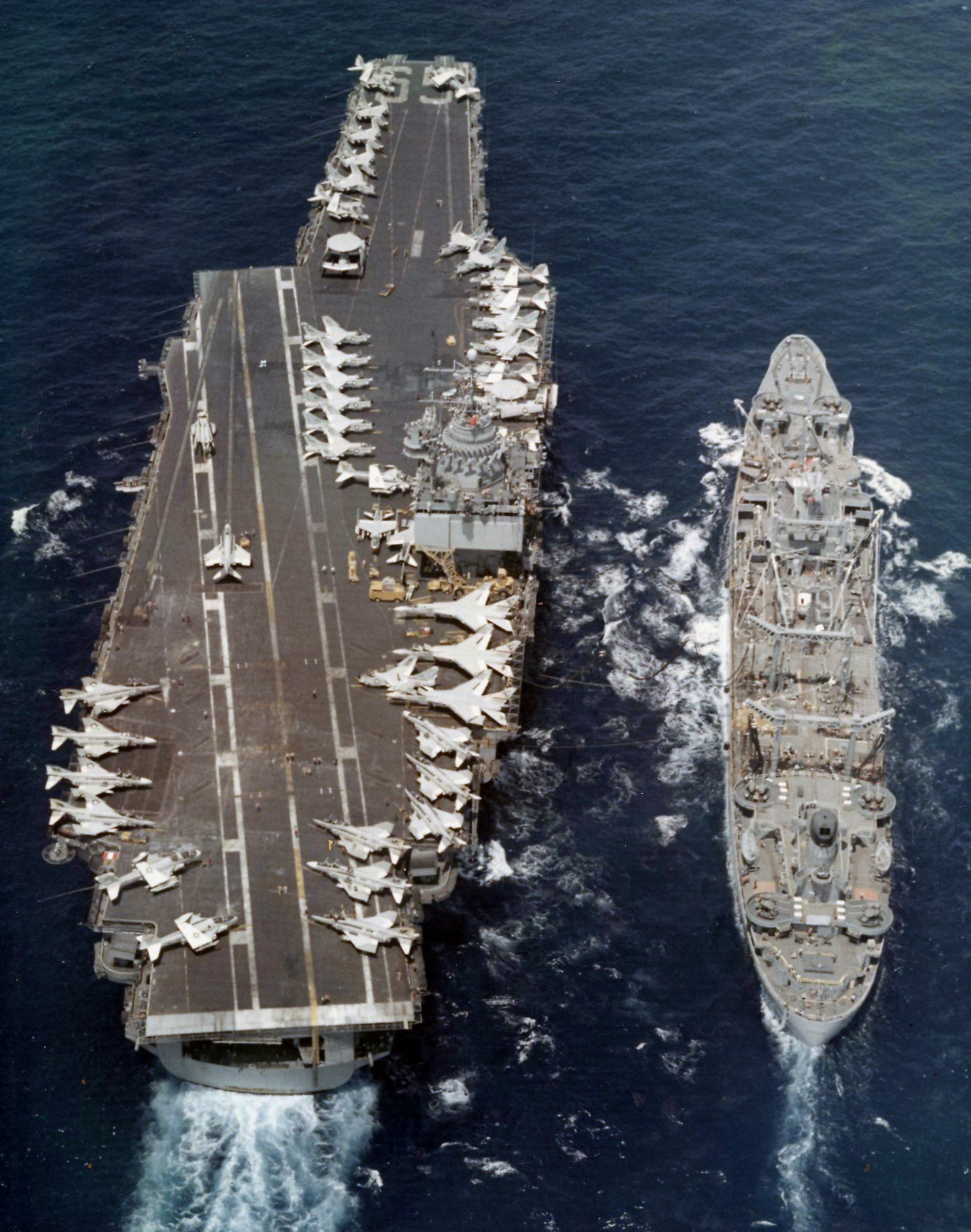
Enterprise during an underway replenishment with the fleet oiler Hassayampa in the South China Sea in 1973

Enterprise, Oriskany and Midway launched a total of 2,001 strike sorties by 30 July 1971. Strike operations in July were disrupted when the carriers on station evaded three typhoons: Harriet, Kim, and Jean. A slight increase in South Vietnam strike sorties occurred during the month. These were mainly visual strikes against enemy troop positions and in support of U.S. helicopter operations. From August–November 1971, Enterprise was in operations on Yankee Station.

In December 1971, Captain Ernest E. Tissot Jr. assumed command, and Enterprise was deployed to the Bay of Bengal, during the Indo-Pakistani War of 1971 as a show of strength against India's naval blockade by INS Vikrant. Later, a Soviet Navy submarine was also trailing the US task force. A confrontation was averted when Enterprise moved away from the Indian Ocean toward Southeast Asia. Enterprise completed her deployment on 12 February 1972.

Enterprise returned to the South China Sea from 12 September 1972 with CVW-14 onboard. On 18 December 1972, the United States resumed bombing campaigns above the 20th parallel under the name Linebacker II. During Linebacker II operations, Enterprise and other carriers on station reseeded the mine fields in Haiphong harbor and conducted concentrated strikes against surface-to-air missile and antiaircraft artillery sites, enemy army barracks, petroleum storage areas, Haiphong naval and shipyard areas, and railroad and truck stations. Navy tactical air attack sorties under Linebacker II were centered in the coastal areas around Hanoi and Haiphong. There were 705 Navy sorties in this area during Linebacker II. Between 18 and 22 December, the Navy conducted 119 Linebacker II strikes in North Vietnam, with the main limiting factor on airstrikes being bad weather. In December 1972, the North Vietnamese returned to the peace table and Linebacker II ended. In January 1973, the Vietnam cease fire was announced, and American carriers ceased all combat sorties into North and South Vietnam. From 28 January 1973, aircraft from Enterprise and Ranger flew 81 combat sorties against lines-of-communication targets in Laos. The corridor for overflights was between Huế and Da Nang in South Vietnam. These combat support sorties were flown in support of the Laotian government, which had requested this assistance. Laos had no relationship with the ceasefire in Vietnam. Enterprise completed her deployment on 12 June 1973.

==== Post-Vietnam ====
After the cease fire in Vietnam in 1973, Enterprise proceeded to the Puget Sound Naval Shipyard, Bremerton, Washington, where the carrier was altered and refitted to support the Navy's newest fighter aircraft – the Grumman F-14 Tomcat. Two of four jet blast deflectors were enlarged to accommodate the Tomcat. The No. 4 propulsion shaft was replaced; it had been bent when its screw became fouled in a discarded arresting gear cable.

On 18 March 1974, the first operational Tomcats of VF-1 Wolfpack and VF-2 Bounty Hunters made their maiden takeoffs and landings from the carrier. In September 1974, Enterprise became the first carrier to deploy with the new fighter plane when she made her seventh WESTPAC deployment.

In February 1975, Typhoon Gervaise struck the island nation of Mauritius, and Enterprise was ordered to provide disaster relief. Arriving at Port Louis, carrier personnel spent more than 10,000 man-hours rendering such assistance as restoring water, power, and telephone systems, clearing roads and debris, and providing helicopter, medical, food and drinkable water support to the stricken area.

==== Operation Frequent Wind ====
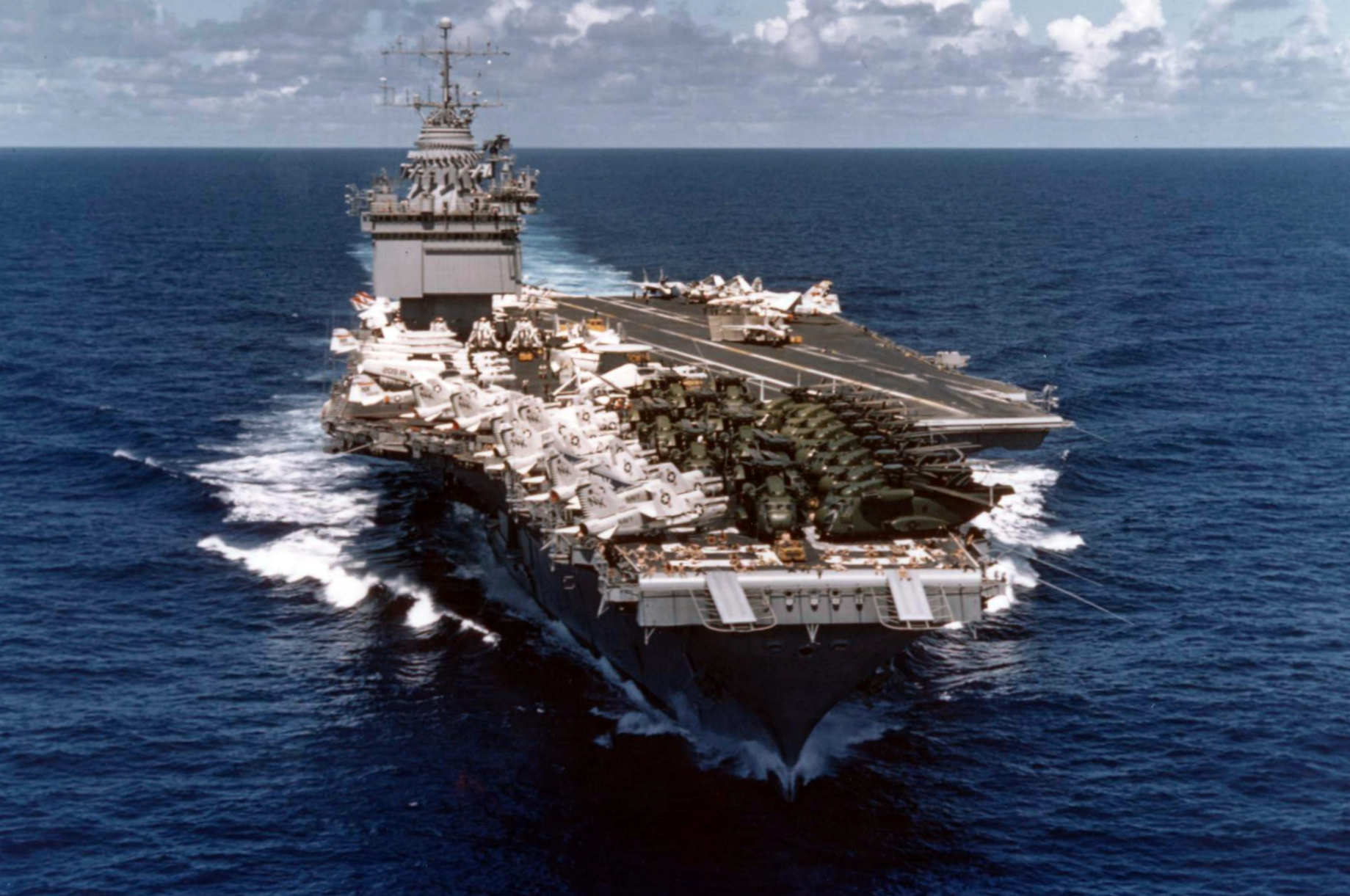
Enterprise en route back to the United States following the evacuation of Saigon; the forward end of the flight deck contains a number of USMC CH-53 Sea Stallion helicopters.

In April 1975, Enterprise, Midway, Coral Sea, Hancock and Okinawa were deployed to waters off South Vietnam for possible evacuation contingencies as North Vietnam, in violation of the Paris Peace Accords, launched a conventional invasion of South Vietnam. On 29 April, Operation Frequent Wind was carried out by U.S. Navy and U.S. Marine Corps helicopters from the 7th Fleet. The operation involved the evacuation of American citizens and "at-risk" Vietnamese from Saigon, the capital of South Vietnam under heavy attack from the invading forces of North Vietnam.

President Gerald Ford ordered helicopter evacuation when PAVN shelling forced the cessation of fixed-wing evacuation from Tan Son Nhut Airport. With fighter cover provided by carrier aircraft, the helicopters landed at the US Embassy, Saigon, and the DAO Compound to pick up evacuees. The last helicopter lifted off the roof of the United States Embassy at 7:53 am, local time, on 30 April 1975 carrying the last 11 Marine security guards. During Operation Frequent Wind, aircraft from Enterprise flew 95 sorties. VF-1 and VF-2, flying from Enterprise, made the first combat deployment of the F-14 Tomcat.

==== Eighth and ninth deployments ====
In July 1976, Enterprise began her eighth Western Pacific deployment. Beginning in October, she took part in the ANZUS exercise Kangaroo II with ships of the Australian and New Zealand Navies.

One of the ports visited was Hobart, Tasmania in November 1976. It had also been the first time an American ship anchored in the capital's harbor, Hobart, since the early 1920s. A beer with a picture of the Enterprise for its label was just one of the commemorations received by the renowned nuclear carrier.

In February 1977, Idi Amin, the president of Uganda, made derogatory remarks against the United States in public, and Americans in Uganda were taken hostage. This was several months after the Israeli raid at Entebbe airport. Enterprise and her escort ships were scheduled to transit home after a seven-month deployment, but having just left Mombasa after a port call, were directed to remain in the area and operated off the East African coast for about one week. The ship's Marine detachment and air wing prepared for a possible mission to rescue and evacuate the Americans, but Amin eventually released all the hostages. The ships then steamed across the Indian Ocean at high speed to make a previously scheduled final port call at NAS Cubi Point in the Philippines before returning to NAS Alameda.

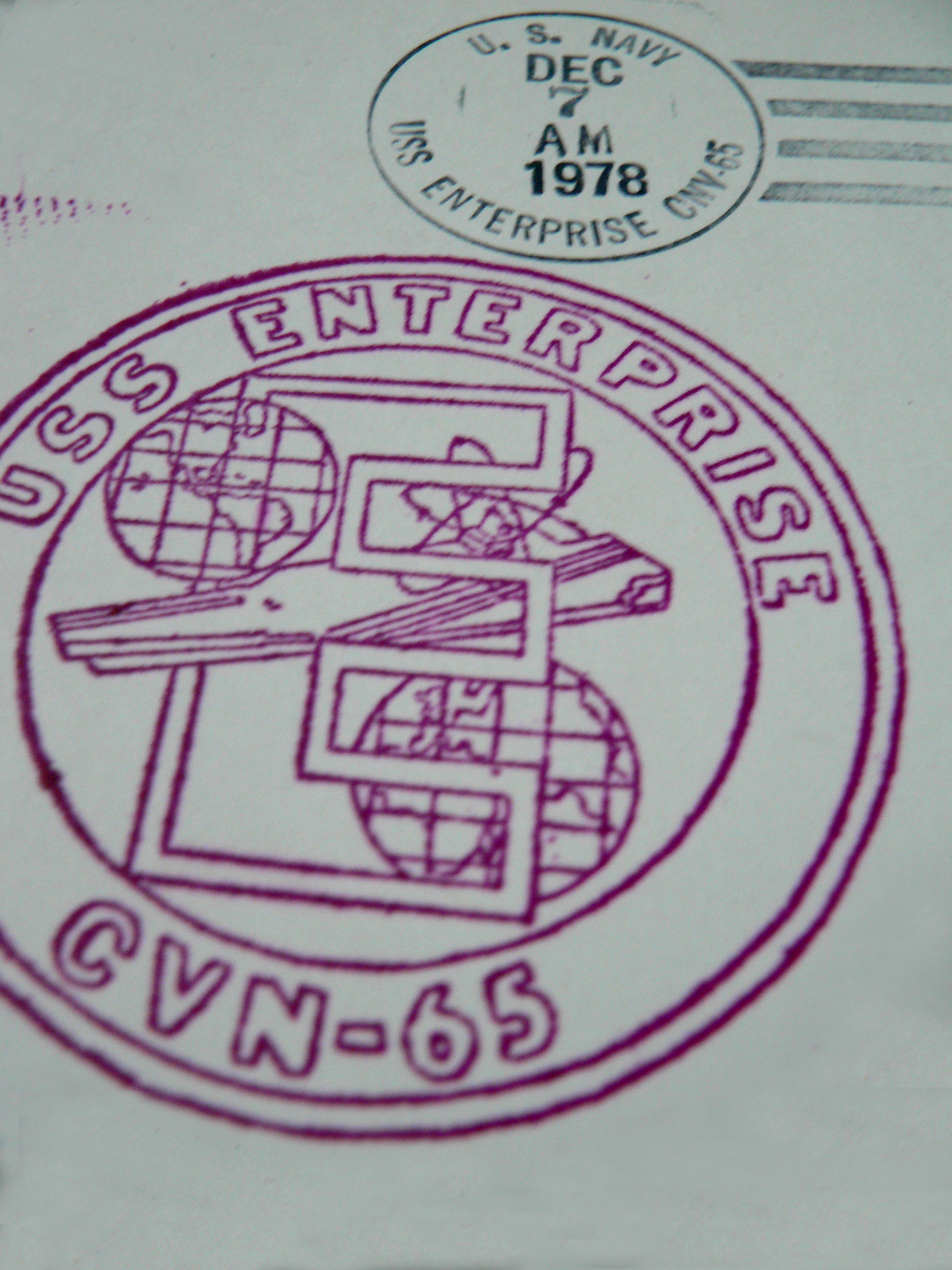
Maritime Mail – USS Enterprise – CVN-65 – US Navy Dec 7 am 1978

In 1978, Enterprise underwent her ninth Western Pacific deployment, the last before the ship's planned major refit. The 1978 WESTPAC cruise included port calls in Hong Kong, Perth, Australia, and Singapore, and ended at the end of the year. In January 1979, the carrier arrived at Puget Sound Naval Shipyard for the intended 36-month refurbishment. This overhaul modified the ship's superstructure – removing the SCANFAR radars and the unique inverted, cone-shaped top section, which was three stories high. During the lengthy overhaul, Navy and shipyard personnel referred to Enterprise as Building 65.

=== 1980s ===
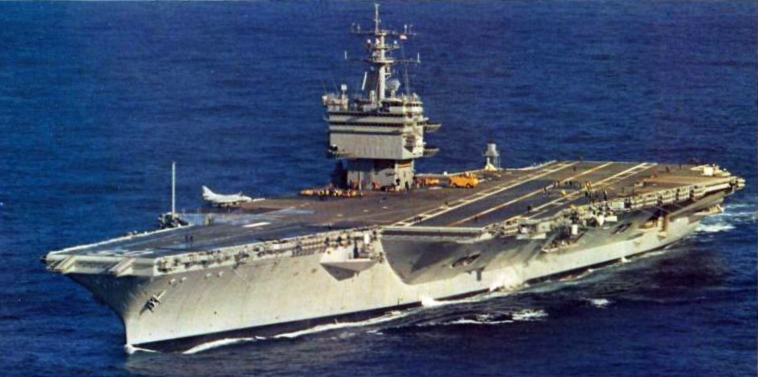
Enterprise in 1982 following her major 36-month refit

In 1982, the carrier made her 10th WESTPAC deployment. In April 1983, Enterprise ran aground on a sandbar in San Francisco Bay while returning from deployment, and remained stuck there for several hours. Coincidentally, George Takei, who played Mr. Sulu, helmsman of the fictional starship Enterprise, was aboard at the time as a guest of the Navy. Though groundings and collisions are usually career-ending events for U.S. warship captains, the captain at the time, Robert J. Kelly, who had already been selected for promotion to commodore, eventually became a four-star admiral and commander-in-chief of the US Pacific Fleet.

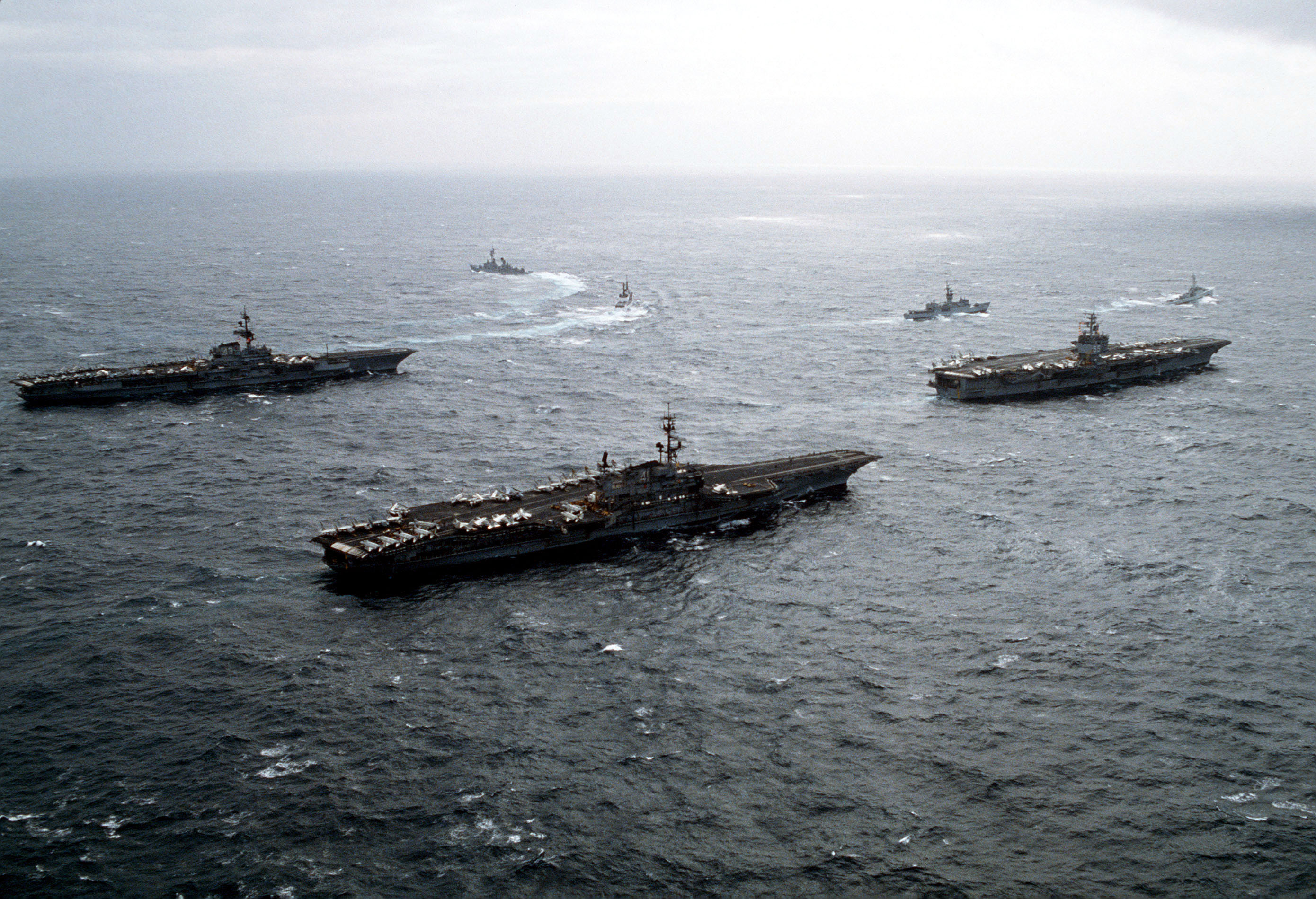
Enterprise (right) operating with the Midway-class carriers Coral Sea (top left) and Midway (bottom left) off Alaska during the FLEETEX 1983 exercise

In 1985, the Enterprise began training for her 11th WESTPAC deployment. Late at night on 2 November 1985 with Captain Robert L. Leuschner Jr. on the bridge, she struck Bishop Rock on the Cortes Bank during flight exercises, damaging the outer hull with a gash more than 100 feet in length and knocking out of one screw, a chip whose size was illustrated with a photograph of a Navy diver stretched out and reclining inside the notch. The cost of repairing the damage was $17 million, and Leuschner was relieved of command on 27 January 1986 as a result of the incident, by Captain Robert J. Spane.

In 1986, the carrier made her 12th WESTPAC deployment, leaving on 15 January 1986. She led Battle Group FOXTROT, including Truxtun, Arkansas, O'Brien, Reasoner, Lewis B. Puller, McClusky, David R. Ray and Wabash. The Battle Group sailed directly for the Indian Ocean, with stops in Hawaii, Subic Bay, and Singapore. On 28 April 1986, Enterprise became the first nuclear-powered aircraft carrier to transit the Suez Canal. She went from the Red Sea to the Mediterranean to relieve Coral Sea, on station with America off the coast of Libya. Enterprise entered the Mediterranean to support "Operation El Dorado Canyon", the US bombing of Libya. It was the ship's first visit to the Mediterranean in more than 22 years. During the deployment, Rear Admiral J.T. Howe was relieved as Commander Cruiser-Destroyer Group 3 by Rear Admiral Paul David Miller.

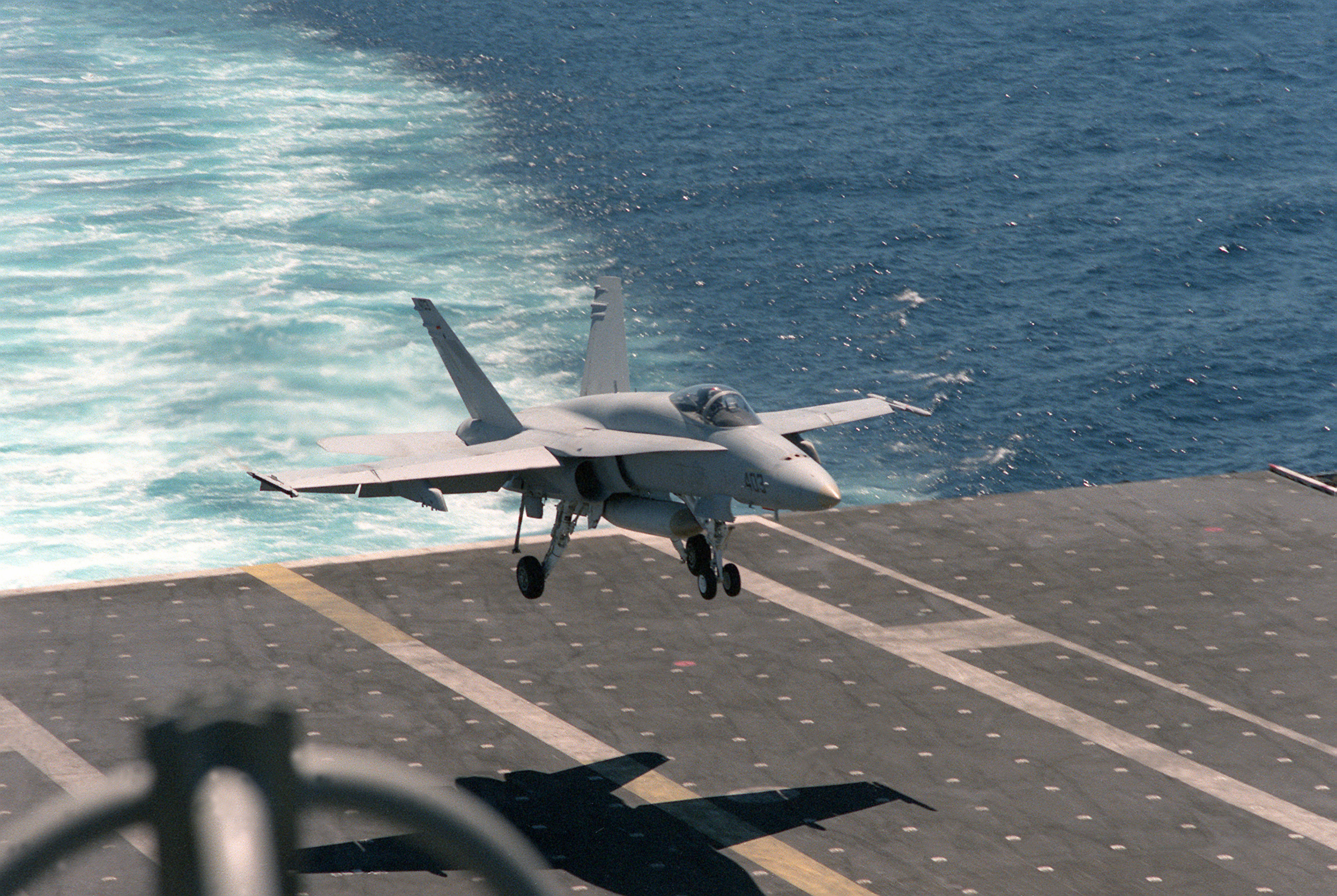
An F/A-18A Hornet lands on Enterprise in 1987.

In February 1988, Enterprise underwent her 13th deployment and was assigned to Operation Earnest Will, escorting reflagged Kuwaiti oil tankers in the Persian Gulf. On 14 April, another Earnest Will ship, Samuel B. Roberts, struck an Iranian mine in international waters. In response, the US launched Operation Praying Mantis against Iranian targets, starting with two Iranian oil platforms that were being used as support bases for Iranian attacks on merchant shipping. Aircraft from Enterprise's CVW-11 bombed two Iranian frigates, helping to sink one and damaged the other, and provided other air support for the strike.

In September 1989, Enterprise left Alameda and began her 14th overseas deployment, an around-the-world cruise that would end at the ship's new homeport of Naval Station Norfolk, Virginia. In early December 1989, Enterprise and Midway participated in Operation Classic Resolve, President George H. W. Bush's response to Philippine President Corazon Aquino's request for air support during the rebel coup attempt. Enterprise remained on station conducting flight operations in the waters outside Manila Bay until the situation subsided.

=== 1990s ===
In April 1990, Enterprise completed her around-the-world deployment, arriving in Norfolk, Virginia. In October, the carrier moved to Newport News Shipbuilding for refueling and the Navy's largest complex overhaul refit ever attempted. On 27 September 1994, Enterprise returned to sea for sea trials, now with Captain Richard J. Naughton in command, during which she performed an extended full power run as fast as when she was new.

On 28 June 1996, Enterprise began her 15th overseas deployment. The carrier enforced no-fly zones in Bosnia as part of Operation Joint Endeavor and over Iraq as part of Operation Southern Watch. The deployment ended in December 1996, which also marked the end of active service for the Grumman A-6 Intruder from the Navy. February 1997, Enterprise entered Newport News Shipbuilding for an extended selective restrictive availability lasting four-and-a-half months.

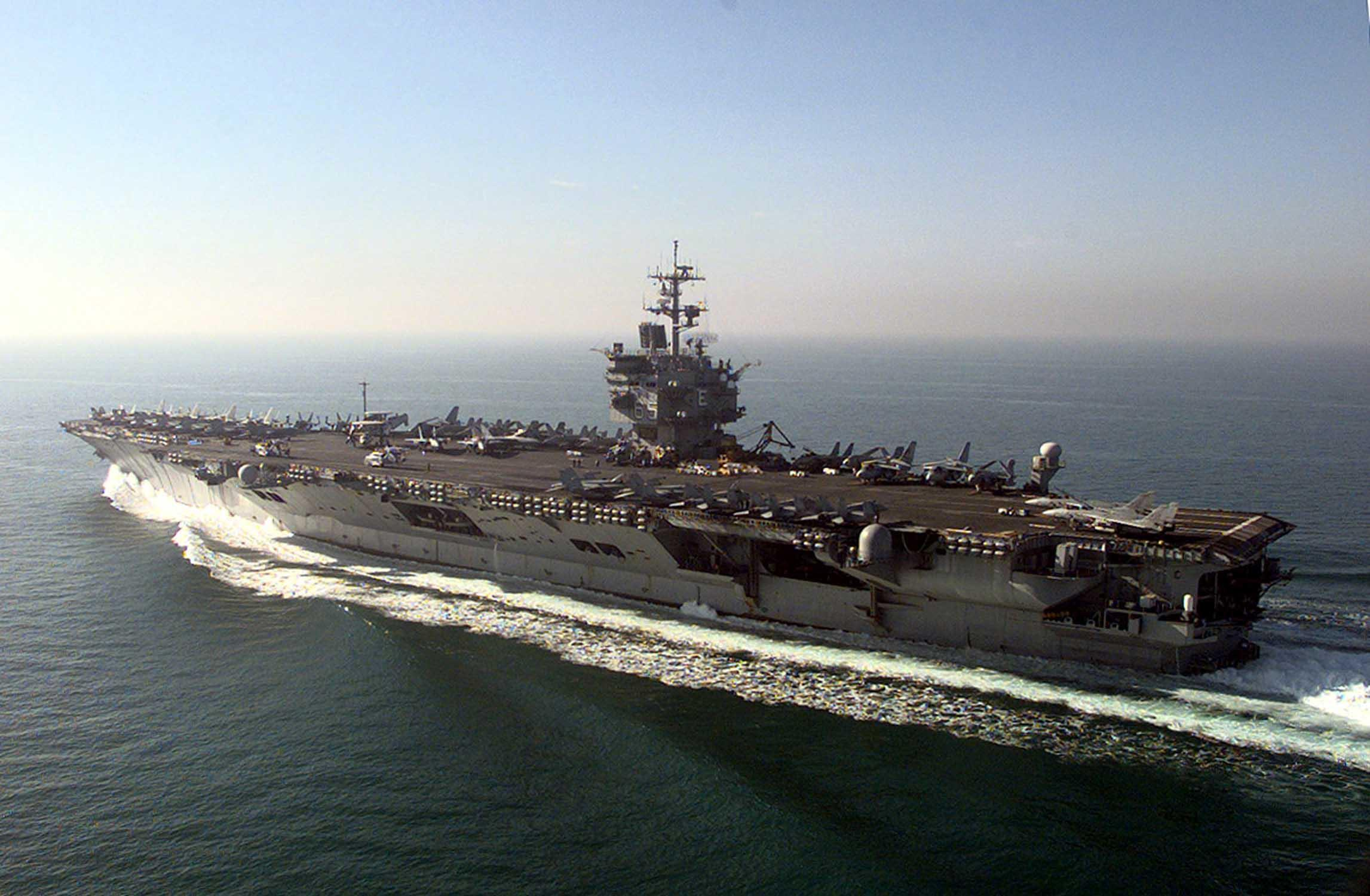
Enterprise patrols the Persian Gulf in support of Operation Desert Fox.

In November 1998, following workups, Enterprise departed on her 16th overseas deployment, with CVW-3 embarked. On the night of 8 November, shortly after the start of the deployment, a Northrop Grumman EA-6B Prowler crashed into a Lockheed S-3 Viking on the carrier's flight deck. The mishap occurred as the EA-6B was landing during night carrier qualifications, striking the folded wings of the S-3, which had not yet cleared the landing area of the flight deck.

The four-man crew of the EA-6B perished when the aircraft hit the water, but the two crew members of the S-3 ejected. A fire broke out on the flight deck but was quickly extinguished by the flight deck crew. Three of the four members of the Prowler crew were lost at sea, and the remains of the fourth were recovered shortly after the crash. The crew of the Viking were rushed to the Naval Medical Center Portsmouth, Virginia. There were no other significant injuries. An exhaustive search for three missing EA-6B Prowler crew members was suspended after nearly 24 hours.

On 23 November 1998, Enterprise relieved Dwight D. Eisenhower in the Persian Gulf.

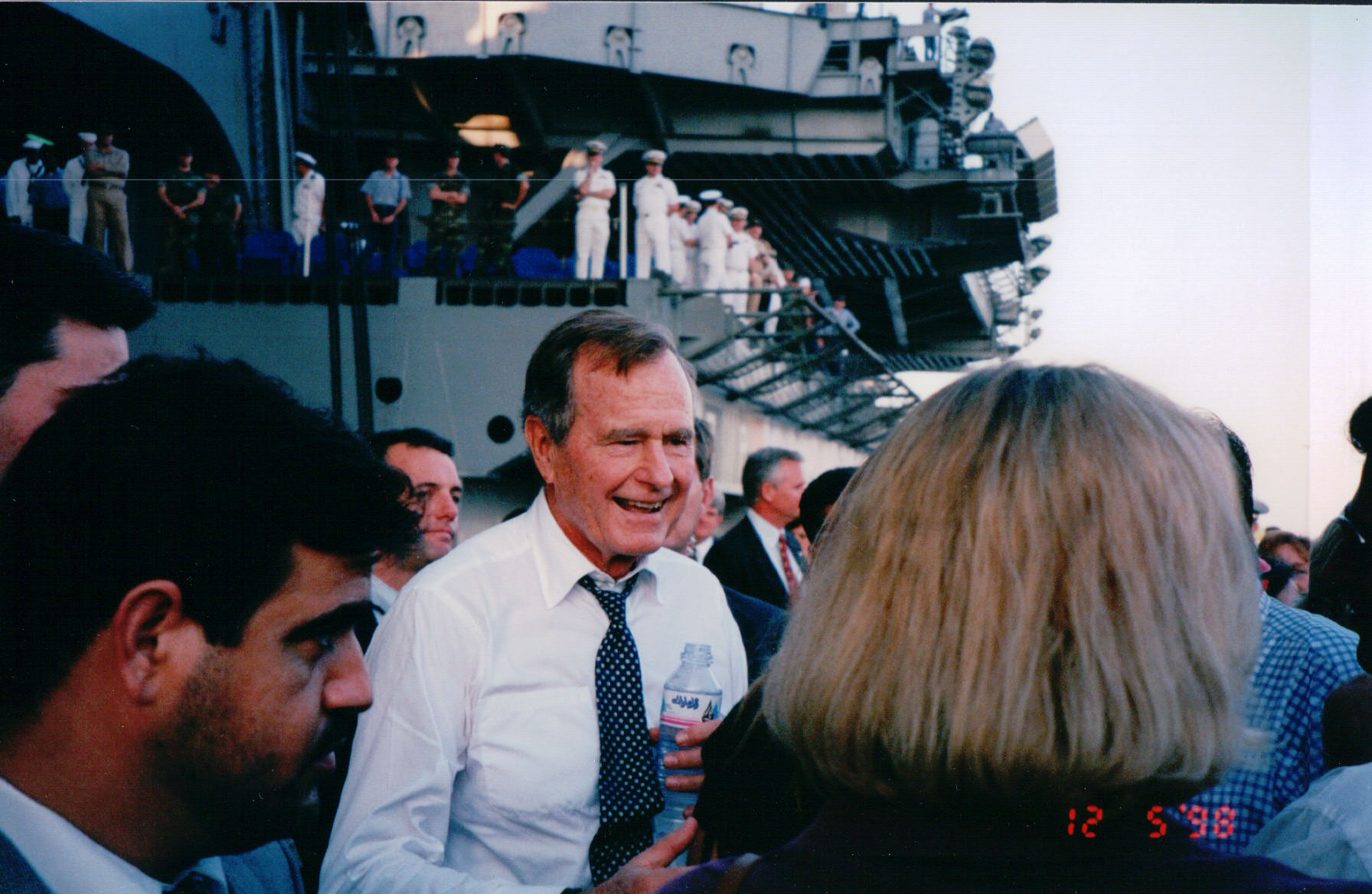
Former President Bush visits Enterprise on 5 December 1998.

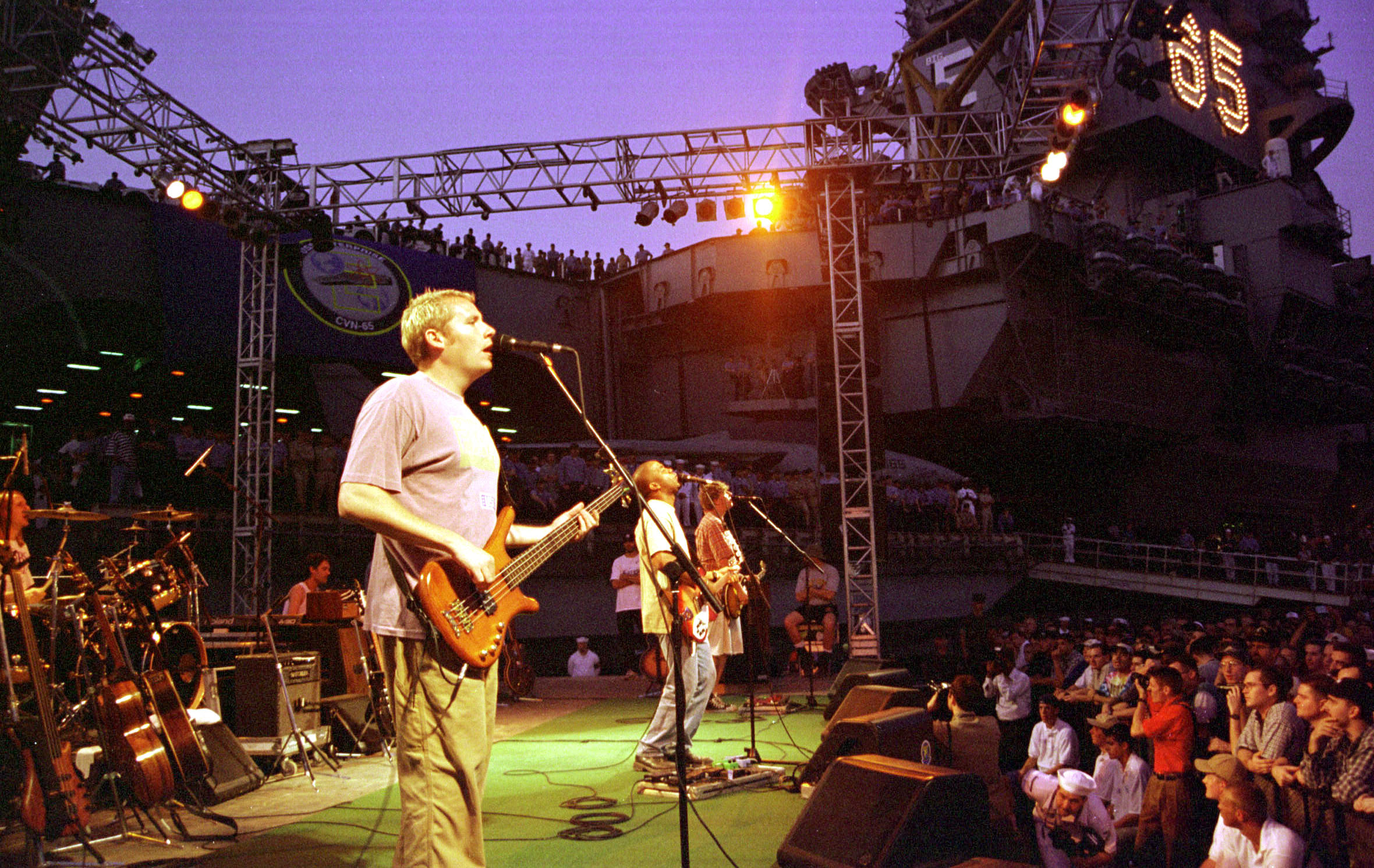
Hootie and the Blowfish play for Enterprise crew on 5 December 1998.

During a port call in Jebel Ali, UAE, the carrier hosted former president George H. W. Bush and enjoyed a live concert by rock group Hootie & the Blowfish.

In December 1998, Enterprise battlegroup spearheaded Operation Desert Fox, destroying Iraqi military targets with more than 300 Tomahawk land attack missiles and 691,000 lb (346 short tons; 313 tonnes) of ordnance. The 70-hour assault was carried out by Enterprise, Gettysburg, Stout, Nicholson and Miami.

Shortly after the Račak massacre and failure of Yugoslavian peace talks in Rambouillet, France, Enterprise quickly left a port visit in Cannes, France, to return to the Adriatic.

In early March 1999, Enterprise returned to the Persian Gulf to relieve Carl Vinson in support of Operation Southern Watch, returning to Norfolk in May 1999.

During the 1998–1999 deployment, Enterprise steamed more than 50,000 nmi (93,000 km; 58,000 mi) and spent 151 days underway. Enterprise Battle Group was the first to deploy with IT-21, which allowed unprecedented internal and external communication capabilities, including Internet, email, and television.

=== 2000s ===
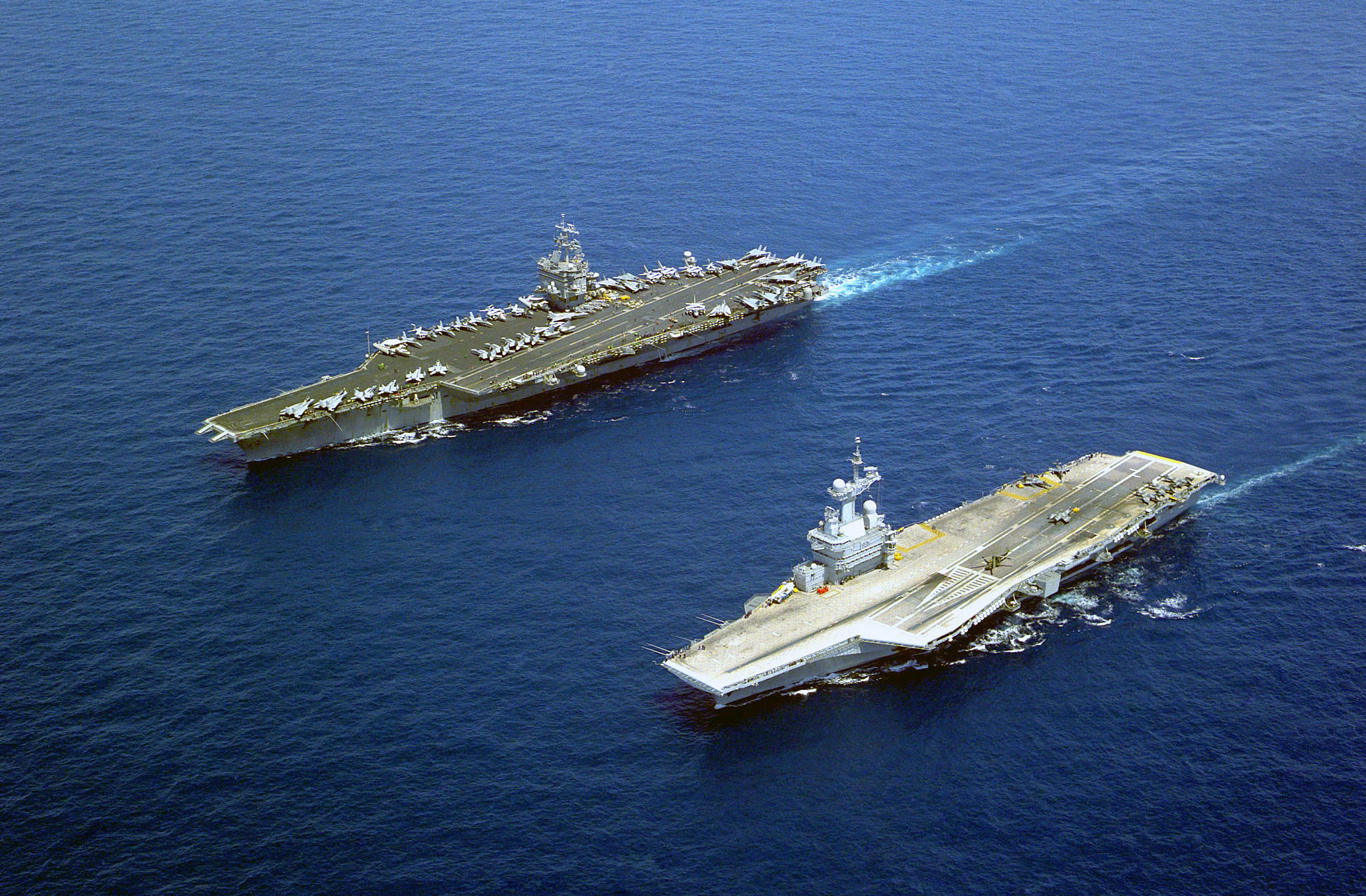
Enterprise, the first nuclear-powered carrier (left) with what was then the newest: French carrier Charles de Gaulle, 16 May 2001

In March 2001, Enterprise took part in the exercise JTFEX 01-2 in the Caribbean Sea. U24, a Type 206 class diesel-electric submarine with the German Navy, managed to "sink" the Enterprise by firing flares and taking a photograph through its periscope.

On 25 April 2001, Enterprise began her 17th overseas deployment with CVW-8 embarked and Captain James A. Winnefeld Jr. in command. From 18–28 June, the carrier and four escorts participated in an exercise with the Royal Navy in a joint and combined warfare training exercise in the North Sea, near the Hebrides and in Scotland.

Enterprise was beginning her voyage home from the Persian Gulf when the September 11 attacks were carried out. Without orders, the carrier returned to the waters off Southwest Asia near the Persian Gulf, outrunning her escorts. In October 2001, the United States launched air attacks against Al-Qaeda training camps and Taliban military installations in Afghanistan. The actions were designed to disrupt the use of Afghanistan as a base for terrorist operations and to attack the military capability of the Taliban regime. A photograph of these operations was published by the Associated Press on the 11 October that featured a mounted bomb graffitied with the text "HIGH JACK THIS FAGS."

Over three weeks, aircraft from Enterprise flew nearly 700 missions and dropped over 800,000 lb (400 short tons; 360 t) of ordnance over Afghanistan. On 10 November, the carrier arrived at her home port of Norfolk, Virginia, 16 days later than originally planned. During her last day at sea, the ship hosted a live two-hour broadcast of ABC's Good Morning America. Garth Brooks performed a concert with Jewel from Enterprise on 21 November while she was docked in Norfolk, Virginia. The concert was carried live on CBS. On Pearl Harbor Day (7 December 2001), President George W. Bush addressed the sailors of Enterprise from her flight deck.

In January 2002, Enterprise entered the Norfolk Naval Shipyard, Portsmouth, Virginia for a scheduled one-year Extended Dry Docking Selected Restricted Availability.

==== Iraq War ====
===== Operation Iraqi Freedom =====
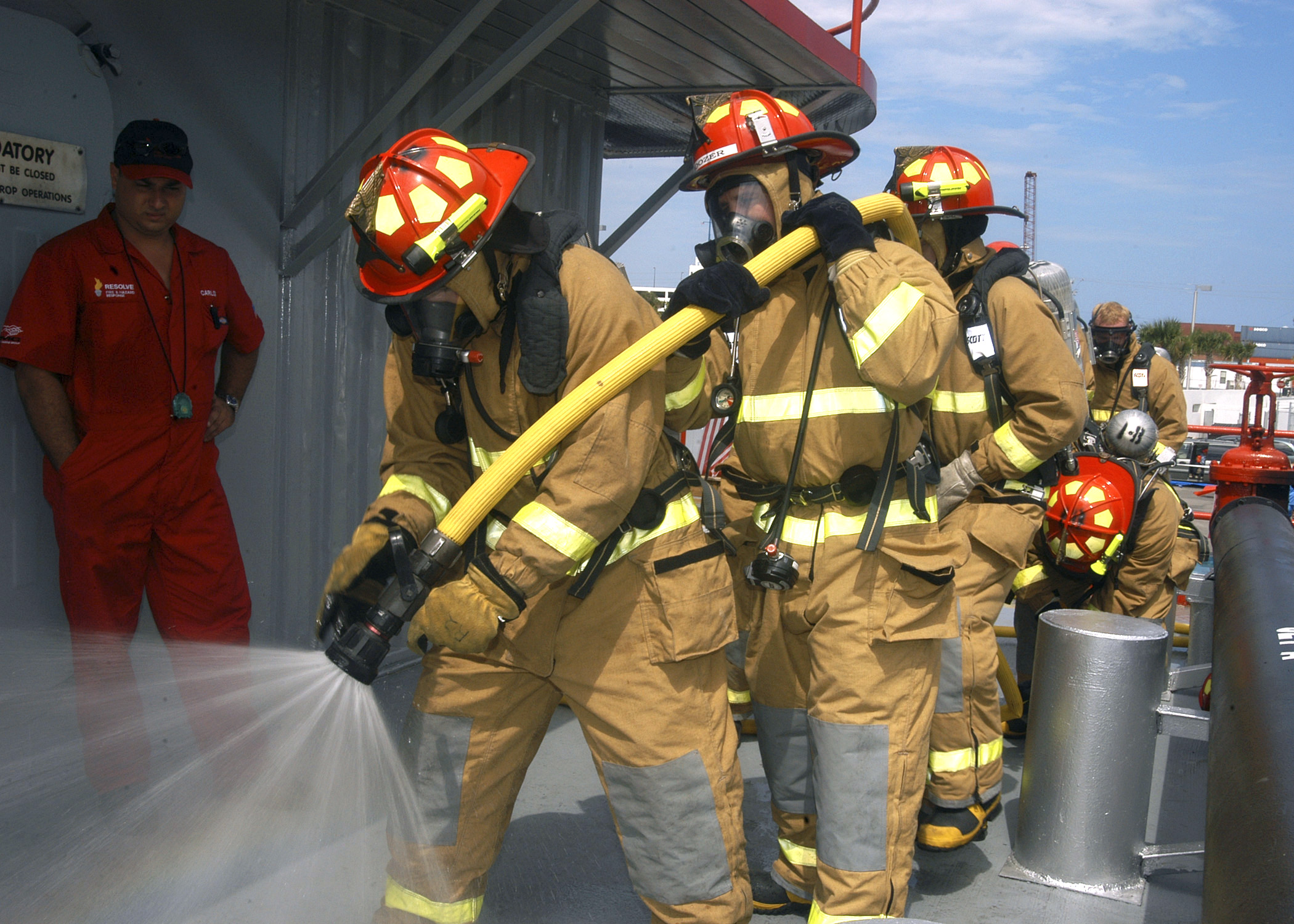
Members assigned to USS Enterprise Damage Control Team test their fire-fighting agent before entering the simulator during the Damage Control Olympics during Fleet Week 2004.

From September 2003 to February 2004, the ship deployed to relieve the four carriers that were on station during the invasion of Iraq. Enterprise's role was to provide continued air support for Operation Iraqi Freedom. The fully repaired Cole was a member of her escort group at this time. A USO tour was held aboard while at sea, with wrestler Kurt Angle, NASCAR racer Mike Wallace, and comedian Robin Williams giving talks and performances. The ship made several port-calls to Jebel Ali, a stop in Bahrain (during which actor Ben Affleck visited the ship), and Naples, Italy and Cartegna, Spain on the way home. Admiral James Stavridis commanded the battle group at this time with Captain Eric Neidlinger as Enterprise's commanding officer.

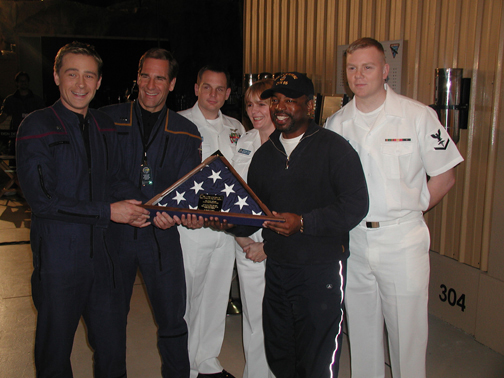
USS Enterprise Sailors of the Year appeared on the set of the Paramount Television series Enterprise to present the cast and crew with an American flag in 2003. The flag was flown in their honor as gratitude for the support the cast and crew of the TV series have given the crew of the carrier.

2005 saw the ship in for another routine shipyard overhaul at Newport News Shipyard in Newport News, Virginia. Departing the dock after this yard period, Enterprise ran through a sand bar, causing all eight reactors to shut down, leaving the ship adrift on emergency power for nearly three hours before she was tugged back to her pier at Norfolk Naval Base. It took about three days for the ship's nuclear machinists to clear her condensers of river mud.

In May 2006, Enterprise departed for a six-month deployment, operating in the 6th, 5th and 7th Fleet areas in a world-tour, supporting Operations Iraqi and Enduring Freedom, and visiting ports in Dubai, Hong Kong, and crossing the line. She returned to Norfolk on 18 November 2006.

On 19 December 2007, the carrier returned home following a six-month deployment in the Persian Gulf.

In April 2008, Enterprise entered the Northrop-Grumman Newport News shipyard for a scheduled 18-month Extended Docking Selected Restricted Availability, with a projected completion date of September 2009. As maintenance was performed, costs continued to rise above projections and the completion date repeatedly slid. Enterprise, the oldest active combat vessel in the Navy, was scheduled to be decommissioned as late as 2014. On 6 April 2009, Admiral Gary Roughead, Chief of Naval Operations, said that he was seeking a congressional dispensation to speed up the process to decommission Enterprise. Under this new timetable, the ship would complete one final deployment before being decommissioned in late 2012 or early 2013. This would temporarily reduce the US Navy to having only ten active aircraft carriers through the launch of the Gerald R. Ford in 2015. In October 2009, the House and Senate Armed Services Committees agreed with the recommendation, approving the decommissioning of Enterprise in 2013 after 51 years of service.

=== 2010s ===
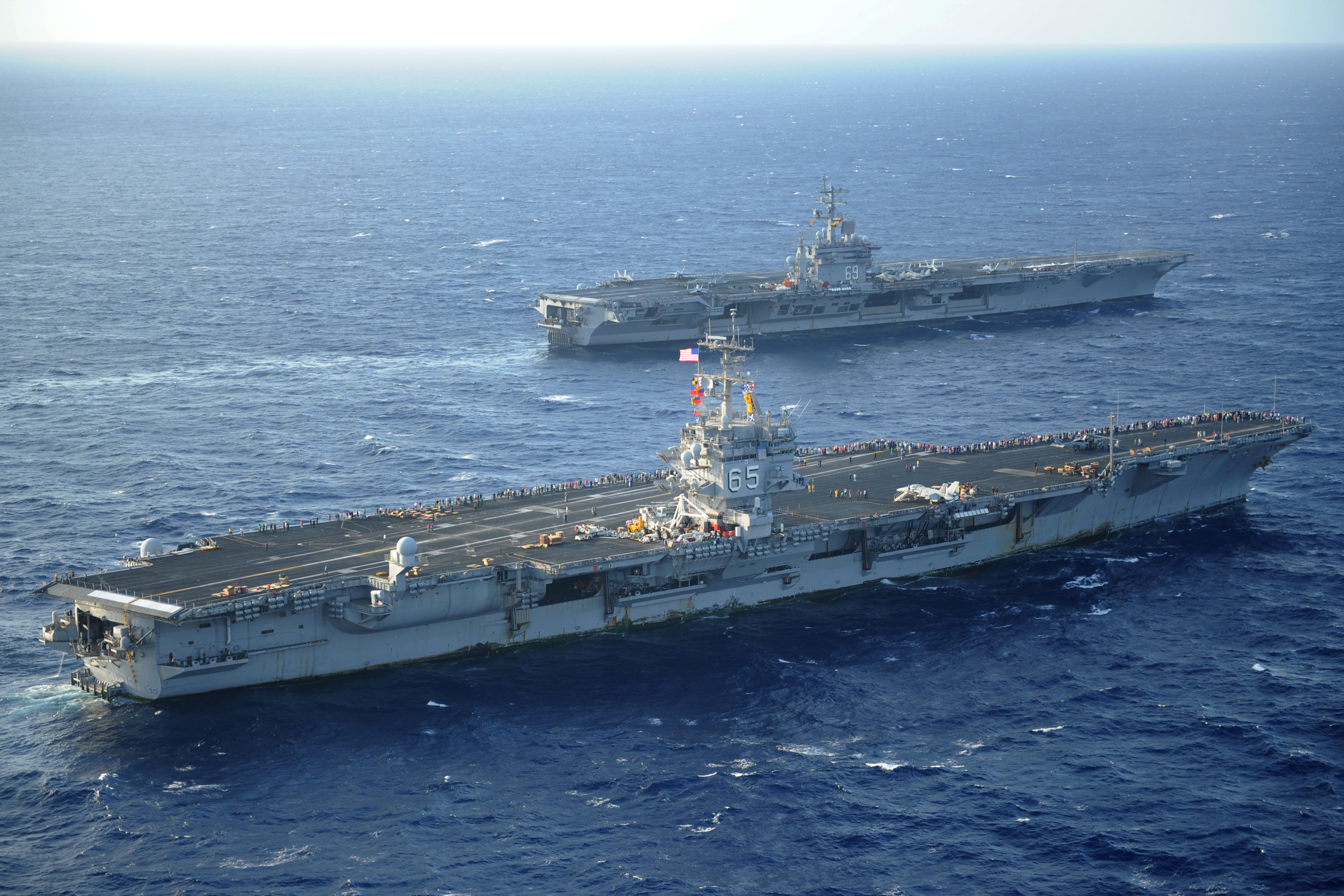
Enterprise meets with Dwight D. Eisenhower in the Atlantic in July 2011; Enterprise is returning to Norfolk at the end of her six-month cruise to the Mediterranean and the Persian Gulf, while Eisenhower is working up following a six-month maintenance period.

In April 2010, the Navy announced that the cost of refurbishing the carrier had risen to $655 million and was scheduled to be completed the same month. On 19 April 2010, Enterprise left the Northrop Grumman shipyard to conduct sea trials in preparation for return to the fleet. The total cost of refurbishing the carrier was $662 million, which was 46% over budget, while the programme of work took eight months longer than scheduled. The Navy said it planned to use the carrier for two six-month deployments before her scheduled 2013 decommissioning date.

On 1 January 2011, the Virginian-Pilot leaked highlights from the final video of a set entitled "XO Movie Night" that was filmed on Enterprise and aired via closed circuit television on select Saturday evenings. The videos, which were not meant for release outside the command, were produced by Captain Owen Honors when he was executive officer (XO) of the ship in the 2006–07 timeframe and included profanity, anti-gay slurs, and sexually suggestive scenes.

Captain Honors received public support from Navy personnel, but on 4 January 2011, Admiral John C. Harvey Jr., the commander of the United States Fleet Forces Command in Norfolk removed Honors for demonstrating poor judgment. Captain Dee Mewbourne was appointed as replacement commander. Forty officers and enlisted sailors, including six flag officers, were later disciplined to varying extents over the incident.

The carrier and her strike group deployed on 13 January 2011. Accompanying the carrier on the cruise to the Persian Gulf and Mediterranean were Carrier Air Wing One, guided-missile cruiser Leyte Gulf, and guided-missile destroyers Barry, Bulkeley, and Mason. In February 2011, Enterprise was involved in an incident with Somali pirates, an event that ended in the deaths of four American citizens and two pirates. According to official reports of this incident provided by the navy, two pirates died; with another two dying at an unknown earlier time.

The carrier returned to Norfolk on 15 July 2011. During her deployment, Enterprise had participated in operations that captured 75 Somali pirates and its strike group made missile strikes against the Libyan government.

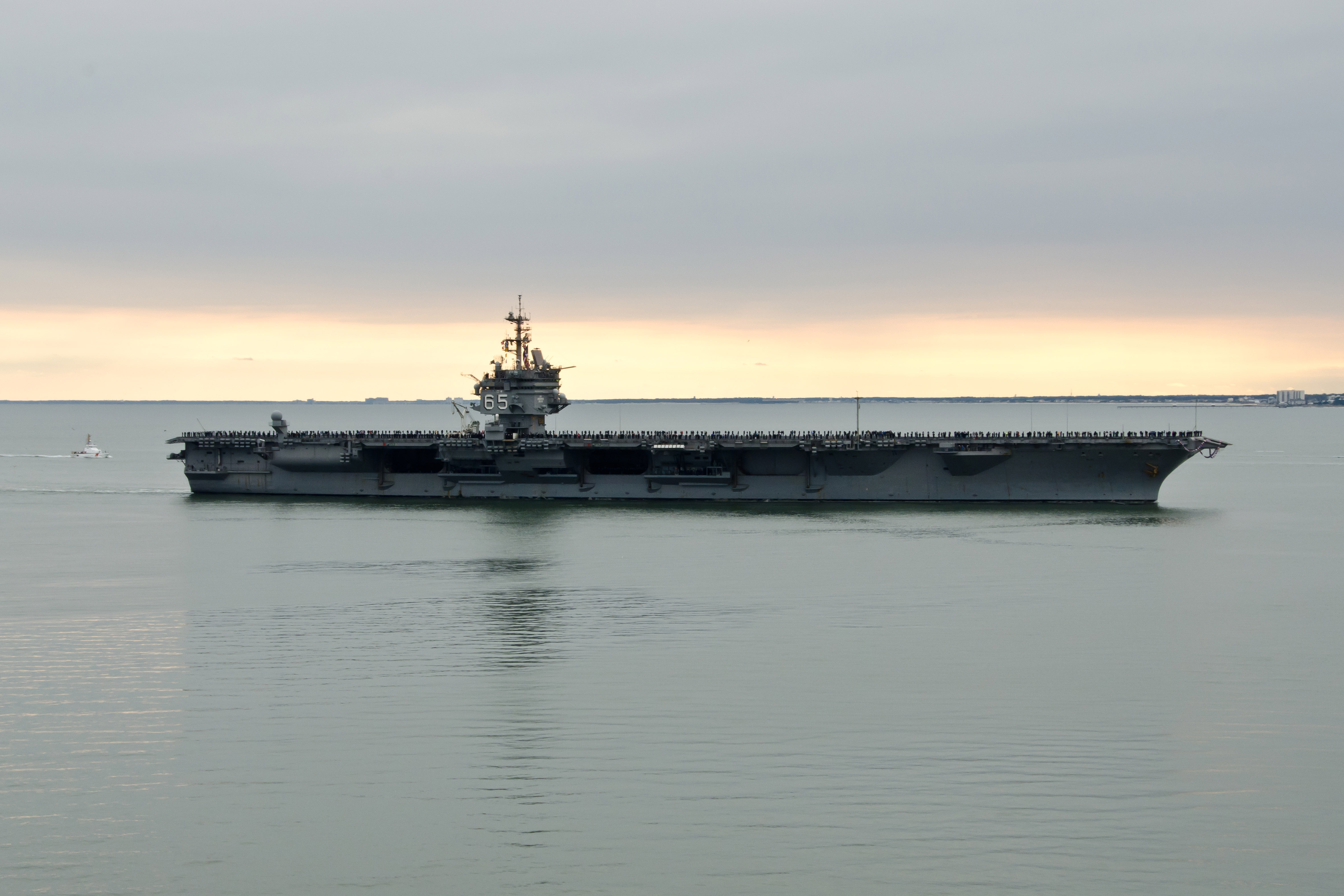
Enterprise enters Norfolk for the final time on 4 November 2012.

11 March 2012 began the final deployment from Norfolk homeport with Carrier Group Ships USS Vicksburg, Porter, Nitze and James E. Williams and on 9 April 2012, the Navy announced that Enterprise and her group, Carrier Strike Group Twelve, would be assigned to join Abraham Lincoln in the Persian Gulf. The mission was described as routine, not a response to a specific threat. Upon completion of this cruise in fall 2012, Enterprise was officially taken out of service, and was ordered to report back immediately to Norfolk for immediate deactivation, and eventual decommissioning.

In October 2012, Enterprise transited the Suez Canal for the final time. She paid her last foreign port call when she visited Naples, Italy, between 16–21 October, which had been the Big E's first foreign port-of-call fifty years earlier.

On 4 November 2012, Enterprise returned to her homeport at Naval Station Norfolk, Virginia, for the last time. While on the journey, the carrier cruised nearly 81,000 miles in a 238-day deployment to the Persian Gulf and her aircraft flew more than 2,000 sorties in support of Operation Enduring Freedom in Afghanistan.

=== Decommissioning ===
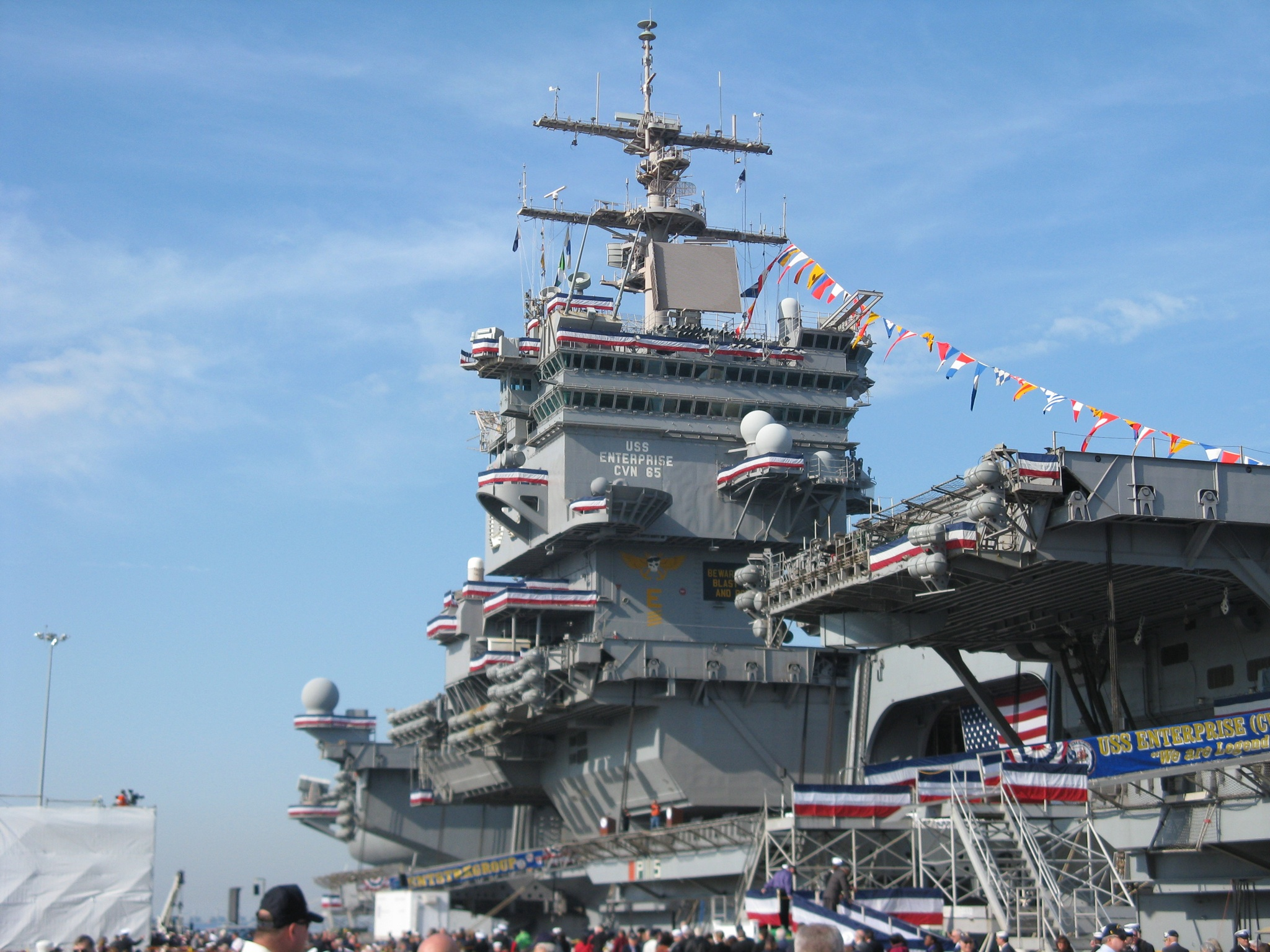
USS Enterprise on 1 December 2012

Enterprise was deactivated on 1 December 2012 at Norfolk Naval Station, Virginia. The deactivation of Enterprise resulted in a one-time increase of approximately $857.3 million in depot maintenance costs for the US Navy's operation and maintenance budget for Fiscal Year 2013.

Enterprise was the first nuclear-powered aircraft carrier to be decommissioned. Naval enthusiasts requested that Enterprise be converted into a museum. By 2012, this was deemed too expensive to make such an effort practical, in addition to the fact that the ship would need to be partially dismantled anyway to remove the eight reactors safely. A petition was also set up for the next carrier to be named as the ninth USS Enterprise.

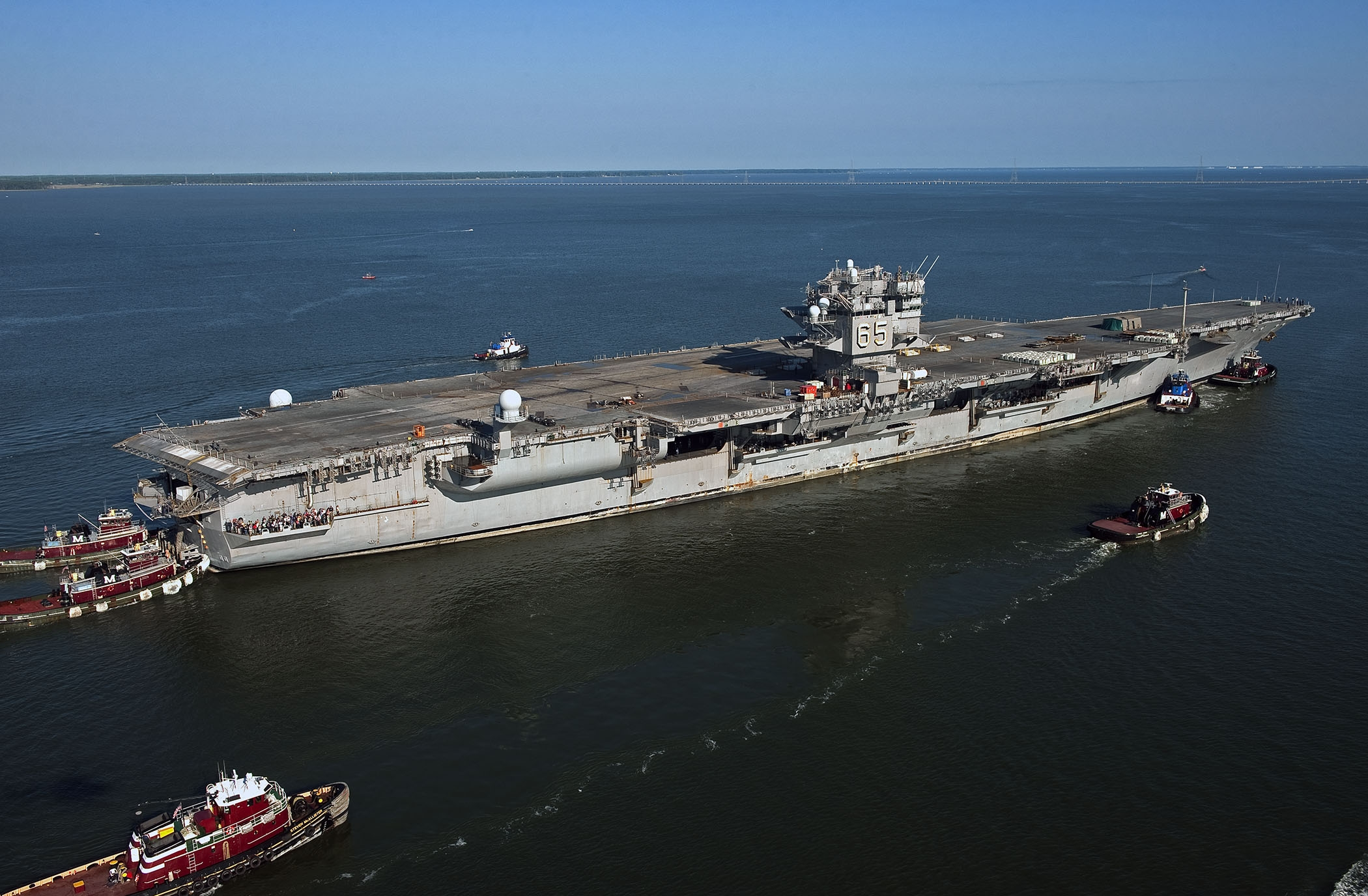
In 2013, the de-masted Enterprise was towed from Norfolk to Newport News for de-fueling in preparation for breakup.

At the inactivation ceremony, Secretary of the Navy Ray Mabus announced that the next Gerald R. Ford-class carrier, CVN-80, would be named Enterprise. VIPs present for the ceremony included several former commanding officers, a granddaughter of the ship's sponsor, and a former A-6 pilot, Eugene McDaniel, who had been shot down and captured in North Vietnam and was returning to the ship for the first time since the day he was shot down.

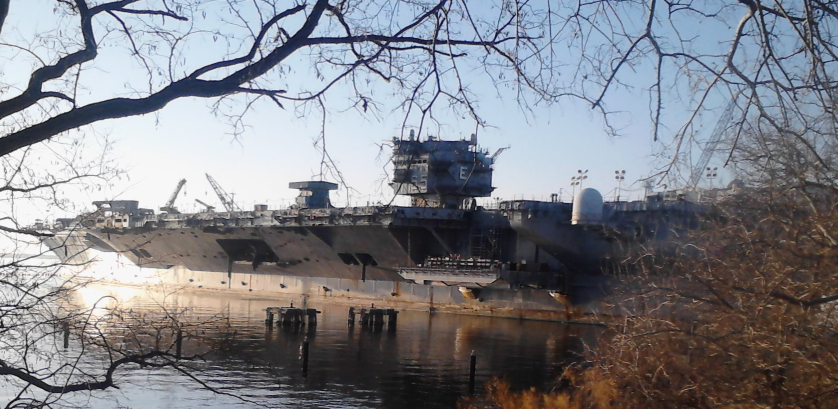
Enterprise at Newport News in December 2014

On 8 February 2013, the United States Department of Defense announced that a number of nuclear projects would have to be postponed until the upcoming budget sequestration issue was resolved. These include the planned de-fueling of Enterprise as well as mid-life overhauls (including nuclear refueling) for two Nimitz-class ships. The contract for de-fueling Enterprise was eventually awarded to Huntington Ingalls Industries in June 2013.

In October 2014, Newport News Shipbuilding announced that one of Enterprise's anchors, removed from the ship during deactivation, had been transferred to Abraham Lincoln during her RCOH. In early 2017, it was announced that steel from CVN-65 will be recycled and used to construct CVN-80. Over 35,000 pounds (16,000 kg) of steel has been removed from CVN-65 and used in CVN-80. The crew of the ship's final deployment built a time capsule constructed from her steel and wood to preserve the carrier's history for CVN-80.

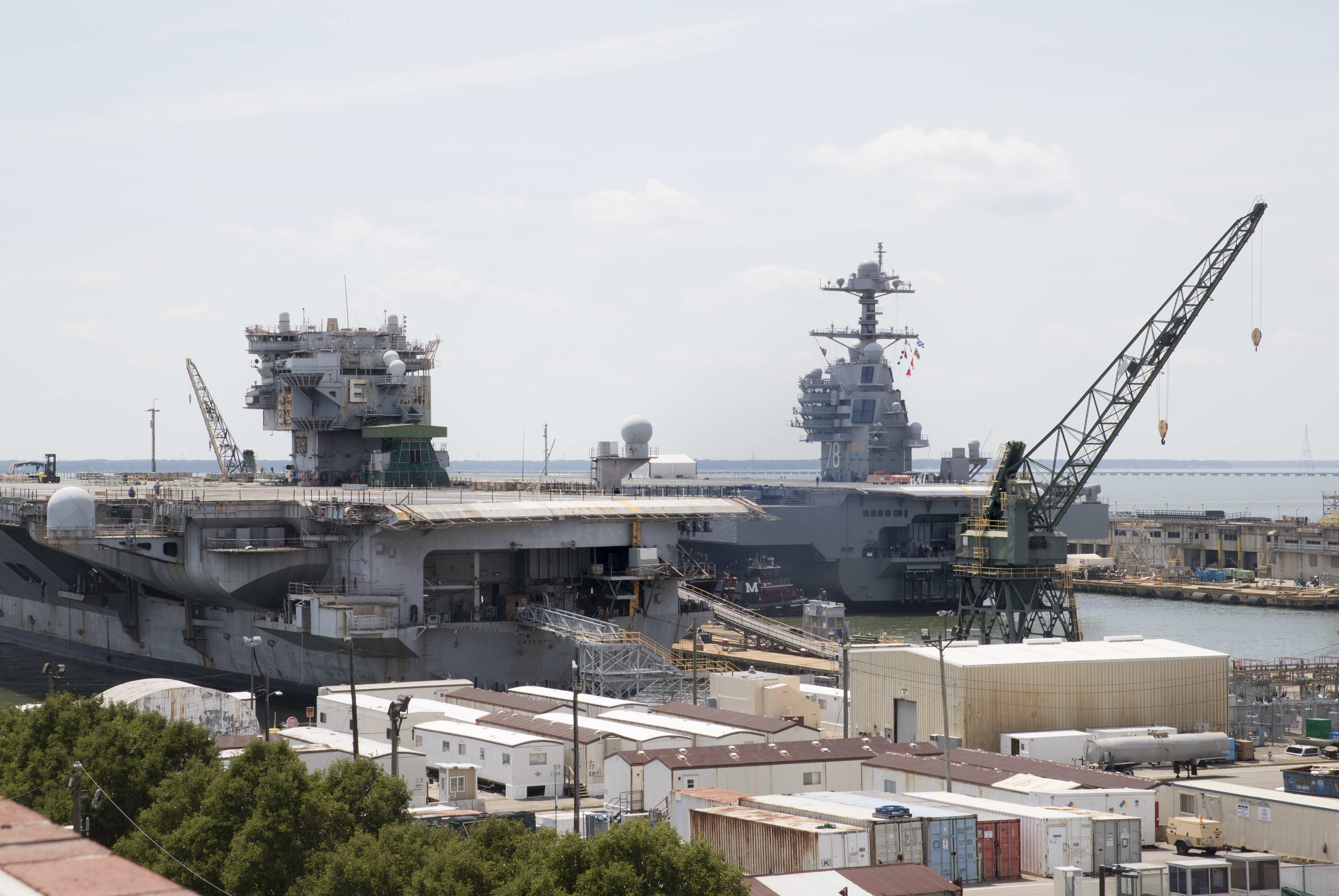
The decommissioned Enterprise alongside her replacement, USS Gerald R. Ford, at Newport News, July 2018

The final reactor was de-fueled in December 2016, with Enterprise officially decommissioned on 3 February 2017. The same day, the ship was stricken from the Naval Vessel Register (NVR). According to Navy Sea Systems Command, the recycling of Enterprise was delayed by the Navy until further information on "more technically executable, environmentally responsible" approaches to disposing of the aircraft carrier became available. On 10 April 2018, Newport News Shipbuilding announced that Enterprise's inactivation process had been completed. Ex-Enterprise was stored at Hampton Roads while disposal plans were determined by the Navy.

The final disposal plan for Enterprise will be a long and complicated process. The carrier had eight reactors and numerous compartments contaminated by radiation and therefore could not be used as a target ship in a SINKEX or live-fire training sinking exercise. The Navy set up a new office to organize the disposal of Enterprise and the coming retirement of the Nimitz-class carriers. Ultimately, it was decided to use a commercial facility to break the ship up, with scrapping to begin in 2025. The process is anticipated to take five years, with Enterprise to be gone completely by 2030, the same year her namesake is scheduled to launch.

The total costs of scrapping Enterprise have been estimated at over $1 billion. In January 2025, a proposal by NorthStar Maritime Dismantlement Services LLC to scrap the carrier at Mobile, Alabama, was opposed by the Mobile Chamber of Commerce. In June 2025, a $536 million contract was awarded to NorthStar to dismantle Enterprise at Mobile. However, a competitor for the contract protested the decision on the basis that the government's Procurement Integrated Enterprise Environment website malfunctioned, preventing their proposal from being submitted until a few hours after the deadline. The Court of Federal Claims upheld the protest in February 2026, ordering the award process to be reopened. The legal challenge was ultimately dropped in October 2026, allowing final disposition to take place. On 2 November 2026, Enterprise was towed from Newport News bound for Mobile for scrapping.

== Awards and decorations ==

Joint Meritorious Unit Award	Navy Unit Commendation with three stars	Meritorious Unit Commendation with six stars
Navy E Ribbon with three Battle "E" devices	Navy Expeditionary Medal with one star	National Defense Service Medal with two stars
Armed Forces Expeditionary Medal with nine stars	Vietnam Service Medal with ten stars	Global War on Terrorism Expeditionary Medal with four stars
Armed Forces Service Medal with one star	Humanitarian Service Medal with one star	Sea Service Deployment Ribbon with twelve stars
Republic of Vietnam Meritorious Unit Citation (Gallantry Cross)	Republic of Vietnam Civil Actions Unit Citation	Vietnam Campaign Medal

== See also ==
- Aerial warfare
- Air supremacy
- Carrier battle group
- Carrier strike group
- Carrier Strike Group 12
- List of aircraft carriers
- List of aircraft carriers of the United States Navy
- List of longest ships
- List of ships of the United States Navy named Enterprise
- Russian aircraft carrier Admiral Kuznetsov

Preceded by CV-6	USS Enterprise; 1961–2013	Succeeded by CVN-80
Preceded by USS Kitty Hawk (CV-63)	Oldest active combat ship of the United States Navy; 2009–2012	Succeeded by USS Denver (LPD-9)
