= Italian ship Enrico Dandolo =

Enrico Dandolo or simply Dandolo was the name of at least three ships of the Italian Navy named in honour of Enrico Dandolo and may refer to:

- Italian ironclad Enrico Dandolo was an ironclad warship launched in 1878 and stricken in 1920.
- Italian submarine Dandolo, a Marcello-class submarine launched in 1937 and discarded in 1947.
- Italian cruiser Enrico Dandolo, an unbuilt Andrea Doria-class cruiser
- Italian submarine Enrico Dandolo (S513), a Toti-class submarine launched in 1967 and decommissioned in 1993.
