= Italian cruiser Caio Duilio =

1962 Andrea Doria-class cruiser

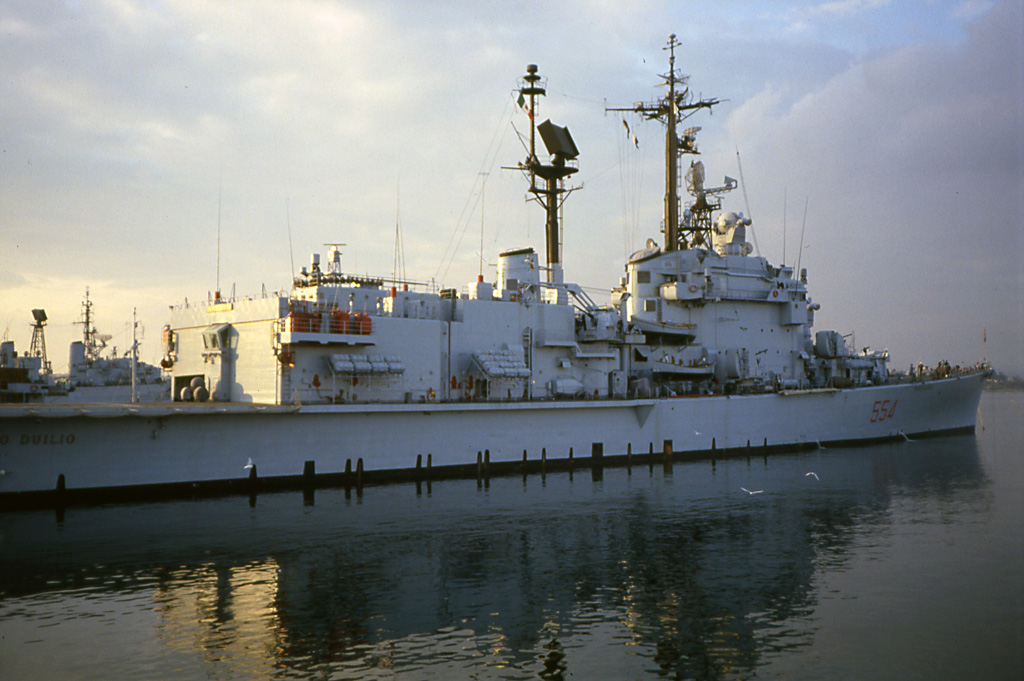
- Caio Duilio after conversion into a training cruiser

History

Italy
- Name: Caio Duilio
- Namesake: Gaius Duilius
- Builder: Navalmeccanica, Castellammare di Stabia
- Laid down: 16 May 1958
- Launched: 22 December 1962
- Commissioned: 30 November 1964
- Decommissioned: 15 November 1989
- Stricken: 19 July 1991
- Fate: Sold for scrap 31 December 1992

General characteristics
- Class & type: Andrea Doria-class cruiser
- Displacement: 6,500 long tons (6,604 t)
- Length: 144.0 m (472 ft 5 in) pp; 149.2 m (489 ft 6 in) overall
- Beam: 17.3 m (56 ft 9 in)
- Draught: 5.0 m (16 ft 5 in)
- Propulsion: Steam turbines, 4 boilers, 2 shafts, 60,000 shp (45 MW)
- Speed: 30 knots (56 km/h; 35 mph)
- Range: 5,000 nmi (9,300 km) at 7 kn (13 km/h; 8.1 mph)
- Complement: 485
- Sensors & processing systems: 1× SPS-12 air search radar; 1× SPS-39 3D air search radar; 1× SPQ-2 air/surface search radar; 2× SPG-55 missile fire control radar; 4× RTN 10X gun fire control radar; SQS-39 sonar
- Armament: 1 × twin rail Terrier SAM (40 missiles); 8 × 76mm/L62 Allargato AA guns; 6 × 12.75 in (324 mm) torpedo tubes
- Aircraft carried: 4 helicopters

Caio Duilio (C 554) was an Andrea Doria-class helicopter cruiser of the Marina Militare. Built by Navalmeccanica at Castellammare di Stabia, it was named after the Roman consul Gaius Duilius.

== Design ==
The Andrea Doria class was intended to provide long range anti-aircraft and anti submarine protection, and as such was armed with a single Mark 10 twin rail launcher for the American Terrier surface-to-air missile forward and a large helicopter deck and hangar at the aft end of the ship. It was planned to carry three Sea King helicopters, but these proved too large for the ship, and four Agusta-Bell AB-212 helicopters were carried instead.

Close-in anti-aircraft protection was provided by eight 76mm/L62 Allargato rapid fire guns mounted on pedestals around the ship's superstructure, while two sets of triple torpedo tubes for lightweight anti-submarine torpedoes provided short range anti-submarine armament.

== History ==
The ship was laid down on 16 May 1958, was launched on 22 December 1962, and commissioned on 30 November 1964.

The ship was assigned to the 2° Gruppo Navale d’Altura (2nd High Seas Naval Group) of the II Divisione Navale (2nd Naval Division), based in Taranto. In the 1980s she was transferred to La Spezia, while her sister, Andrea Doria, moved from there to Taranto.

During the late 1970s, Caio Duilio was upgraded to carry the improved SM-1ER Standard missile, with improved radars and sonar also being fitted.

In 1979–1980, Caio Duilio was converted to a training cruiser to replace the old Capitani Romani-class cruiser San Giorgio. The ship's original hangar was turned into classrooms and additional accommodation, with a new, smaller, hangar being built on the forward part on the helicopter deck, reducing the ship's aviation capacity to two helicopters. The aft two 76 mm guns were also removed, together with their associated fire control radars.

Caio Duilio was decommissioned on 15 December 1989, stricken on 19 July 1991 and sold for scrap on 31 December 1992.
