= USS Gyatt =

US Navy destroyer (1945–1968)

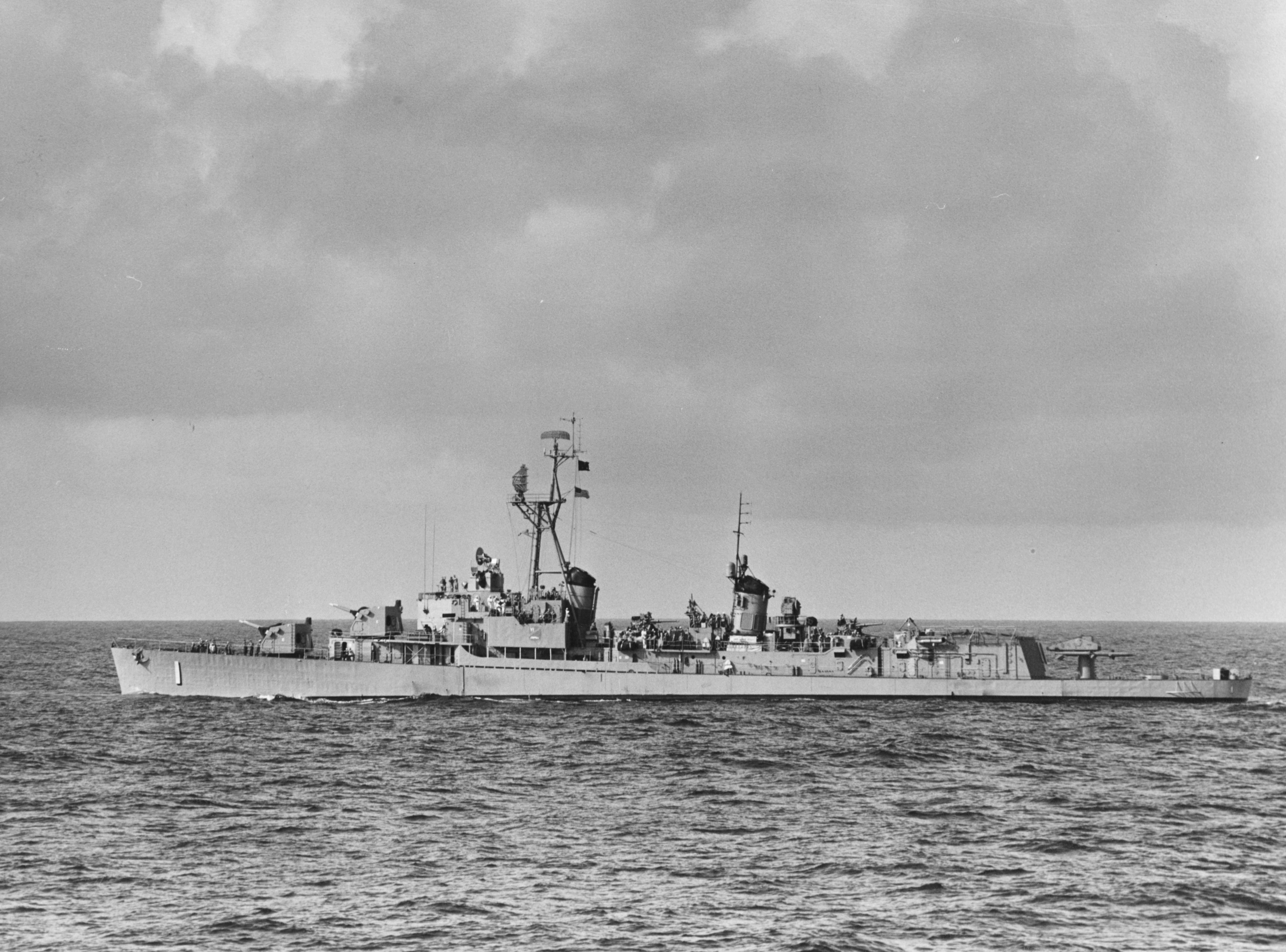
- Gyatt as DDG-1, with her novel missile system aft

History

United States
- Name: USS Gyatt
- Namesake: Edward Earl Gyatt
- Builder: Federal Shipbuilding and Drydock Company, Kearny, New Jersey
- Laid down: 7 September 1944
- Launched: 15 April 1945
- Commissioned: 2 July 1945
- Decommissioned: 22 October 1969
- Reclassified: DDG-712, 1 December 1956; DDG-1, 23 May 1957; DD-712, 1 October 1962
- Stricken: 22 October 1969
- Fate: Sunk as a target, 11 June 1970

General characteristics
- Class & type: Gearing-class destroyer
- Displacement: 2,425 long tons (2,464 t)
- Length: 390 ft 6 in (119.02 m)
- Beam: 41 ft 4 in (12.60 m)
- Draft: 14 ft 6 in (4.42 m)
- Installed power: 60,000 shp (45,000 kW)
- Propulsion: 4 × Babcock & Wilcox steam boilers; 2 × propellers
- Speed: 34.6 knots (64.1 km/h; 39.8 mph)
- Range: 4,500 mi (7,200 km)
- Complement: 345
- Armament: 3 × twin 5"/38 (12.7 cm) dual purpose guns; 16 × 40 mm Bofors; 20 × 20 mm Oerlikons; 1 × quintuple 21-inch (53.3 cm) torpedo tubes; 6 × depth charge projectors; 2 × depth charge tracks

General characteristics (1956 rebuild)
- Complement: 296
- Sensors & processing systems: MK 72 fire control system; MK 25 gun director; AN/SPS-49 air search radar
- Armament: 2 × twin 5"/38 (12.7 cm) dual purpose guns; 2 × twin 3"/50 (7.6 cm) AA guns; 1 × twin arm Terrier AA missile launcher (Removed 1962); 2 × triple 12.75 in (32 cm) anti-submarine torpedo tubes; 2 × depth charge projectors

USS Gyatt (DD-712/DDG-1/DDG-712) (Note: Pronounced /ɡaɪɑːt/) was a Gearing-class destroyer of the United States Navy operated between 1945 and 1968. The ship was named for Edward Gyatt, a United States Marine Corps private and Marine Raider killed during the Battle of Guadalcanal. She was laid down in 1944, commissioned in 1945, and missed combat during the Second World War. In 1955, she was converted into the world's first guided missile destroyer (DDG) to evaluate the RIM-2 Terrier surface-to-air missile and the practicality of similar weapons.

Her service contributed to the development of dedicated air-defense missile escorts and of later anti-air missiles by identifying flaws in both designs. Her goal was completed in 1962, and she was converted into a floating test bed for radars and other electronic equipment. By 1969, structural issues caused by missile launches forced her to be decommissioned; she was sunk as a target in 1970.

== Namesake ==
Edward Earl Gyatt was born on 4 September 1921, in Syracuse, New York, and later enlisted in the United States Marine Corps in 1942. Private Gyatt served with the 1st Marine Raider Battalion during the Battle of Tulagi, part of the initial landings of the Guadalcanal campaign. He went ashore on Tulagi on 7 August 1942, and communicated that a Japanese counterattack was approaching his position that night. He remained at his station and caused heavy casualties to the Japanese forces before he was killed by a hand grenade. Gyatt was awarded the Silver Star posthumously for his actions. The first ship named after the private was DE-550, a John C. Butler-class destroyer escort that was canceled before construction began.

== Design and construction ==
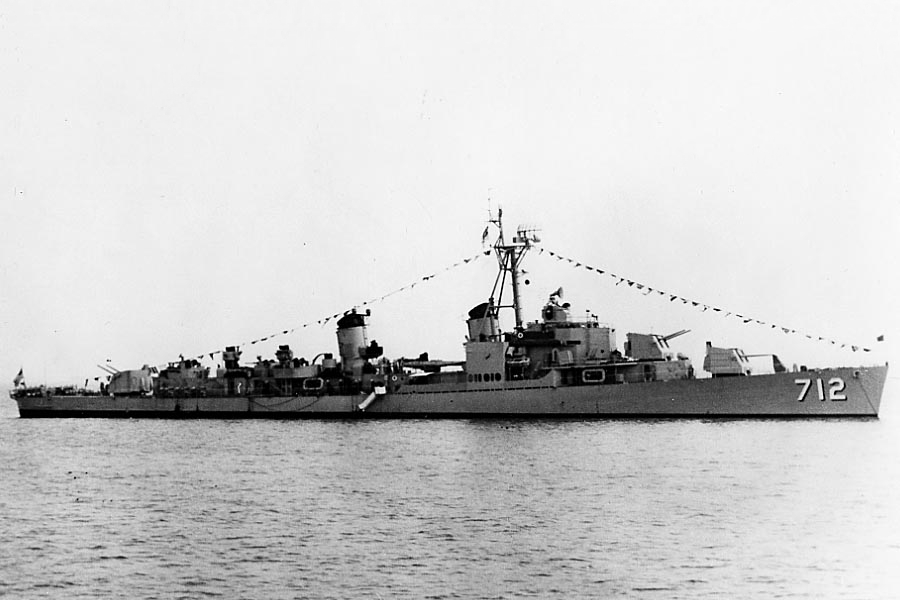
Gyatt in her World War II-era configuration, similar to her sister ships

=== Development ===
During World War II, the Fletcher-class destroyers were the main destroyers operated by the US Navy. Yet by 1943, the force had already identified methods to improve the design based on combat experience and further study. To maintain mass-production, a vast majority of the old design was retained aside from several details. The most obvious change was the consolidation of the main battery from five single 5 in (13 cm) gun turrets to three twin dual mounted turrets, thereby adding one gun barrel with half the turrets, which freed up immense space on and below deck. This design entered service as the Allen M. Sumner-class. Towards the last stages of the Pacific War, destroyers were faced with increasingly distant voyages and faster ships in need of escorting. To rectify this, the Sumner-class design was lengthened by 14 feet (4.3 m) to add greater range and cruising speed. The resulting design became the Gearing-class, (Note: For this reason, the design is also referred to as a long-hull Sumner-class destroyer.) the most advanced US destroyer class of the war.

=== Design ===
The Sumner and Gearing-classes were the most heavily armed US destroyers of the war. Her main weapons were the aforementioned three twin 5"/38 (Note: US Navy guns are designated by the caliber and the ratio of the caliber to the barrel's length. The 38 indicates the barrel was 38 times longer than the bore.) dual purpose guns, which allowed her to engage air, land, or sea targets at an average of 15 rounds a minute per barrel. While it was planned that she would have carried two quintuple 21-inch torpedo tube mounts, one was removed to make room for more anti-air guns. Due to the constant threat of enemy aircraft and Kamikazes, her nominal anti-air battery was enlarged to include sixteen Bofors 40mm guns in quad and twin mounts and an additional twenty 20 mm Oerlikon guns on dual ad-hoc mounts. To engage submarines, she was also fitted with two depth charge tracks and six depth charge projectors.

==== Characteristics ====
She had an overall length of 390.5 feet (119.0 m), a beam of 41.6 feet (12.7 m), and a draft of 14 feet (4.3 m), giving her a displacement of 2,425 tons and a fully loaded displacement at 3,479 tons. Four Babcock & Wilcox steam boilers produced 60,000 shaft horsepower (45,000 kilowatts) and a top speed of 34.6 knots (64.1 km/h; 39.8 mph) through two propellers. Her extended hull allowed her to carry 160 more tons of fuel than Sumner-class ships, increasing her cruising range by 30% to approximately 4,500 miles (7,200 km). Most ships of her class were manned by a crew of 345. She was laid down at the Federal Shipbuilding yard in Kearny, New Jersey, on 7 September 1944. She was launched on 15 April 1945 and commissioned on 2 July of the same year by the namesake's mother.

== Service history ==
=== Early history ===
Following a shakedown cruise in the Caribbean, Gyatt was stationed in Norfolk, Virginia, where she conducted patrols along the East Coast. She also participated in training exercises in the Gulf of Mexico and Caribbean, visiting several South American ports to demonstrate American naval presence. In 1946, she was reassigned to the 6th Fleet in the Mediterranean, where she regularly operated in the region and the North Atlantic for the next several years.

=== Guided missile destroyer ===
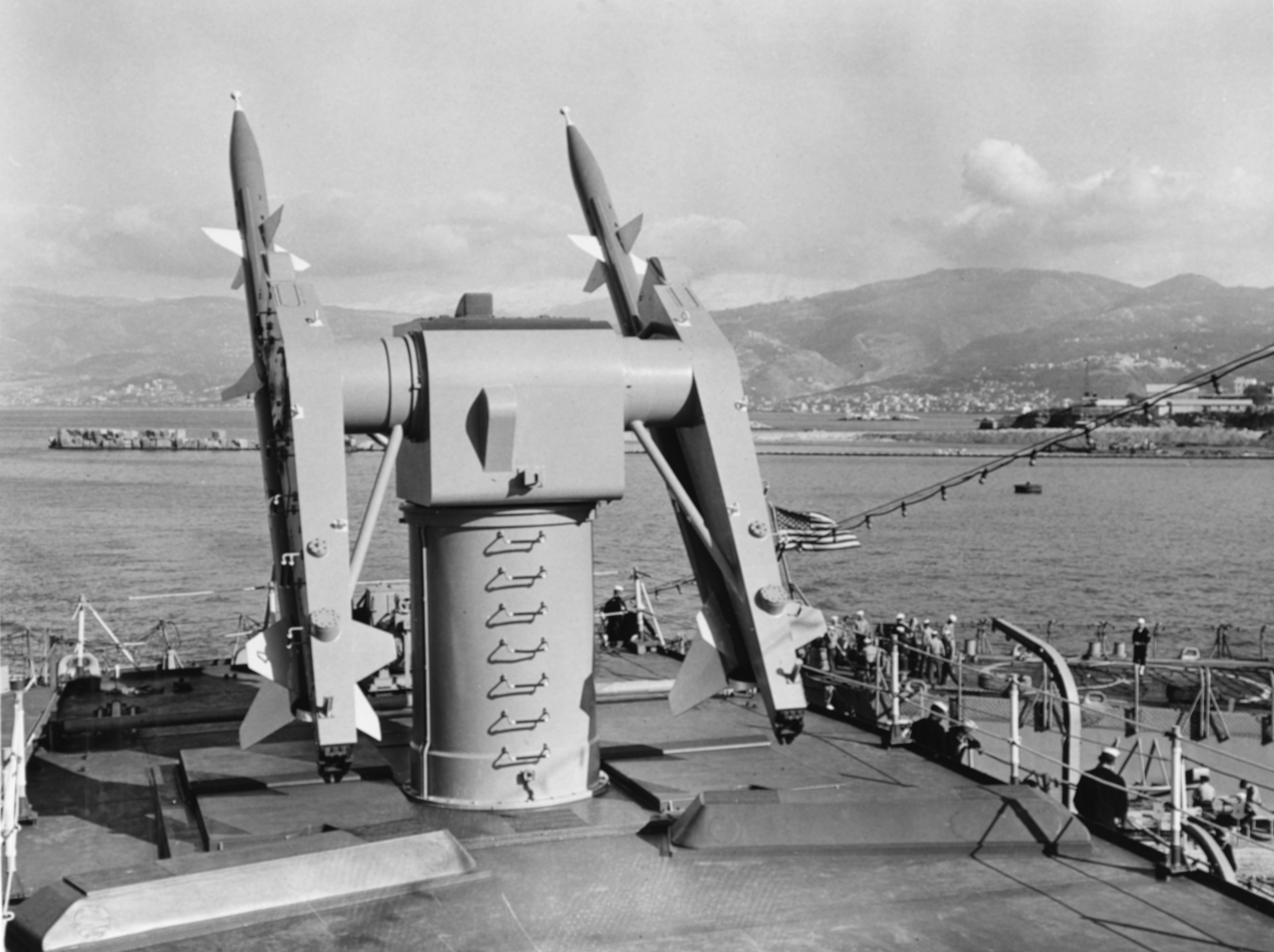
A twin RIM-2 launcher, similar to the one mounted on Gyatt

External videos
- Video depicting a similar reload process with the RIM-8 Talos missile instead of the Terrier
- https://www.youtube.com/watch?v=5qOpQeZbO-o

Since World War II, the primary role of destroyers and screening ships in a carrier fleet had been to provide air defense. Following this doctrine, the US Navy began developing new escort ships in the early 1950s, equipping them with advanced surface-to-air missile systems that promised greater effectiveness than older weapons. However, many of these new weapons, such as the RIM-2 Terrier, were still unproven for use on small destroyers. Gyatt was chosen to be fitted with a Terrier battery as a proof-of-concept for the weapon as they were slated for use on the upcoming Farragut-class destroyers. A weakness of early American guided missiles was a slow reaction time and difficulty engaging multiple targets, leaving ships susceptible to simultaneous attacks. It was hoped that having numerous small destroyers would mitigate the flaws, allowing a large number of Terriers to protect a carrier.

==== Terrier System ====
For her new role, Gyatt entered the Boston Naval Shipyard on 26 September 1955, and was decommissioned on 31 October for conversion into the world's first guided missile destroyer (DDG). Her entire aft – including a twin 5"/38 gun and parts of the superstructure and upper deck – were removed. In their place was the Terrier launcher and a 14-missile magazine.

To fire, the launcher would align itself along the centerline and with the magazine deckhouse. Inside was two cylindrical magazines that rotated the next missile into place, which allowed a loading arm to move each missile onto a rail and push it through a blast door and onto the launcher, achieving a reload speed of 2 missiles a minute. (Note: The entire mechanism is known as the Terrier MK 8 Launching System.) While the magazine took up the entire width of the ship, there was only space for 7 missiles per each arm of the launcher, greatly limiting Gyatt's practicality in any engagement. Missiles of the era were powerful and sensitive, and there was major concern regarding an accidental detonation inside the exposed magazine. To mitigate the threat, it was fitted with blowout ducts and pipes while the inside was air-conditioned. With each launch also producing temperatures up to 3,000 °F (1,650 °C), the superstructure and deck was also reinforced with Special Treatment Steel to absorb the loads.

To manage the weapon, she was fitted a variation of the Mark 37 Gun Fire Control System. (Note: Her gun director was modified to track two missiles simultaneously and to be better interconnected with the rest of the fire control system than her sisterships. It was designated as the MK 72.) To identify incoming aircraft, she was the first ship in the Navy to be mounted with the AN/SPS-49 search radar. Once a target was identified, her MK 25 gun director would track the target with a radar beam, allowing a launched Terrier to home in on the aircraft. She was armed to fire the RIM-2A and RIM-2B Terriers, initial and immature models of the weapon that had a range of about 10 miles (16 km), a flight ceiling of 40,000 feet (12,000 m), and a top speed of Mach 2.

To keep the destroyer stable during missile launches, she was equipped with the Navy's first stabilizer fins. The system consisted of two 45 square foot (4m^{2}) retractable fins that extended out from midship below the waterline that mitigated the pitching and rolling produced by each launch. To compensate for the weight of the new systems, her remaining two Bofors were swapped with twin 3"/50 caliber guns and her torpedo tubes were removed. In addition, the Navy wanted Gyatt and other anti-air escorts to be able to engage threats aside from aircraft. During the refit, she was also equipped with the most modern anti-submarine weapon suite available, which consisted of two MK 32 triple torpedo tubes and two Hedgehog depth charge projectors. Once refurbishment was complete, she was recommissioned in December 1956 and assigned the hull number DDG-712 as a guided missile destroyer.

==== Weapon experimentation ====
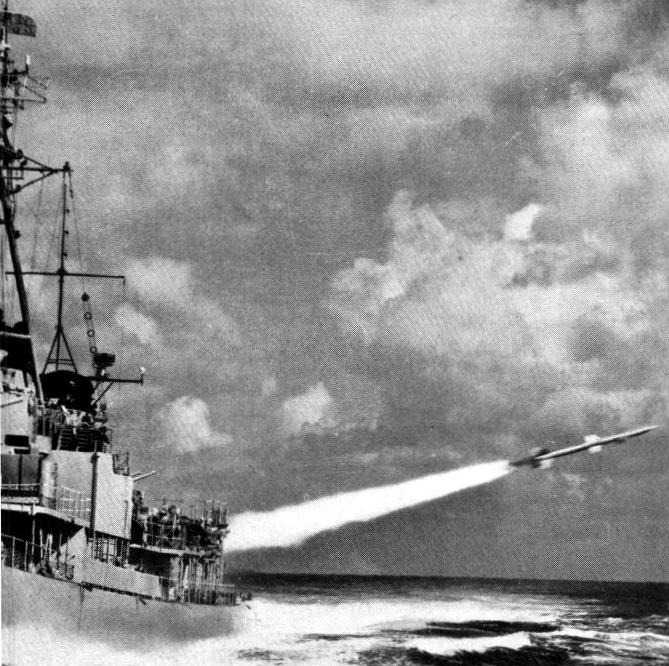
Gyatt launching a RIM-2 Terrier in 1957

For the next three years, she was evaluated on various sailings along the Atlantic coast. In recognition of her novel position, her hull number was altered to DDG-1, signifying her as the first guided missile destroyer. She then sailed to join the 6th Fleet on January 28, 1960, and became the first DDG to deploy overseas. On August 31, having arrived back at her new home port, Gyatt had trained with fleets throughout the Mediterranean. Upon her return, she joined the United States' space program. For several days in 1960 and 1961, she was stationed to recover nose-cones that fell to Earth from Project Mercury launches. As the Berlin Crisis inflamed Cold War tensions, she then joined the 6th Fleet in the Mediterranean to serve as an American counterbalance. After her return home, she operated out of Charleston, South Carolina.

==== Legacy ====
Her main contributions during the decade was her use as a missile testbed. The ship's various trainings demonstrated the Terrier's application onboard escorts, which saw the system adopted to the Navy's rapidly growing fleet of air-defense destroyer leaders. However, the battery proved to be too large for Gyatt's small hull, as immense strain was placed on her electrical grid, little room was left for other systems or modifications, and the design was overly complicated. The experience dissuaded further efforts to convert destroyers into air-defense missile ships, and the Navy instead opted to convert the rest of her class into modernized anti-submarine escorts as part of the Fleet Rehabilitation and Modernization (FRAM) program. Her weapon tests also demonstrated the need for a smaller surface-to-air missile system, informing the development of the more compact RIM-24 Tartar, which was fitted on the next generation of guided missile destroyers. Issues regarding the Terrier were largely rectified with the larger Farragut-class destroyers as they were the first ships in the Navy built from the keel-up to provide missile-based air defense. With lessons in mind from Gyatt, the new ships displaced twice as much and carried two launchers and nearly three times as many missiles than her in better protected magazines. In the modern age, all destroyers are fitted with at least one kind of guided missile, especially in relation to air defense.

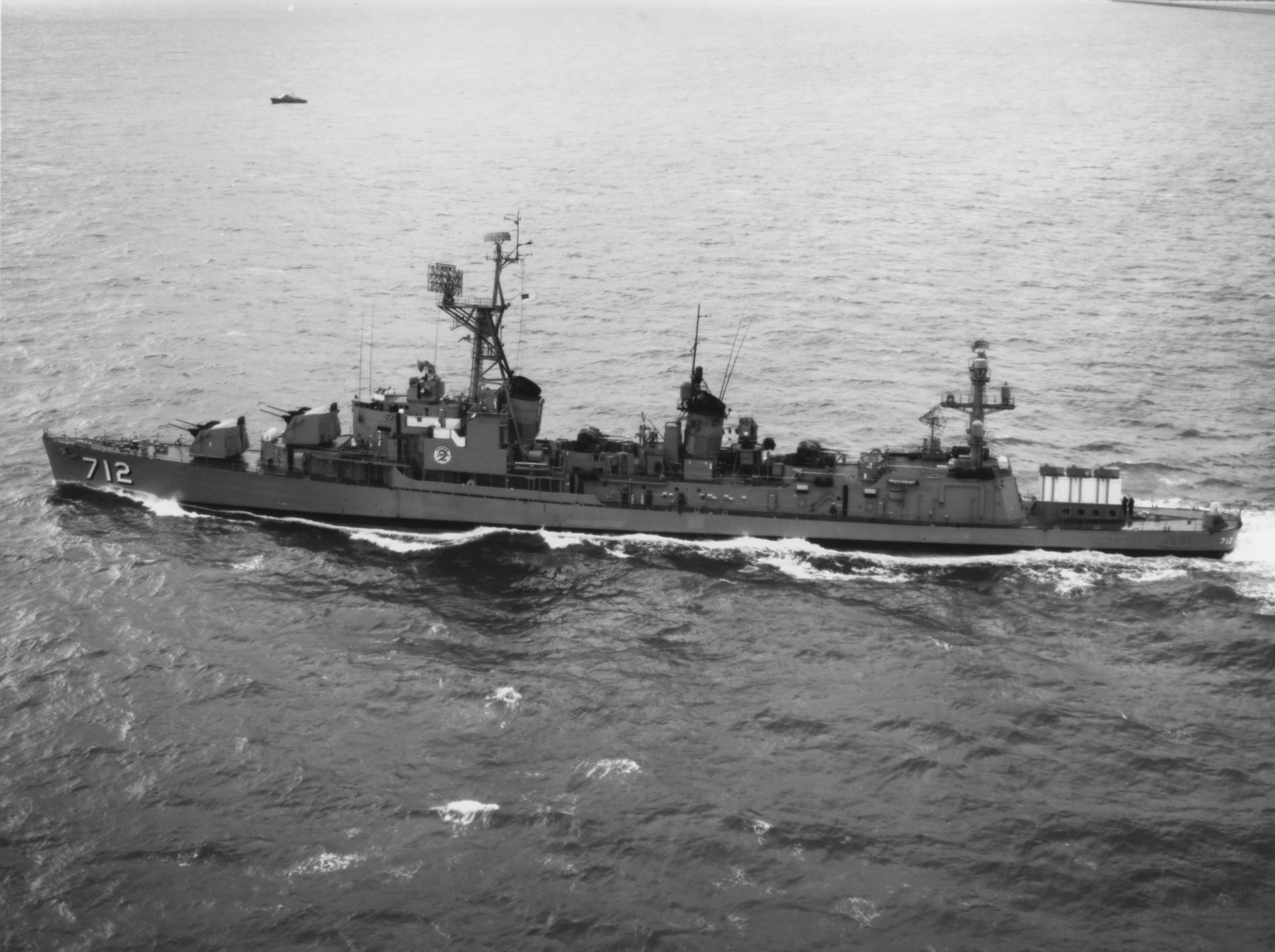
Gyatt in 1966, fitted with an aft mast and a wide assortment of experimental radars and antennas

=== Radar test ship ===
With her original goal fulfilled, she was retrofitted for service with the Operational Test and Evaluation Force in 1962. On 29 June, she entered the Charleston Naval Shipyard to have her Terriers removed and a mast fitted on top of the old missile magazine. The purpose of the new mast was to carry electronics and other experimental equipment so they could be tested at sea. Now designated as a radar test ship, her hull number was reverted to DD-712. On 1 January 1963, she reported to Norfolk and operated with the Naval Electronics Facility and tested new technology, primarily radars and sensors, along the US East Coast and Caribbean.

=== Sinking ===
By the late 1960s, her hull began to crack from stress caused by the missile launches. As it was cheaper to prematurely dispose of her than fix the hull, she was transferred to the reserve fleet and homeported to Washington, D.C. in 1968. She was stricken from the Naval Vessel Register on 22 October 1969, and sunk as a target off Virginia on 11 June 1970.

== See also ==
- Arleigh Burke-class destroyer Flight III, series of modern American guided missile destroyers built for air defense
- Ticonderoga-class cruiser, modern American air-defense ships
- USS Timmerman, Sarsfield, Richard E. Kraus, and Witek, experimental Gearing-class destroyers
