= USS Boston (CA-69) =

US Navy guided missile cruiser

Coordinates: 42.3718110°N 71.0544701°W

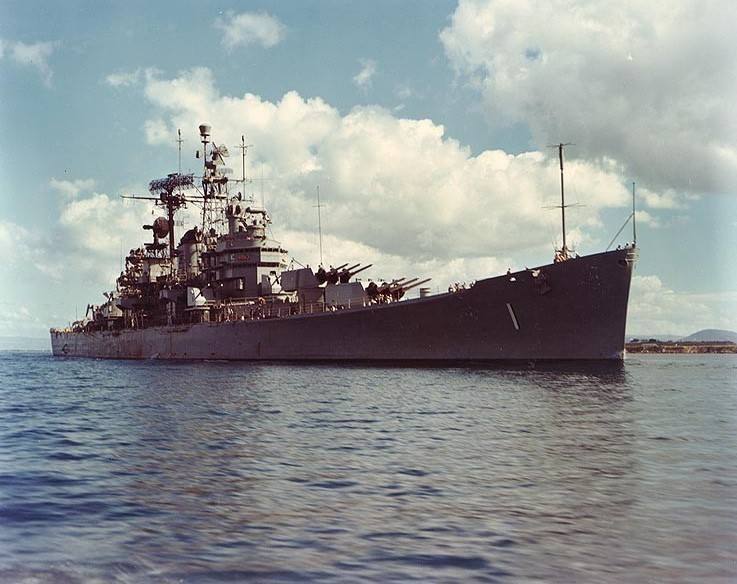
- USS Boston underway in Guantanamo Bay on 10 January 1967

History

United States
- Name: Boston
- Namesake: Boston
- Builder: Bethlehem Shipbuilding Corporation
- Laid down: 30 June 1941
- Launched: 26 August 1942
- Sponsored by: Mrs. Helen Noonan Tobin
- Commissioned: 30 June 1943
- Decommissioned: 29 October 1946
- Recommissioned: 1 November 1955
- Decommissioned: 5 May 1970
- Reclassified: CAG-1, 4 January 1952; CA-69, 1 May 1968
- Stricken: 4 January 1974
- Identification: Callsign: NAWP; Hull number: CA-69
- Honors and awards: See Awards
- Fate: Scrapped, 28 March 1975
- Notes: Bell is at Charlestown Navy Yard
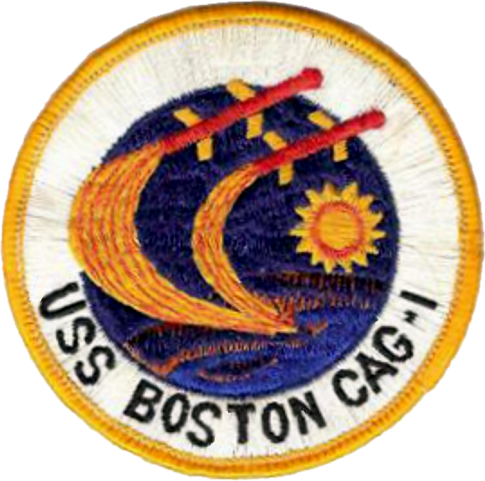
- Badge

General characteristics (as built)
- Class & type: Baltimore-class heavy cruiser Boston-class guided-missile cruiser
- Displacement: 14,472 long tons (14,704 t) (standard); 17,031 long tons (17,304 t) (max)
- Length: 673 ft 5 in (205.26 m) oa
- Beam: 70 ft 10 in (21.59 m)
- Draft: 20 ft 6 in (6.25 m) (mean); 26 ft 10 in (8.18 m) (max)
- Installed power: 4 × 615 psi Steam boilers; 120,000 shp (89,000 kW)
- Propulsion: 4 × General Electric geared turbines; 4 × screws
- Speed: 33 kn (38 mph; 61 km/h)
- Range: 10,000 nmi (19,000 km) at 15 kn (17 mph; 28 km/h)
- Complement: 1,142 officers and enlisted
- Armament: 3 × triple 8 in (200 mm)/55 caliber guns; 6 × dual 5 in (130 mm)/38 caliber anti-aircraft guns; 12 × quad 40 mm (1.6 in) Bofors anti-aircraft guns; 24 × single 20 mm (0.79 in) Oerlikon anti-aircraft cannons
- Armor: Belt: 4–6 in (100–150 mm); Deck: 2.5 in (64 mm); Barbettes: 6–6.3 in (150–160 mm); Turrets: 1.5–8 in (38–203 mm)
- Aircraft carried: 4 × floatplanes
- Aviation facilities: 2 × stern catapults

General characteristics (1955)
- Armament: 2 × triple 8 in (200 mm)/55 caliber guns; 5 × dual 5 in (130 mm)/38 caliber anti-aircraft guns; 6 × dual 3 in (76 mm)/50 caliber anti-aircraft guns; 2 × twin-rail Terrier SAM launcher (144 missiles)
- Aircraft carried: removed
- Aviation facilities: removed

USS Boston (CA-69/CAG-1), a Baltimore-class heavy cruiser and later a Boston-class guided missile cruiser, was the sixth ship of the United States Navy to be named for the U.S. city of Boston, Massachusetts. Boston was launched 26 August 1942 by Bethlehem Steel Company's Fore River Shipyard in Quincy, Massachusetts, sponsored by Mrs Helen Noonan Tobin, wife of the Mayor of Boston, Maurice J. Tobin, and commissioned 30 June 1943.

== Service history ==
=== World War II ===
Boston reported to the Pacific Fleet, arriving at Pearl Harbor 6 December 1943. She joined Task Force 58 (TF 58) in January and took part in the raids on the Marshall Islands in support of the invasions of Kwajalein, Majuro, and of Eniwetok (31 January – 28 February 1944).

Boston also supported the assaults on the Palaus and Western Carolines between 30 March and 1 April, and operations at Hollandia (currently known as Jayapura) and Western New Guinea on 21 – 24 April. The ship participated in the attack on Truk, including bombardment of Satawan Atoll between 29 April – 1 May. Boston supported the invasion of Saipan between 11 and 24 June. She also took part in several raids on the Bonin Islands in June and July and supported the carrier task forces during the Battle of the Philippine Sea on 19 June. Boston towed the Cleveland-class light cruiser USS Houston after she was torpedoed by a Japanese air attack.

Boston returned to the Marianas, to support the invasion of Guam on 12 July, until the completion of the campaign on 15 August. She also took part in the raids on Palau-Yap-Ulithi between 25 and 27 July, as well as the landings on Morotai on 15 September, and the seizure of the southern Palaus between 6 September – 14 October. She also supported the raids on the Philippine Islands, starting on 9 September until 24 September.

She served with TF 38 during the Okinawa raid on 10 October, and the northern Luzon and Formosa raid on 11–14 October, as well as the Luzon raids on 15 October and 24–26 October, 13–14 November and 19–20 November, and 14–16 December. Boston also participated in the Battle of Leyte Gulf on 24 October, as well as the Formosa raids in January, on 3–4, 9, 15, and 21 January 1945. Further raids on Luzon took place on 6–7 January, with raids in mainland China on 12 and 16 January. The carrier task force launched a raid on Nansei Shoto on 22 January, and Honshū and Nansei Shoto raids on 15–16 February and 1 March, in which she bombarded Japan.

Boston returned to the United States for overhaul, arriving at Long Beach, California, 25 March 1945. Returning to the Western Pacific, via Pearl Harbor and Eniwetok, she joined TF 38 for further raids on the Japanese home islands (20 July – 15 August), including the bombardment of Kamaishi, Honshū (9 August). Following the surrender of Japan, Boston remained in the Far East on occupation duty until 28 February 1946. She then returned to the United States and was placed out of commission in reserve at Puget Sound Naval Shipyard on 29 October 1946.

=== Recommissioned as guided missile cruiser ===
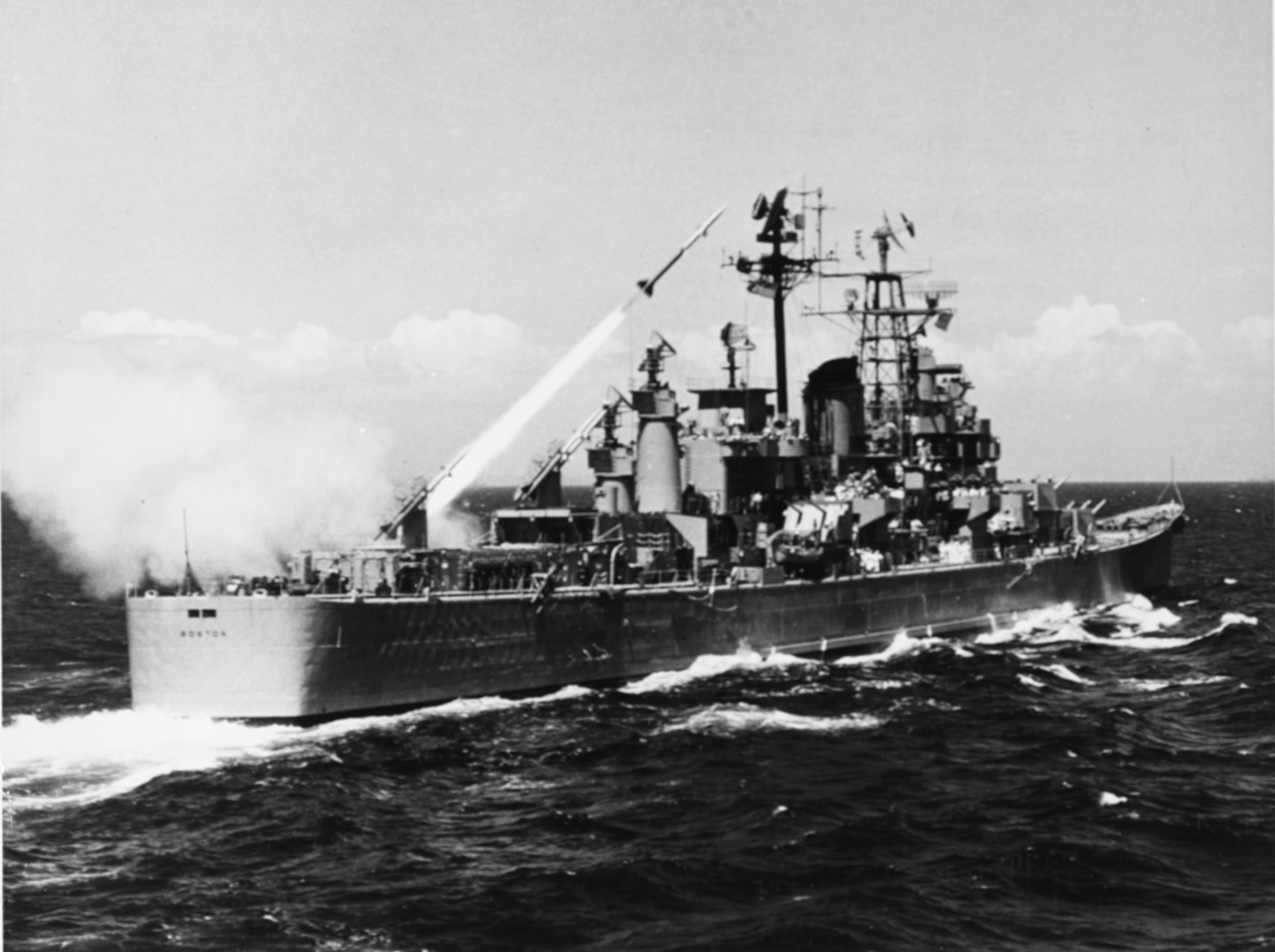
USS Boston firing a Terrier guided missile, August 1956.

Boston (along with Canberra and Chicago) was not recommissioned for service during the Korean War as were 10 others of her class, but was earmarked for conversion to carry guided missiles and reclassified CAG-1 on 4 January 1952. In February 1952 she was towed from Bremerton, Washington, to Philadelphia for conversion to a guided missile heavy cruiser by New York Shipbuilding Corporation, Camden, New Jersey. During conversion her aft 8-inch turret was replaced with Terrier Surface-to-air missile launchers and she was modernized. Boston was recommissioned 1 November 1955 as the lead ship of her class and operated along the east coast and in the Caribbean conducting missile evaluations and participating in fleet exercises until departing for the Mediterranean 23 November 1956. She returned in May 1957.

After making a Midshipmen's cruise to South America, taking part in NATO exercises in the North Atlantic, and receiving an overhaul, Boston made her second Sixth Fleet tour during June–September 1958. This cruise included participation in the Lebanon crisis. During the next eight years, she frequently operated in the Mediterranean, often in the role of flagship, taking part in exercises off Northern Europe, the Caribbean and off the US East Coast. Boston served as flagship for the recovery effort of the Palomares Incident from February through April 1966.

=== Vietnam War ===
In April 1967, Boston returned to the Pacific for the first time in fifteen years, transiting the Panama Canal to begin a tour of combat service with the 7th Fleet. Part of Naval Gunfire Support Task Unit 77.8.9 and Sea Dragon operations off North Vietnam, she fired thousands of rounds of eight- and five-inch shells against targets in North and South Vietnam. Though continuing to be based on the East Coast, the cruiser made two more deployments to the Western Pacific, in April–October 1968 and May–November 1969, the only 6th Fleet cruiser to make 3 tours to the combat zone. In May 1968, Boston was reclassified from "Guided-Missile Heavy Cruiser" to "Heavy Cruiser, Attack", reverting to her original hull number, CA-69. Though she retained her Terrier missiles, the swift advance of technology had made these weapons obsolete after little more than a dozen years' service, and her main battery was once again her six, eight-inch guns, of her forward turrets.

Friendly fire incident

On 16–17 June 1968, Boston was conducting naval gunfire support against North Vietnamese targets, in company with the destroyers USS Edson, USS Theodore E. Chandler and the Australian guided missile destroyer Hobart, when the group was attacked by USAF aircraft from the 366th Tactical Fighter Wing. The jets fired two missiles at Boston. One exploded 200 yards (180 m) off the port beam and the other close aboard to port, showering the ship with fragments. No sailors were injured and the missiles caused only minor structural damage. Hobart was later hit by three missiles, killing two sailors and wounding eight more. The US aircraft came around for a third attack but were scared off when Hobart fired at the aircraft.

Analysis determined that the missiles were AIM-7 Sparrow, designed to be used in an air-to-air role, and not in the inventory of Vietnamese People’s Air Force. Missile fragments found on Boston deck indicated they were manufactured in Waltham, Massachusetts, 11 miles west of Boston.

The ships were in the vicinity of Swift Boats PCF-12 & 19, which had come under attack by North Vietnamese helicopters with PCF-19 sunk and 5 killed. The US Navy officially records the incident as friendly fire.

== Decommissioning ==
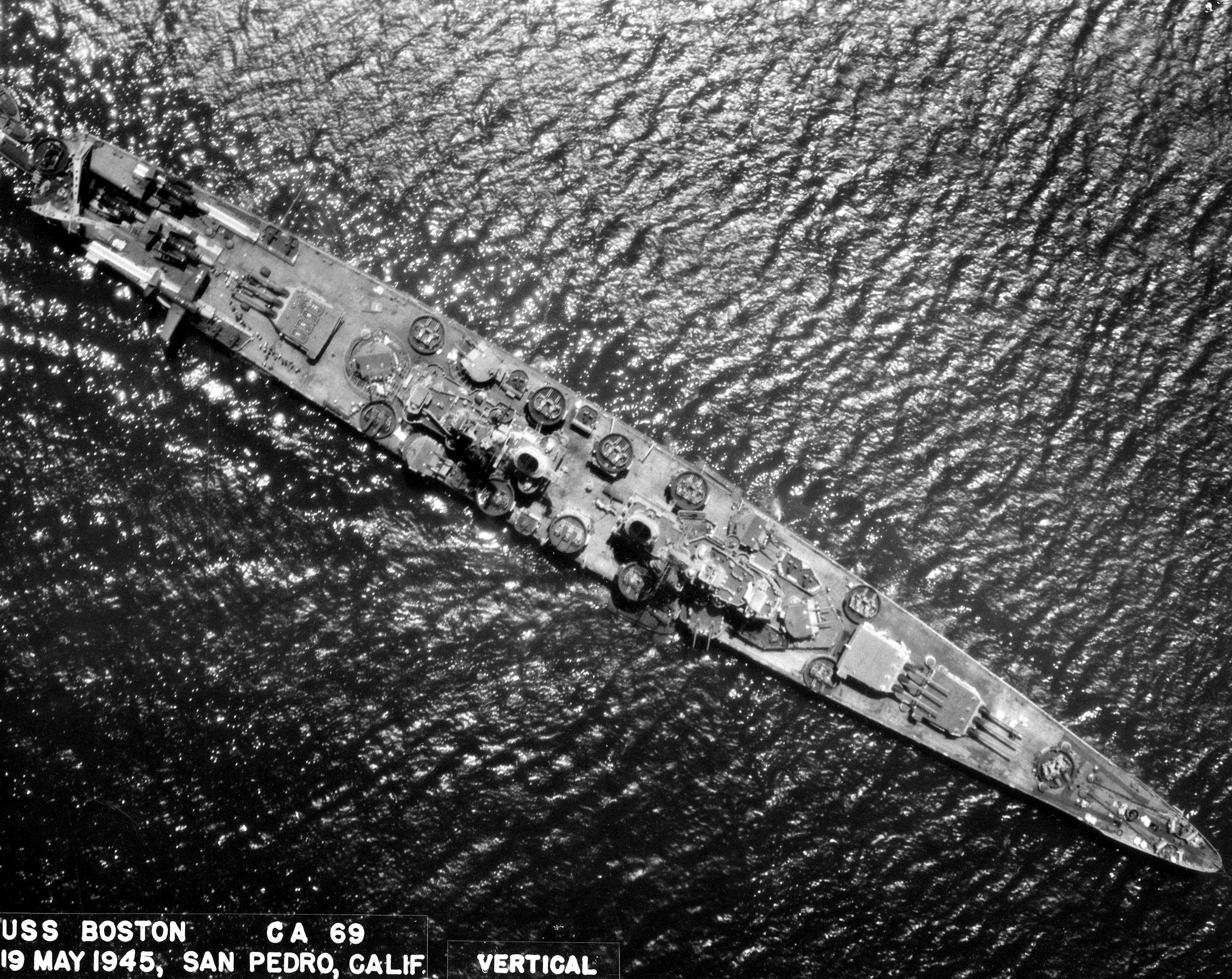
Overhead shot of USS Boston (CA-69), in her original configuration before becoming one of the US Navy's first missile cruisers (19 May 1945)

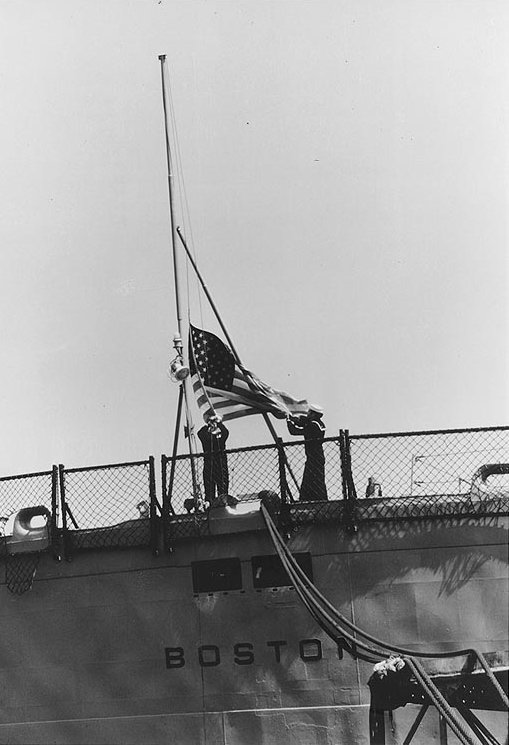
Boston's flag-lowering ceremony

While on her last Vietnam cruise thought and funding was given to overhauling Boston (and sister ship Canberra). Her Terrier missile system would have been upgraded to Standard Missile-ER with new radars and equipment for the modern missiles. Her gunnery systems, hull and electronics would have also been overhauled. With the reduction in defense spending, funds were reallocated to more modern ships and Boston sailed for a last visit and family day at her namesake city in late 1969 before decommissioning.

Senator Edward Kennedy had expressed views that she should be retained as a museum ship on the city's waterfront but no plans materialised so she began the inactivation process at Boston Navy Yard's Naval Annex, on the 5 May 1970, was stricken from the Naval Vessel Register in January 1973 and sold for scrapping in March 1975. Scrapping was completed in 1976.

== Awards ==
- Navy Unit Commendation
- Asiatic-Pacific Campaign Medal with 10 battle stars
- World War II Victory Medal
- Navy Occupation Medal(Asia clasp)
- National Defense Service Medal
- Vietnam Service Medal with 5 battle stars
- Republic of Vietnam Meritorious Unit Citation
- Republic of Vietnam Campaign Medal

Boston received 10 battle stars for her World War II service, 5 more during the Vietnam War and the Navy Unit Commendation for her naval gunfire support during the Battle of Đông Hà in May 1968.

Boston was honored with the Republic of Vietnam Meritorious Unit Citation- Gallantry for naval gunfire support and "Sea Dragon" operations during the period 30 July – 30 August 1968 and again for operations, Brave Armada and Durham Peak in June–July 1969.

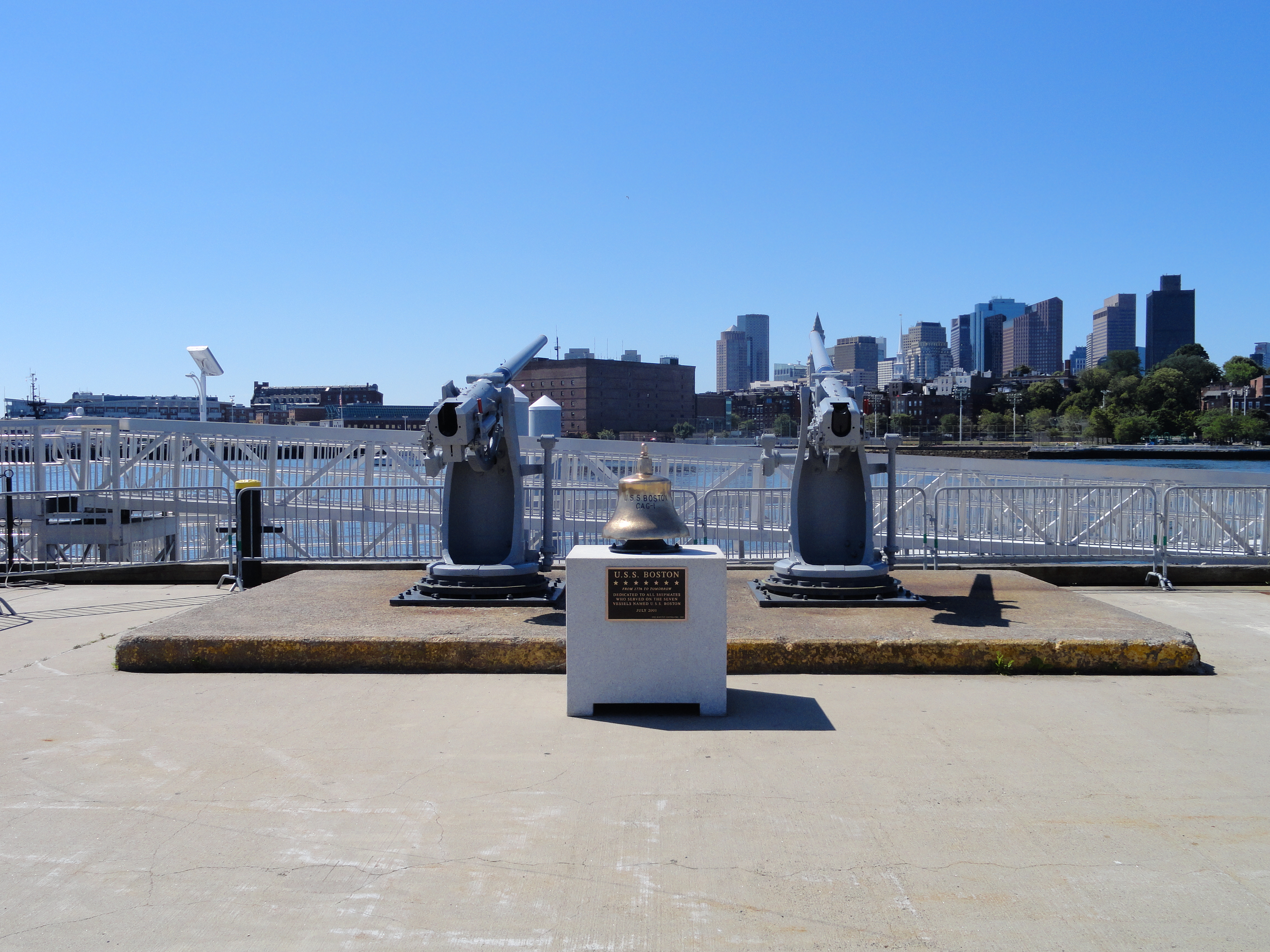
Ships Bell at the Boston Navy Yard
