= RIM-2 Terrier =

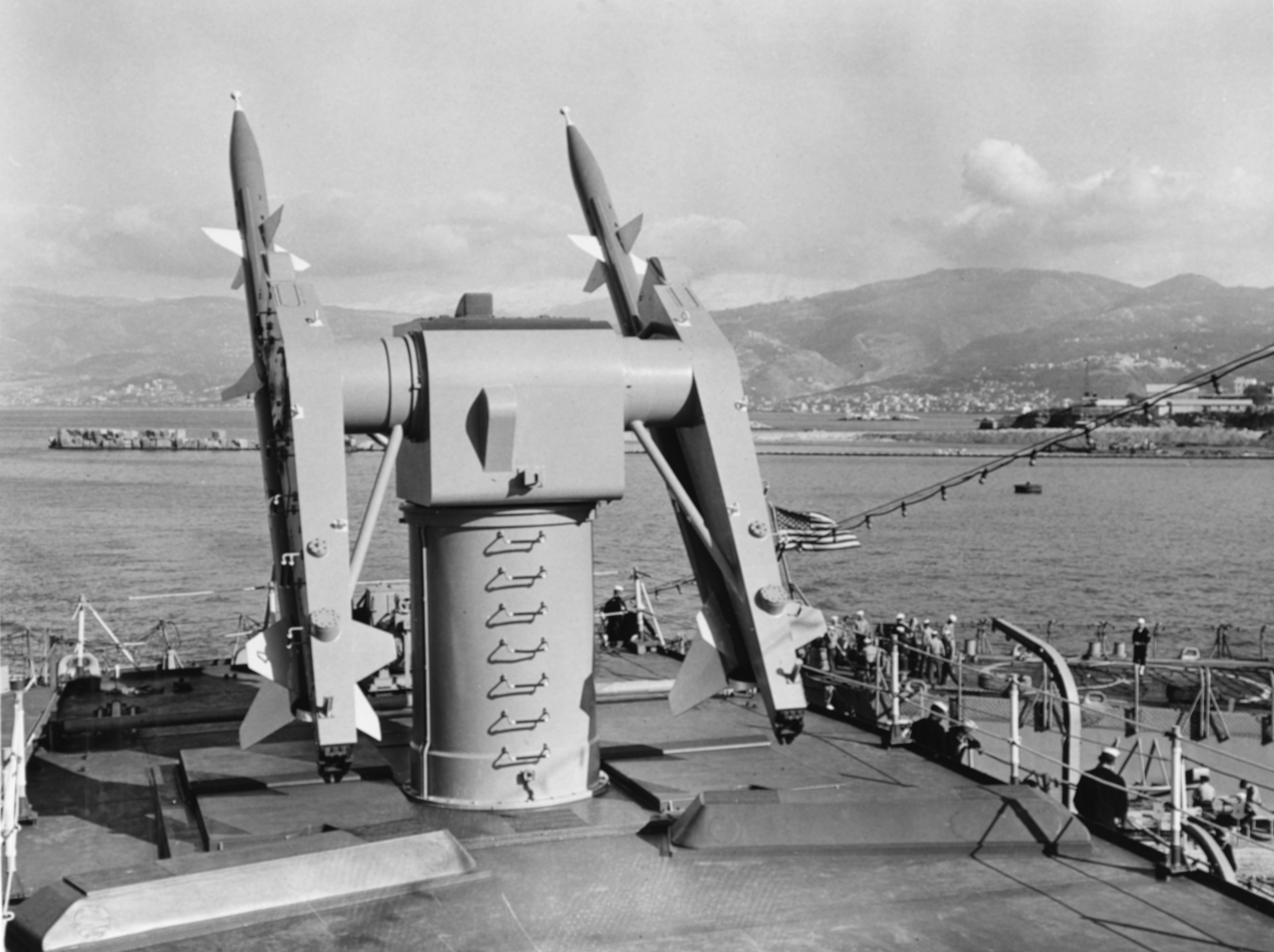
- RIM-2 Terrier onboard USS Boston
- Type: Medium range surface-to-air missile
- Place of origin: United States

Service history
- Used by: United States Navy, and others

Production history
- Manufacturer: Convair/General Dynamics - Pomona, California Division

Specifications
- Mass: 3,000 lb (1,400 kg) missile: 1,180 lb (540 kg), booster: 1,820 lb (830 kg)
- Length: 27 ft (8.2 m)
- Diameter: 13.5 in (34 cm)
- Warhead: 218 lb (99 kg) controlled-fragmentation or 1kT W45 nuclear warhead
- Engine: solid fuel rocket
- Propellant: solid rocket fuel
- Operational range: 17.3 nmi (32.0 km)
- Flight ceiling: 80,000 ft (24,000 m)
- Maximum speed: Mach 3.0 (3704 km/h)
- Guidance system: Semi-active radar homing
- Launch platform: Surface ship

The Convair RIM-2 Terrier was a two-stage medium-range naval surface-to-air missile (SAM), among the earliest SAMs to equip United States Navy ships. It underwent significant upgrades while in service, starting with beam-riding guidance with a 10-nautical-mile (19 km) range at a speed of Mach 1.8 and ending as a semi-active radar homing (SARH) system with a range of 40 nmi (74 km) at speeds as high as Mach 3. It was replaced in service by the RIM-67 Standard ER (SM-1ER).

Terrier has also been used as the base stage for a family of sounding rockets, beginning with the Terrier Malemute.

== History ==
The Terrier was a development of the Bumblebee Project, the United States Navy's effort to develop a surface-to-air missile to provide a middle layer of defense against air attack (between carrier fighters and antiaircraft guns). It was test launched from USS Mississippi on January 28, 1953, and first deployed operationally on the Boston-class cruisers, Boston and Canberra, in the mid-1950s, with Canberra being the first to achieve operational status on June 15, 1956. Its US Navy designation was SAM-N-7 until 1963, when it was redesignated RIM-2.

For a brief time during the mid-1950s, the United States Marine Corps (USMC) had two Terrier battalions equipped with specially modified twin sea launchers for land use that fired the SAM-N-7. The Terrier was the first surface-to-air missile operational with the USMC. The launchers were reloaded by a special vehicle that carried two Terrier reloads.

Initially, the Terrier used radar beam-riding guidance, forward aerodynamic controls, and a conventional warhead. It had a top speed of Mach 1.8, a range of 10 nmi (19 km), and was only effective against subsonic targets. Originally, the Terrier had a launch thrust of 23 kN (5,200 lb_{f}) and weight of 1,392 kg (3,069 lb). Its original dimensions were a diameter of 340 mm (13 in), a length of 8.08 m (26.5 ft), and a fin span of 1.59 m (5.2 ft). The cost per missile in 1957 was an estimated $60,000.

Even before it was in widespread service, the Terrier saw major improvements. The RIM-2C, named the Terrier BT-3 (Beam-riding, Tail control, series 3), was introduced in 1958. The forward control fins were replaced with fixed strakes, and the tail became the control surface. The BT-3 also had a new motor and featured an extended range, Mach 3 speed, and better maneuverability. The RIM-2D Terrier BT-3A(N) entered service in 1962 with a W301kt nuclear warhead, but all other variants used a 218 lb (99 kg) controlled-fragmentation warhead. The Terrier had 2 versions: BT-3(N) and HT-3. Only the BT-3A carried the nuclear warhead, BT-3A(N).

When fired, and after booster separation, its corkscrew contrail progressed to the center of the beam. Reception of its location in the beam was accomplished by a small turnstile antenna at the rear of the missile; this antenna also received the commands for detonation and self-destruct. The self destruct-command was sent a few milliseconds after the detonation command. The HT-3 was a SARH missile; it followed the reflected energy from the target. However, if jamming was encountered, it would passively home in on the jamming signal.

The Belknap class of DLG, redesignated CG, also carried the ASROC (Anti Submarine Rocket), which was launched from the same launcher as the Terrier. The Belknap class had three circular magazines in a triangle pattern. The bottom magazine contained the nuclear BT-3A(N) missiles and the Nuclear Anti-Submarine Rocket (ASROC). This was an additional safety feature in that it involved transferring the nuclear missile from the bottom ring to the upper ring and then to the launcher rails, which entailed many moving steps and time, preventing the accidental loading of a nuclear missile from one of the top two magazines.

The RIM-2E introduced SARH for greater effectiveness against low-flying targets. The final version, the RIM-2F, used a new motor that doubled effective range to 40 nmi (74 km).

The Terrier was the primary missile system of most US Navy cruisers and guided missile frigates built during the 1960s. It could be installed on much smaller ships than the much larger and longer-ranged RIM-8 Talos. A Terrier installation typically consisted of the Mk 10 twin-arm launcher with a 40-round rear-loading magazine. Some ships had extended magazines with 60 or 80 rounds, and the installation in Boston and Canberra used a bottom-loading magazine of 72 rounds.

The French Navy's Masurca missile was developed with some technology provided by the USN from Terrier.

The Terrier was replaced by the extended range RIM-67 Standard missile. The RIM-67 offered the range of the much larger RIM-8 Talos in a missile the size of the Terrier.

The system was decommissioned in USN service in 1995 and by the last foreign user, the Italian Navy, in 2006.

=== Combat service ===
On April 19, 1972, a Terrier missile fired by USS Sterett was claimed by the US to have shot down a North Vietnamese Air Force MiG-17F in the Battle of Dong Hoi.

=== Research use ===
Terrier has also been used, typically as a first stage in a sounding rocket, for conducting high-altitude research. The Terrier can be equipped with various upper stages, like the Asp, the TE-416 Tomahawk (not to be confused with the similarly named BGM-109 Tomahawk cruise missile), the Orion, or any of a variety of purpose-built second stages such as Oriole or Malemute. The booster also served as the basis for the MIM-3 Nike Ajax booster, which was slightly larger but otherwise similar, and has also seen widespread use in sounding rockets.

== Terrier versions ==
Designation	Early designation	Guidance	Control surfaces	Notes
RIM-2A	SAM-N-7 BW-0	Beam-riding	Wing control	Subsonic targets only
RIM-2B	SAM-N-7 BW-1	Beam-riding	Wing control	Subsonic targets only
RIM-2C	SAM-N-7 BT-3	Beam-riding	Tail control	In service 1958, supersonic targets
RIM-2D	SAM-N-7 BT-3A	Beam-riding	Tail control	Doubled range
RIM-2D	SAM-N-7 BT-3A(N)	Beam-riding	Tail control	W45 nuclear 1kT yield
RIM-2E	SAM-N-7 HT-3	Semi-active radar homing	Tail control	Introduced semi-active homing
RIM-2F		Semi-active radar homing	Tail control	New rocket motor

== Operators ==
Italian Navy

- Giuseppe Garibaldi (1936) – after 1957 refit
- Andrea Doria-class cruiser
  - Italian cruiser Andrea Doria (C 553)
  - Italian cruiser Caio Duilio (C 554)
- Vittorio Veneto (550)

Royal Netherlands Navy

- De Zeven Provinciën (C802)

United States Navy

- Gyatt (DDG-712)
- Boston-class cruiser
- Farragut-class destroyer
- Providence-class cruiser
- Long Beach-class cruiser
- Leahy-class cruiser
- Belknap-class cruiser
- Kitty Hawk-class carrier

United States Marine Corps

== Gallery ==
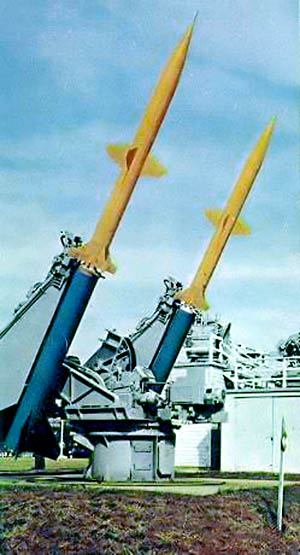
Early-model Terrier

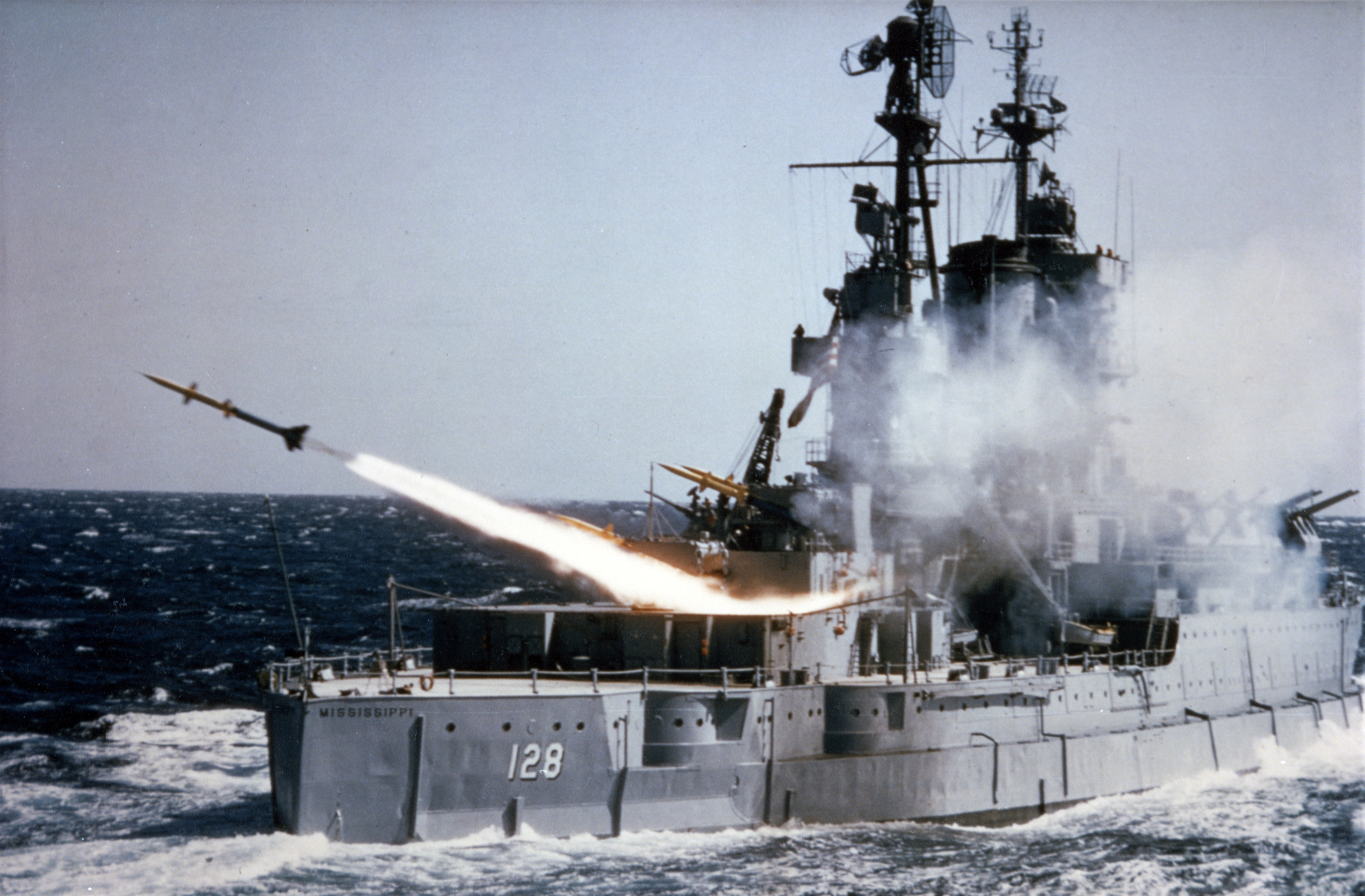
Early Model Terrier launched from test vessel USS Mississippi

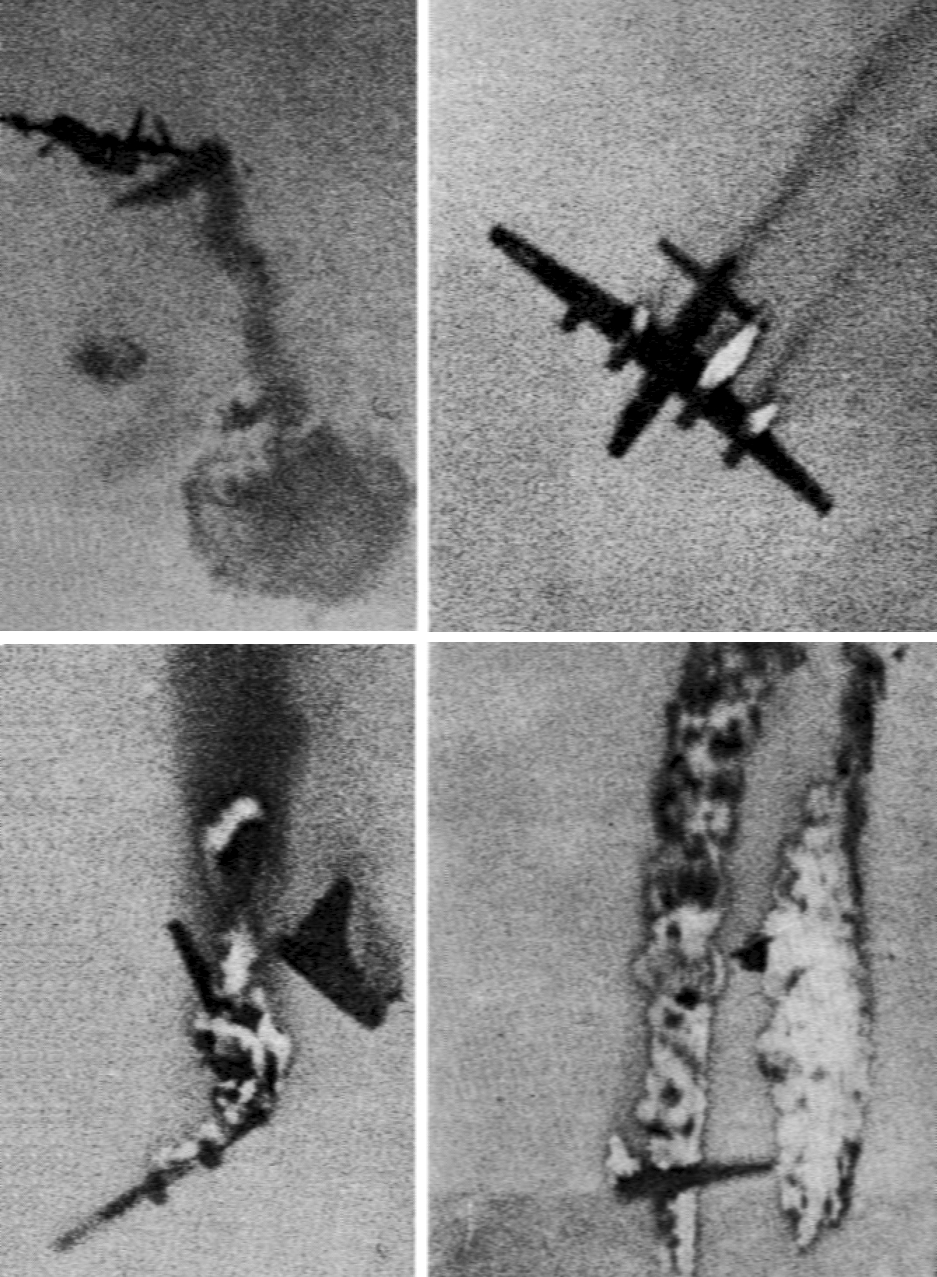
A P4Y-2K drone being shot down by a Terrier, 1956.

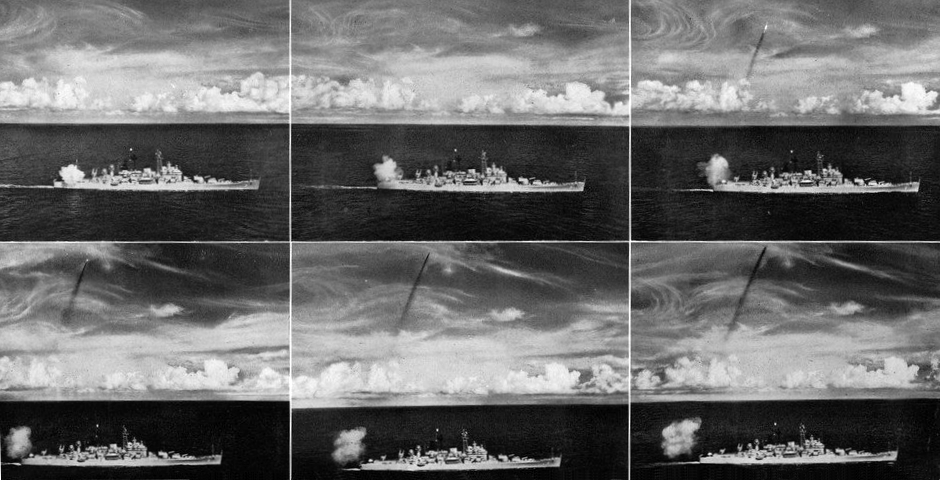
USS Canberra launching a Terrier, 1960.

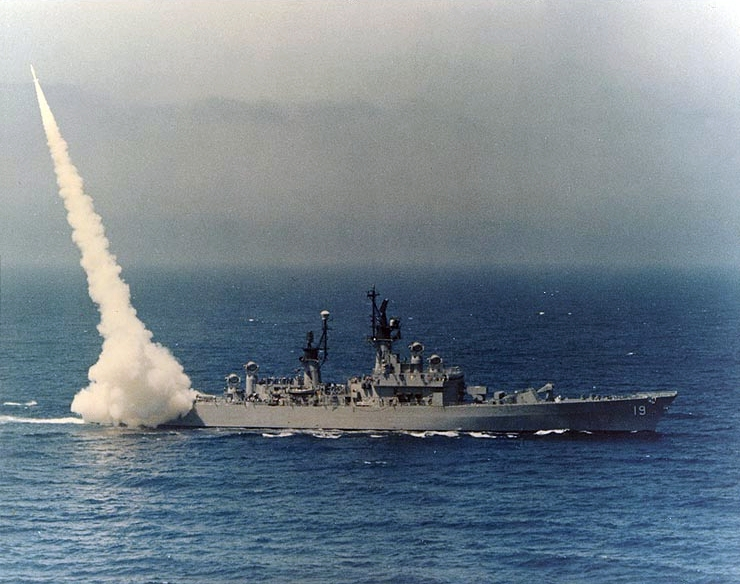
Terrier launch from USS Dale, 1964.

== See also ==
- USS Norton Sound (AVM-1)
- RIM-24 Tartar
- Terasca
- Masurca – a related project
