= Boston-class cruiser =

United States Navy cruiser class

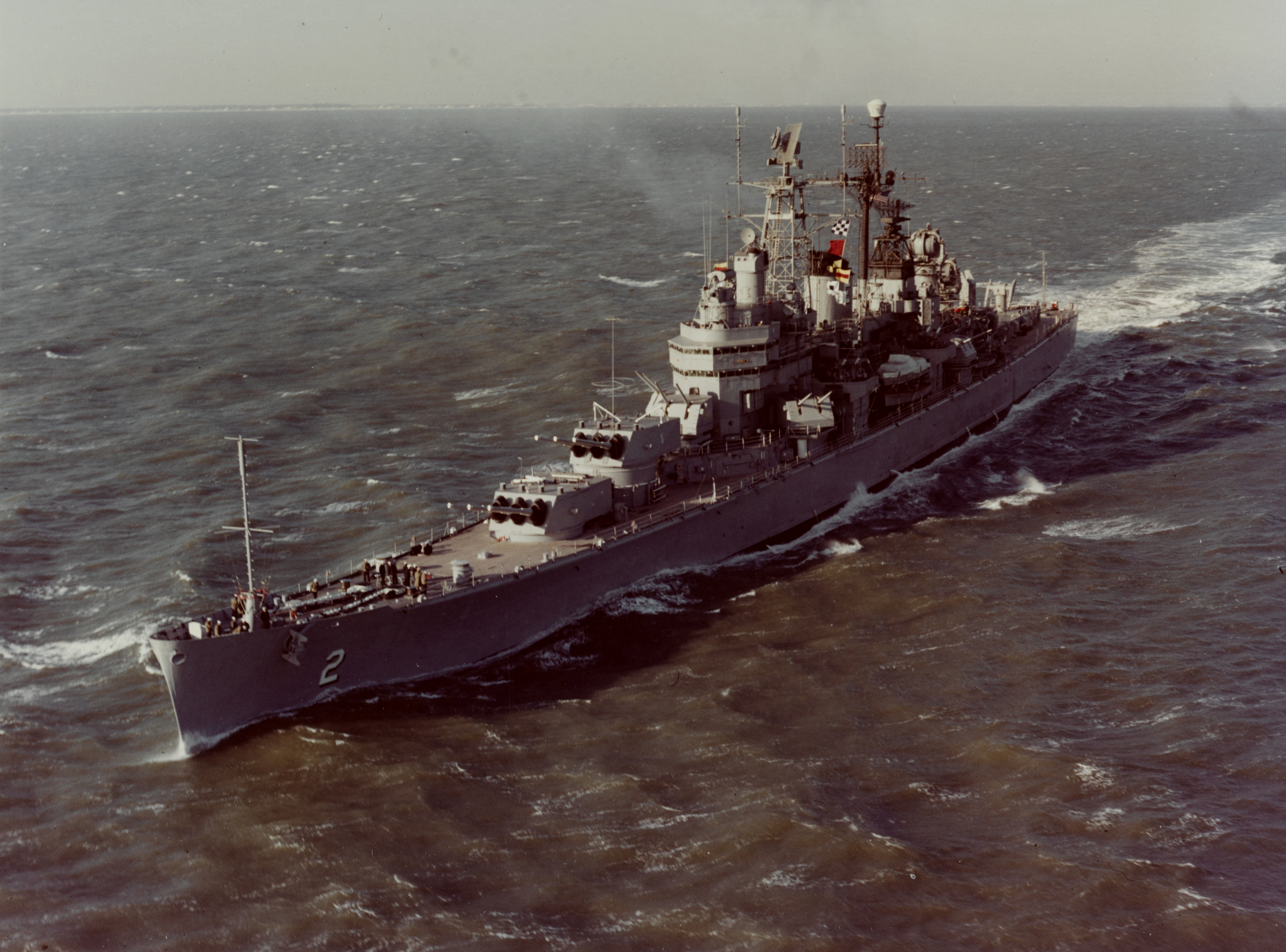
- USS Canberra on 9 January 1961

Class overview
- Builders: New York Shipbuilding, NJ (2)
- Operators: United States Navy
- Preceded by: N/A
- Succeeded by: Galveston class
- Subclasses: Baltimore class
- Built: 1941-1943
- In commission: 1955—1970
- Completed: 2
- Retired: 2

General characteristics
- Type: Guided missile cruiser
- Displacement: 13,600 tons
- Length: 673 ft 3 in (205.2 m)
- Beam: 71 ft 10 in (21.9 m)
- Draft: 26 ft 10 in (8.2 m)
- Installed power: 120,000 shp (89,484 kW)
- Propulsion: 4 × 615 psi (4.2 MPa) water-tube boilers 4 × General Electric geared steam turbines 4 × shafts
- Speed: 33 knots (61 km/h; 38 mph)
- Complement: 1,142 officers and enlisted
- Sensors & processing systems: 1950s: AN/SPS-6 air-search radar; AN/SPS-8A height-finding radar; AN/SPS-10 surface-search radar; AN/SPS-12 air-search radar; AN/SPQ-5 fire-control radar; CXRX hemisphere-scan radar; 1960s: AN/SPS-13 air-search radar (Canberra); AN/SPS-29 early-warning radar; AN/SPQ-5 fire-control radar; AN/SPG-35 fire-control radar; AN/URN-3 TACAN
- Armament: 2 × triple 8"/55 caliber guns; 5 × dual 5"/38 caliber guns; 4 × dual 3"/50 caliber guns; 2 × dual Mark 4 RIM-2 Terrier missile launcher
- Aviation facilities: Helipad

The United States Navy's Boston class were the first guided missile cruisers in the world. Both ships in this experimental class were originally Baltimore-class heavy cruisers that had been decommissioned after World War II, but were redesignated as guided missile heavy cruisers (CAGs) and entered refit in 1952. The lengthy conversion and modernization project (a.k.a. SCB 48) involved replacing the aft triple 8-inch gun turret and its supporting structure with two twin launchers for Terrier anti-aircraft guided missiles. The forward two 8-inch gun turrets remained unchanged. The forward superstructure was modified to include the Terrier's associated radars and electronics, the aft superstructure was completely replaced, and the Baltimore class's two funnels were trunked to one.

Owing to the Boston class's experimental nature, the ships were only partially converted, with a full conversion to be carried out if the new weapon systems were successful. Had the ships been fully converted, the forward 8-inch turrets would have been replaced with additional Terrier launchers.

In 1968 both Boston-class guided missile heavy cruisers were reclassified back to heavy cruisers (CAs), in part due to the extensive use of their 8-inch guns for shore bombardment during the Vietnam War. While they had retained their Terrier missiles, the swift advance of technology had made these pioneering weapons obsolete after little more than a dozen years' service, and the ships' main battery was once again their six remaining 8-inch guns in the forward turrets.

Various proposals for limited modernization or complete reconstruction (including SCB 003.68) were considered but ultimately rejected. In 1970 both Boston class ships were decommissioned for the final time, eventually struck from the Naval Vessel Register, and sold for scrap.

== Ships in class ==
| Ship Name | Hull No. | Converted at | Laid down | Launched | Commissioned | Decommissioned | Fate |
|---|---|---|---|---|---|---|---|
| Boston | CAG-1 | New York Shipbuilding Corporation | 30 June 1941 | 26 August 1942 | 1 November 1955 | 5 May 1970 | Sold for scrap, 28 March 1975 |
| Canberra | CAG-2 | New York Shipbuilding Corporation | 3 September 1941 | 19 April 1943 | 15 June 1956 | 2 February 1970 | Sold for scrap, 31 July 1980 |

== See also ==
- List of cruisers of the United States Navy
