= USS Canberra (CA-70) =

US Navy guided missile cruiser

Coordinates: 33.8694298°S 151.1986428°E

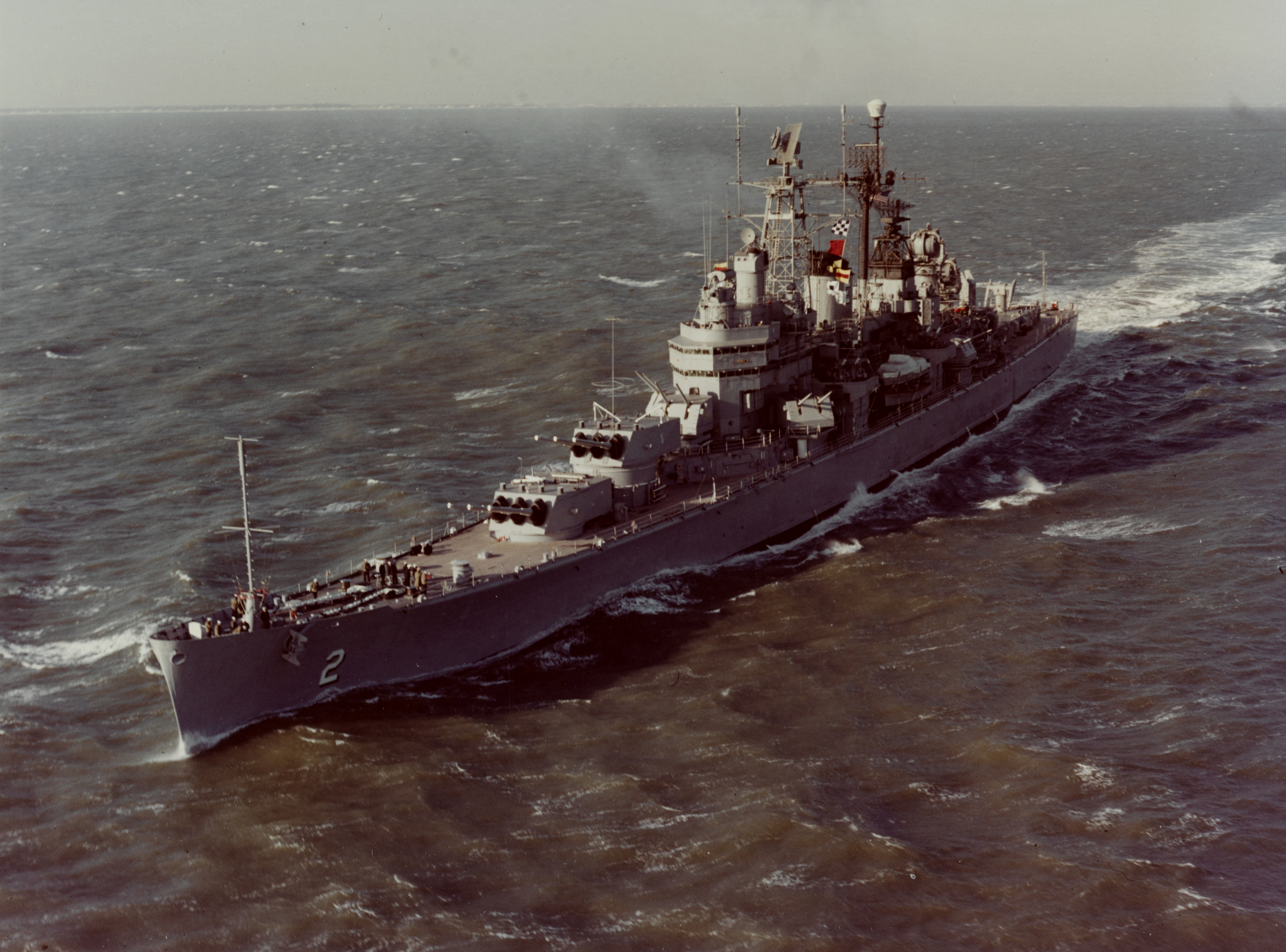
- USS Canberra underway on 9 January 1961

History

United States
- Name: Canberra
- Namesake: HMAS Canberra (D33)
- Ordered: 1 July 1940
- Builder: Fore River Shipyard
- Laid down: 3 September 1941
- Launched: 19 April 1943
- Sponsored by: Alice Dixon
- Commissioned: 14 October 1943
- Decommissioned: 7 March 1947
- Recommissioned: 15 June 1956
- Decommissioned: 2 February 1970
- Reclassified: CAG-2, 4 January 1952; CA-70, 1 May 1968
- Stricken: 31 July 1978
- Identification: Callsign: NBLS; Hull number: CA-70
- Nickname(s): Can-Do Kangaroo (alternatively Kan-Do Kangaroo)
- Honors and awards: See Awards
- Fate: Scrapped, 31 July 1980
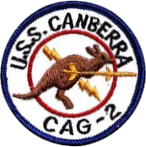
- Badge

General characteristics
- Class & type: Baltimore-class cruiser (as CA-70); Boston-class cruiser (as CAG-2)
- Displacement: 13,600 tons
- Length: 673 ft 5 in (205.26 m)
- Beam: 70 ft 10 in (21.59 m)
- Draught: 20 ft 6 in (6.25 m)
- Propulsion: Steam turbines, 4 × 615-psi boilers
- Speed: 33 knots (61 km/h; 38 mph)
- Complement: 1,142 officers and enlisted
- Armament: As CA-70: 9 × 8"/55 guns (203 mm); 12 × 5"/38 guns (127 mm); As CAG-2: 6 × 8"/55 guns (203 mm); 10 × 5 in (130 mm) guns, 12 × 3 in (76 mm) guns (76 mm), 2 × twin-rail Terrier SAM launchers

USS Canberra (CA-70/CAG-2) was a Baltimore-class cruiser and later a Boston-class guided missile cruiser of the United States Navy (USN). Originally to be named USS Pittsburgh, the ship was renamed before launch to honor the Australian cruiser HMAS Canberra sunk during the Battle of Savo Island. Canberra was the first USN warship named after a foreign capital city, and one of the few named after a foreign warship not captured in battle with a USN ship.

The ship entered service in 1943 and served in the Pacific theater of World War II until she was torpedoed during the Aerial Battle of Taiwan-Okinawa and forced to return to the United States for repairs. Placed in reserve after the war, Canberra was selected for conversion into the second guided-missile carrying warship in the USN fleet. Following the conversion, she was host to the ceremony for selecting the Unknown Soldier representing World War II in 1958, undertook an eight-month round-the-world cruise in 1960, participated in the Cuban Missile Crisis naval blockade in 1962, and was deployed to the Vietnam War on five occasions between 1965 and 1969.

== Construction ==
The Baltimore-class heavy cruiser was laid down as USS Pittsburgh by the Bethlehem Steel Company Fore River Shipyard at Quincy in Massachusetts on 3 September 1941. During construction, in recognition of the valor displayed by the Australian cruiser HMAS Canberra during the Battle of Savo Island, United States President Franklin Delano Roosevelt wished to commemorate the Australian ship's loss by naming a US ship in her honor: Pittsburgh was selected and renamed USS Canberra. The ship was launched on 19 April 1943 by Alice, Lady Dixon, the wife of Sir Owen Dixon, Australia's ambassador to the United States, and is one of two United States warships (the other being the Littoral Class Combat Ship USS Canberra (LCS-30)) to be named after a foreign capital city. Canberra was commissioned into the USN on 14 October 1943, Captain Alex Rieman Early, USN commanding. The Australian Government returned this tribute by naming a new Tribal-class destroyer, HMAS Bataan, in honor of the US stand during the Battle of Bataan.

== Operational history ==
=== World War II ===
She left Boston in January 1944, San Diego, and joined Task Force 58 in mid-February. In late February, the ship provided bombardment support during the Battle of Eniwetok. During March and April, the cruiser formed part of the USS Yorktown carrier task group, supporting the aircraft carrier during air raids on Palaus, Yap, Ulithi and Woleai during 31 March and 1 April. On 13 April, Canberra escorted Yorktown's aircraft when they provided support to amphibious landings at Hollandia and Wakde.

From 29 April to 1 May, the cruiser was attached to the USS Enterprise group for air attacks on Truk, during the operation, Canberra detached to shell a Japanese airbase at Satawan. The cruiser was involved in raids on Marcus and Wake Islands during May, and in June joined operations to capture the Mariana and Palau Islands. As part of this campaign, Canberra participated in the Battle of the Philippine Sea, and shelled Japanese positions in the Bonin Islands. During August and September, the ship performed raids on the Palaus and the Philippines providing gunfire support during the Morotai landings.

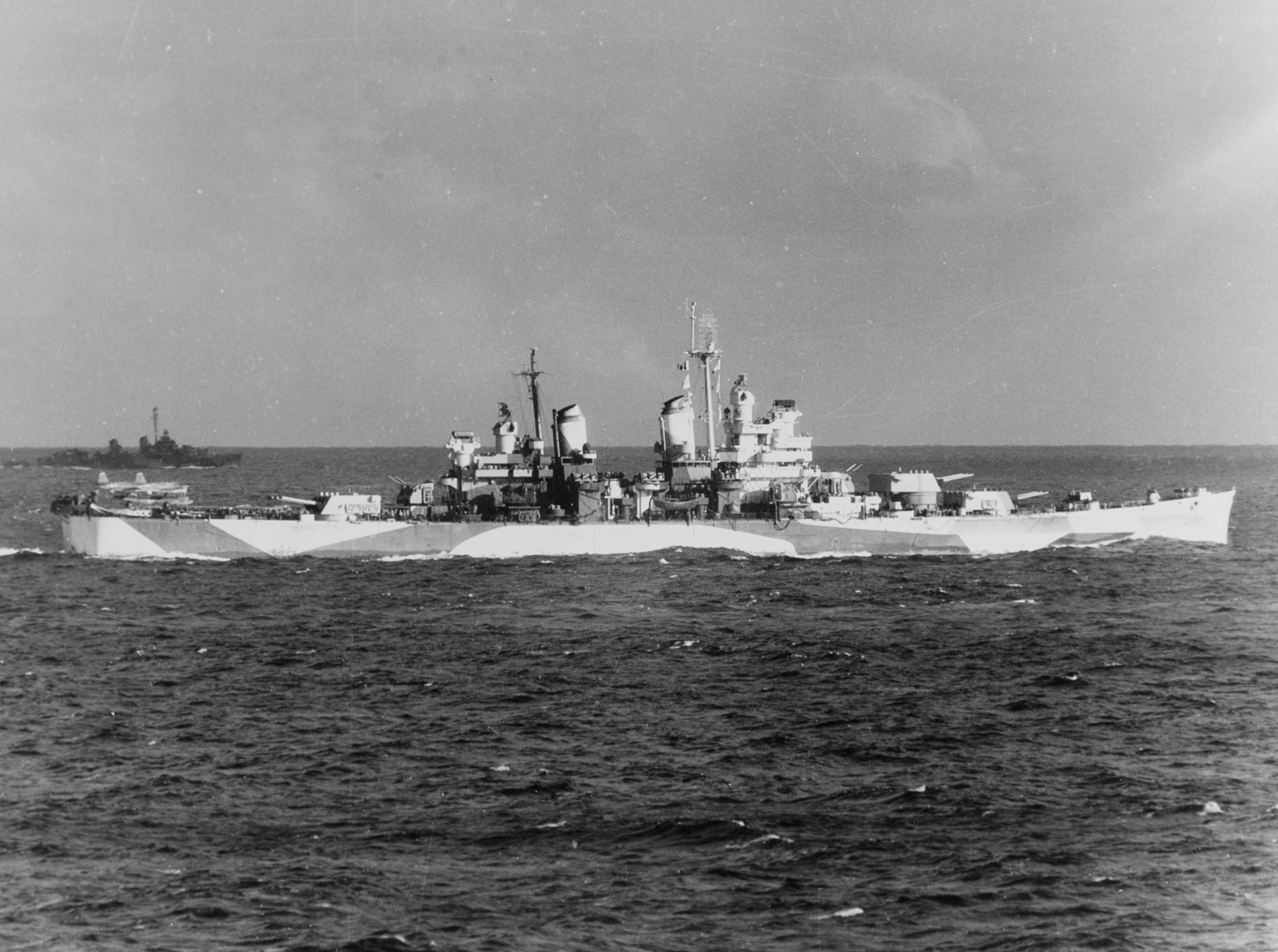
Canberra underway as part of Task Force 38 in 1944

At the start of October, Canberra joined Task Force 38, tasked with performing air raids on Okinawa and Taiwan, in preparation for the landings at Leyte. On 13 October, an air-dropped torpedo from a Japanese aircraft hit the cruiser below her armour belt. The explosion killed 23 personnel and exposed the engineering spaces to the ocean, stalling the ship. USS Wichita took Canberra under tow for a rendezvous with the tug USS Munsee, which took over the tow after putting a salvage crew aboard. During the tow, the salvage officer from Munsee was killed while diving in the cruiser's flooded engine room to make temporary repairs. A week into the tow towards Ulithi, Munsee was joined by the War Shipping Administration leased tug Watch Hill. It took another week for the two tugboats to bring Canberra to the repair ship USS Ajax. After temporary repairs at Manus, Canberra sailed under her own power to Boston Navy Yard. The cruiser was docked for repairs, which lasted from February to October 1945. The cruiser was deployed to the west coast of the United States in late 1945.

Canberra received seven battle stars for her wartime service.

=== Boston class conversion ===
Canberra was decommissioned on 7 March 1947 and berthed with the Pacific Reserve Fleet at the Puget Sound Naval Shipyard, located in Bremerton, Washington. Canberra and sister ship Boston were marked for conversion into guided missile cruisers, Canberra was redesignated with the hull number CAG-2 and on 4 January 1952, she was towed to the New York Shipbuilding Corporation at Camden, New Jersey, for conversion into a Boston-class cruiser.

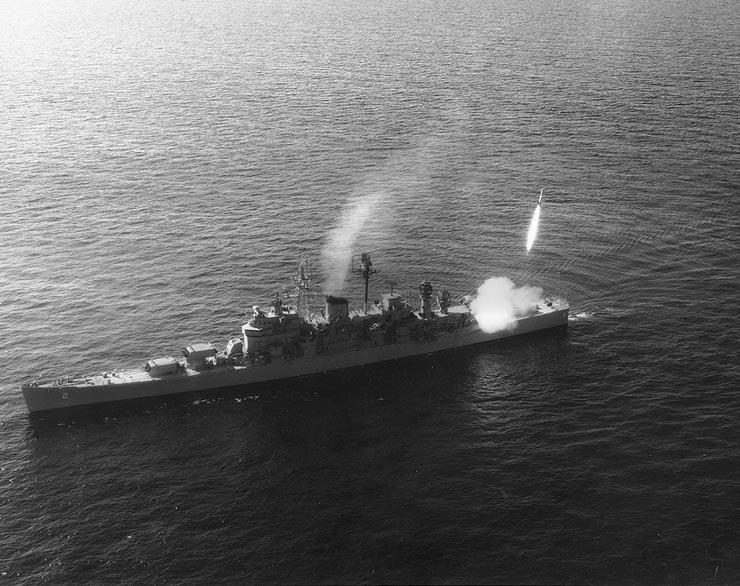
Canberra firing a Terrier missile following her Boston class conversion

During the conversion, Canberra's aft 8-inch and 5-inch gun turrets were replaced with two twin RIM-2 Terrier missile launchers. Her aft superstructure was rebuilt, and the two funnels were redesigned as a single unit. The upgrade of the ship concluded in June 1956, making Canberra the second guided-missile ship in the USN fleet. If the conversion proved successful, the plan was to replace the rest of the ship's gun armament with missiles at a later date. However, by 1964, the rapid advancement of missile technology made the Terrier system obsolete, and full conversion was not pursued.

=== Post-conversion career ===
Canberra was recommissioned on 15 June 1956, and homeported at Norfolk, Virginia. From June until March 1957, the cruiser operated from Norfolk and through the Caribbean. On 14 March, Canberra delivered President Dwight D. Eisenhower to Bermuda for a conference with Harold Macmillan, the British Prime Minister. On 12 June, the cruiser served as review ship for the International Naval Review at Hampton Roads. After a training cruise during July and August, Canberra was deployed to the Mediterranean for NATO Operation Strikeback.

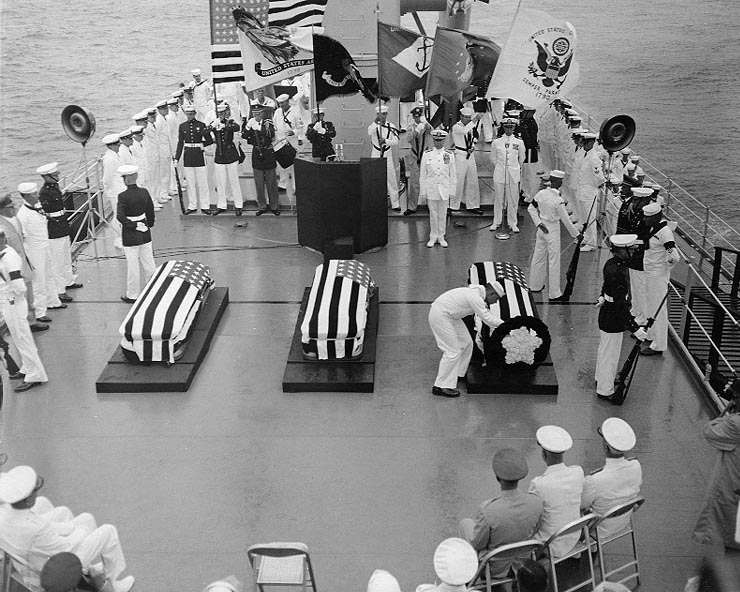
The caskets for the Unknown Soldiers of World War II (outer two) and the Korean War (center) during the ceremony aboard Canberra to select the World War II Unknown to be buried at Arlington National Cemetery

The cruiser returned to American waters on 9 March 1958. In mid-April 1958, Boston and Canberra hosted a change of command ceremonies in which Rear Admiral Charles B. Martell relieved Rear Admiral Charles L. Melson as Commander Cruiser Division Four at Norfolk Naval Base.

On 26 May, the ceremony for the selection of the Unknown Soldier representing World War II occurred aboard Canberra. From June to August, the cruiser sailed on another training cruise, before docking at Norfolk Naval Shipyard for overhaul.

From 3 March until 24 October 1960, the cruiser made an 8-month round-the-world cruise to show the flag and demonstrate her missile capabilities to U.S. and Allied forces. During the voyage, she flew the flag of Rear Admiral J. McN. Taylor, Commander of the Atlantic Fleet Cruiser Force and Cruiser Division 6. During this deployment, the ship visited the site of her Australian cruiser namesake's sinking, along with locations where the American cruiser had herself served during World War II.

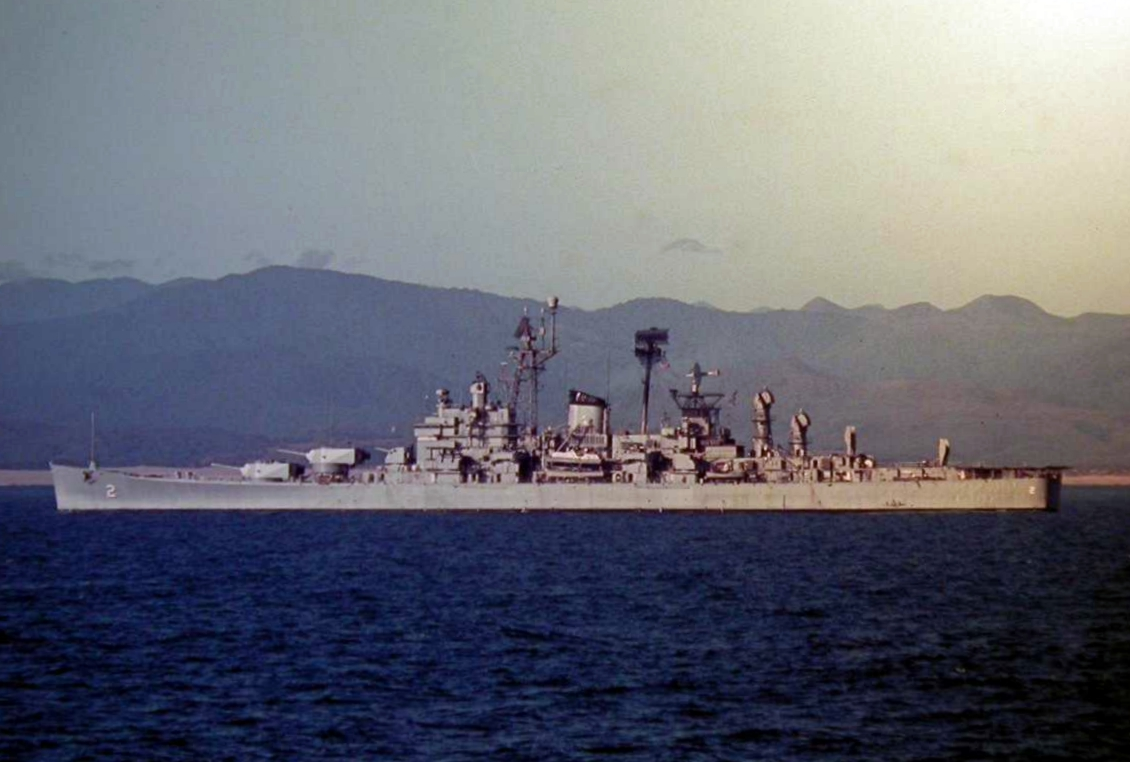
Canberra off the coast of South Vietnam during her 1966 WESTPAC cruise

In 1962, she sailed south from Norfolk to participate in the naval blockade during the Cuban Missile Crisis. During the Vietnam War, Canberra was homeported at San Diego. She deployed to Vietnam five times from 1965 to 1969 where her 8-inch and 5-inch guns provided support for US troops. During the deployments in 1967 and 1968, Canberra operated north of the DMZ shelling bridges, transport routes and shore installations. On 2 March 1967, the cruiser was hit by two shells fired from ashore, which caused 5 injuries and minor structural damage. On 6 April 1967, a young seaman named Doug Hegdahl was accidentally blown overboard by one of the 5-inch guns; he was captured by a North Vietnamese gunboat and imprisoned in the infamous Hanoi Hilton. Hegdahl's recollections of his time there would later serve as proof of torture committed by the North Vietnamese at POW camps. At the conclusion of her second tour of duty in April 1967, the cruiser visited Melbourne, and was in Australian waters in May for commemorations of the Battle of the Coral Sea.

During the 1968 Tet Offensive, Canberra went south to support the troops at Hue and fired 35,000 rounds in 31 days. On 1 May 1968, Canberra returned to her original hull number of CA-70; following the obsolescence of her missile armament, her 8-inch guns were reclassified as the cruiser's main armament, although the Terrier launchers were retained until 1969. Her last Vietnam deployment ended in early January 1969.

== Decommissioning and fate ==
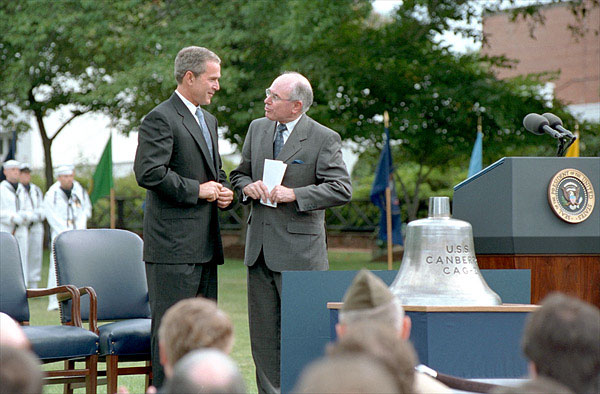
George W. Bush and John Howard during the presentation of Canberra's bell to the Australian government

USS Canberra was decommissioned on 2 February 1970 and stricken from the Naval Vessel Register on 31 July 1978. She was sold for scrap to National Metal on 15 July 1980, and removed from the Suisun Bay Inactive Ship Maintenance Facility on 1 August and broken up.

One of the ship's propellers was placed on display at the Los Angeles Maritime Museum. The ship's bell was kept in storage, and despite US law preventing the possession of naval artefacts by other nations, a campaign led to the bell being presented to Australian Prime Minister John Howard by US President George W. Bush on 10 September 2001, as commemoration for the 50 years of the ANZUS treaty. The 250-pound (110 kg) bell was placed on display in the USA Gallery of the Australian National Maritime Museum.

== Awards ==
- Combat Action Ribbon
- Meritorious Unit Citation
- Navy Expeditionary Medal
- Asiatic-Pacific Campaign Medal with seven battle stars
- World War II Victory Medal
- National Defense Service Medal
- Armed Forces Expeditionary Medal
- Vietnam Service Medal with four campaign stars
- Philippine Liberation Ribbon
- Republic of Vietnam Campaign Medal
