= Italian cruiser Andrea Doria =

Naval helicopter cruiser (1964–1992)

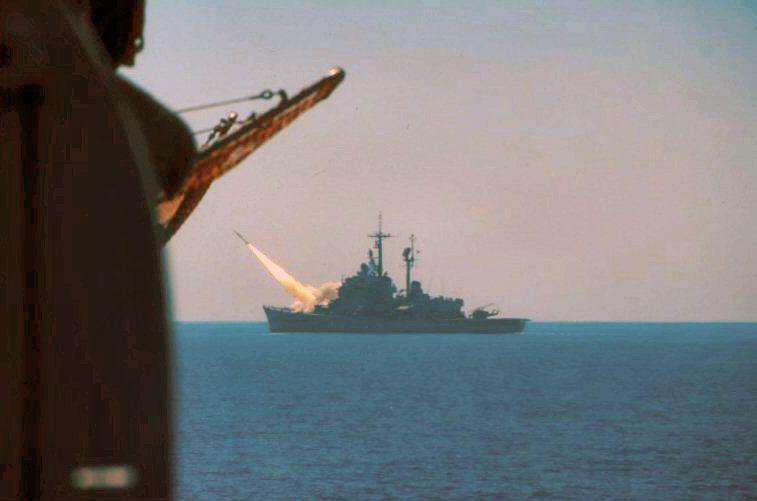
- Andrea Doria while launching a Terrier SAM in Sardinia in 1985, seen from the frigate Grecale.

History

Italy
- Name: Andrea Doria
- Namesake: Andrea Doria
- Builder: Cantieri del Tirreno, Riva Trigoso
- Laid down: 11 May 1958
- Launched: 27 February 1963
- Commissioned: 23 February 1964
- Decommissioned: 30 September 1992
- Fate: Scrapped

General characteristics
- Class & type: Andrea Doria-class cruiser
- Displacement: 6,500 long tons (6,604 t)
- Length: 149.2 m (489 ft 6 in)
- Beam: 17.2 m (56 ft 5 in)
- Draught: 5 m (16 ft 5 in)
- Propulsion: Steam turbines, 4 boilers, 2 shafts, 60,000 shp (45 MW)
- Speed: 30 knots (56 km/h; 35 mph)
- Range: 3,500 nmi (6,500 km)
- Complement: 485
- Armament: 1 × Terrier SAM (40 missiles); 8 × 76 mm AA guns; 6 × 12.75 in (324 mm) torpedo tubes
- Aircraft carried: 4 helicopters

Andrea Doria (C 553) was an Andrea Doria-class helicopter cruiser of the Marina Militare. Built by the Cantieri del Tirreno at Riva Trigoso (Liguria), it was named after the Genoese Renaissance admiral Andrea Doria.

== History ==
Laid down in 1958, the ship was launched in 1962, and commissioned in 1964.

Initially based at La Spezia, the ship participated in numerous military training exercise in the Mediterranean, and in humanitarian campaigns in Far East and in the Tyrrhenian Sea, such as the search for victims of the Ustica Massacre and recovery of homeless people in the port of Naples after the 1980 Irpinia earthquake.

Later it was moved to Taranto as flagship of the 2nd Naval Division. It was decommissioned in 1992 after further operations, including support to the Italian mission in the Lebanon War and during the American Bombing of Libya (1986).
