= Andrea Doria-class cruiser =

Helicopter cruisers of the Italian Navy

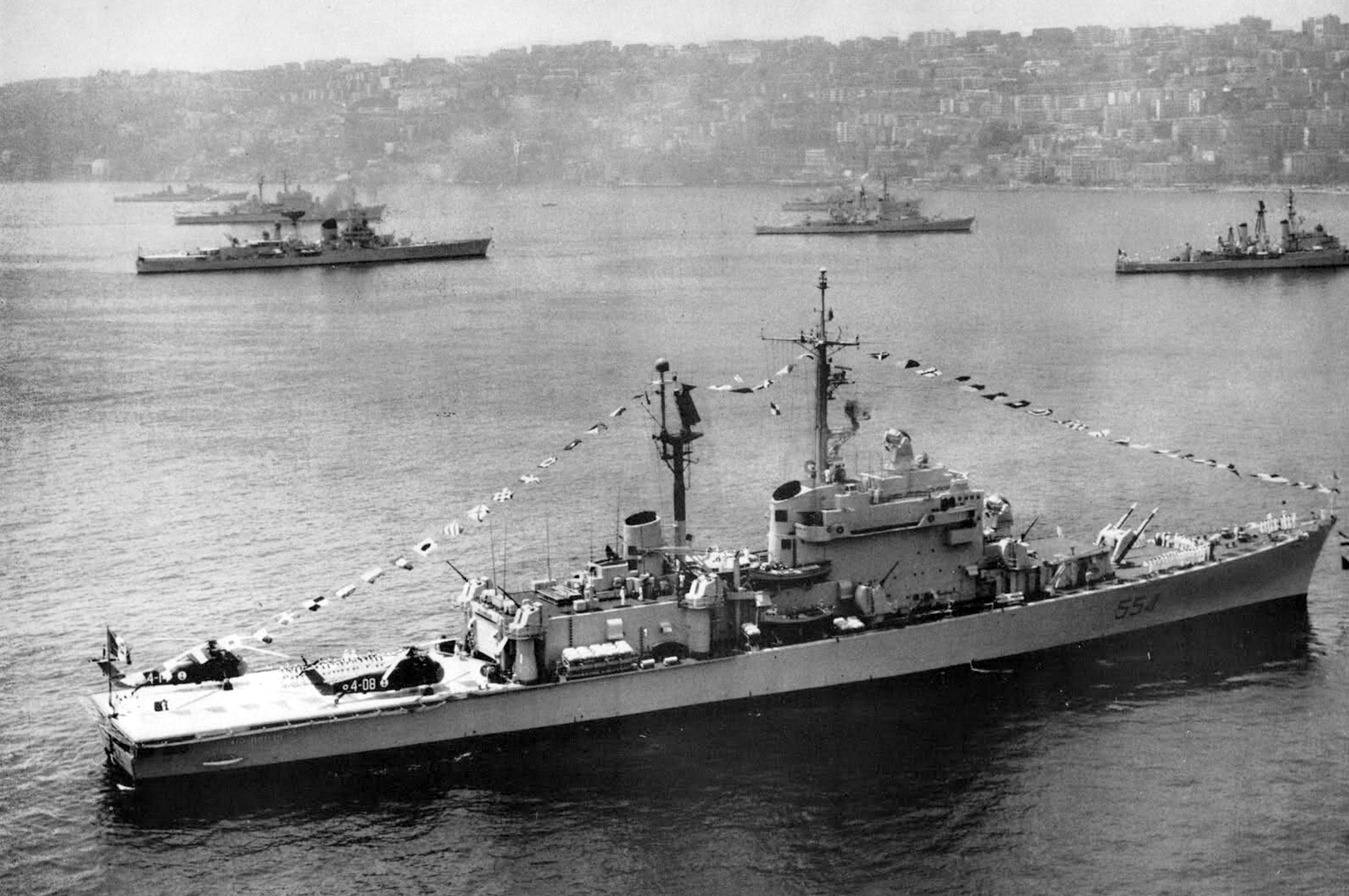
- Andrea Doria class cruiser Caio Duilio (C 554) in the Gulf of Naples during the 1968 celebrations of the anniversary of the end of WWI

Class overview
- Name: Andrea Doria class
- Builders: Navalmeccania, Castellammare di Stabia shipyard; Cantieri Navali Riuniti
- Operators: Italian Navy
- Preceded by: Giuseppe Garibaldi
- Succeeded by: Vittorio Veneto class
- Built: 1958–1964
- In commission: 1964–1992
- Planned: 3
- Completed: 2
- Canceled: 1
- Retired: 2

General characteristics
- Type: Helicopter cruiser
- Displacement: 5,000 tons (standard); 6,500 tons (loaded)
- Length: 149.3 m (490 ft)
- Beam: 17.3 m (57 ft)
- Draught: 5.0 m (16.4 ft)
- Propulsion: 2 shaft geared turbines; 4 Foster Wheeler boilers, 60,000 hp (45,000 kW)
- Speed: 31 kn (57 km/h; 36 mph)
- Range: 6,000 nmi (11,000 km; 6,900 mi) at 20 kn (37 km/h; 23 mph)
- Complement: 485
- Armament: 1 × Mk 10 twin-arm launcher with 40 RIM-2 Terrier SAM; Oto Melara 8 × 76 mm/62 MMI gun (with 8,001 ammunitions); 2 × 324 mm triple torpedo tubes (with 12 Mk 46 torpedoes + 18 Mk 46 torpedoes for helos)
- Aircraft carried: 4 helicopters

The Andrea Doria class were helicopter cruisers of the Italian Navy. Italy's first major new designs of the post–World War II era, these ships were primarily designed for anti-submarine warfare tasks. The two ships that were constructed, Andrea Doria and Caio Duilio served until 1991 in both active and training capacities. A planned third ship, Enrico Dandolo (C555), was cancelled in favor of the larger follow-on Vittorio Veneto class.

== Design ==
Ordered in the 1957-58 Naval Programme, the Andrea Doria class were designed to operate the RIM-2 Terrier surface-to-air missile (SAM) system and Sikorsky SH-3 Sea King helicopters as both a platform for anti-air and anti-submarine warfare. The hull was based on the Impavido class, with a length of 149.3 metres (489 ft 10 in) and an enlarged beam to allow for the installation of a flight deck and hangar, measuring 17.3 metres (56 ft 9 in). The vessels had a draught of 5.0 m (16 ft 5 in) and displaced 5,000 tons standard and 6,500 tons loaded.

The flight deck measured 30 by 16 metres (98 by 52 ft) and was placed aft of the superstructure. It was cantilevered out at the stern to provide extra operational space.

=== Power and propulsion ===
The class was powered by four Foster Wheeler boilers. These provided the power to two double reduction geared steam-powered turbines creating 60,000 horsepower (45,000 kW) which drove two shafts. This gave the cruisers a maximum speed of 31 knots (57 km/h; 36 mph) and an operating range of 6,000 nautical miles (11,000 km; 6,900 mi) at 20 knots (37 km/h; 23 mph).

=== Armament ===
For anti-air warfare the Andrea Dorias were equipped with one Mk 10 twin-arm launcher with 40 RIM-2 Terrier missiles placed forward. The ships were also provided with eight Oto Melara 76 mm/62 MMI guns to be used for point-blank anti-aircraft defence. The class was originally intended to be armed with the SMP 3 76 mm/62 gun found on the Albatros-class corvette, however that gun was rated poorly and was replaced. The choice to arm the cruisers with the 76 mm guns was based on a decision taken in 1958 that only guns of that size were adequate in point blank air defence. The guns were placed in six single turrets amidships abreast the funnel and the bridge.

The cruisers were also equipped with six 324-millimetre (13 in) Mk32 torpedo tubes in two triple mounts. These were for use against submarines. In conjunction with the torpedo systems, the Andrea Dorias could embark up to four helicopters. The Sea Kings were found to be too large for the class and the Italians instead chose to use Agusta-Bell AB 212 helicopters modified for anti-submarine warfare.

=== Electronics ===
Initially, the Andrea Doria class was equipped with SPS-12 and SPS-39A radars for air search and surveillance and SPQ-2 for navigation. They also carried SQS-39 sonar. The guns were automatically controlled by the Italian-designed NA-9 Orion fire control system guided by the SPG-70 radar.

== History ==
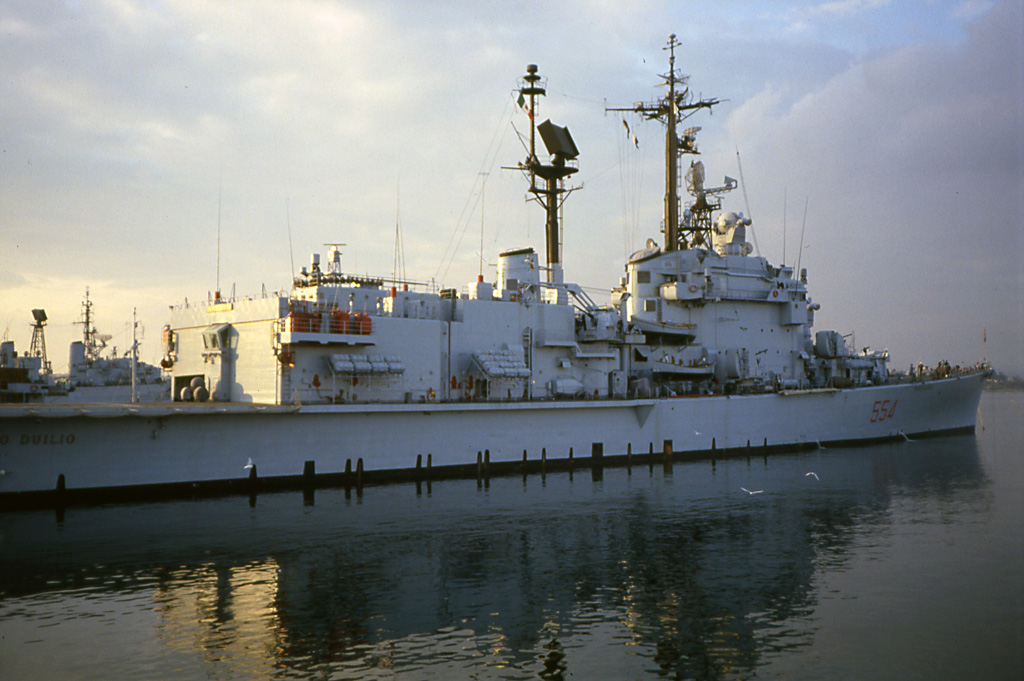
Caio Duilio in Taranto, 1985

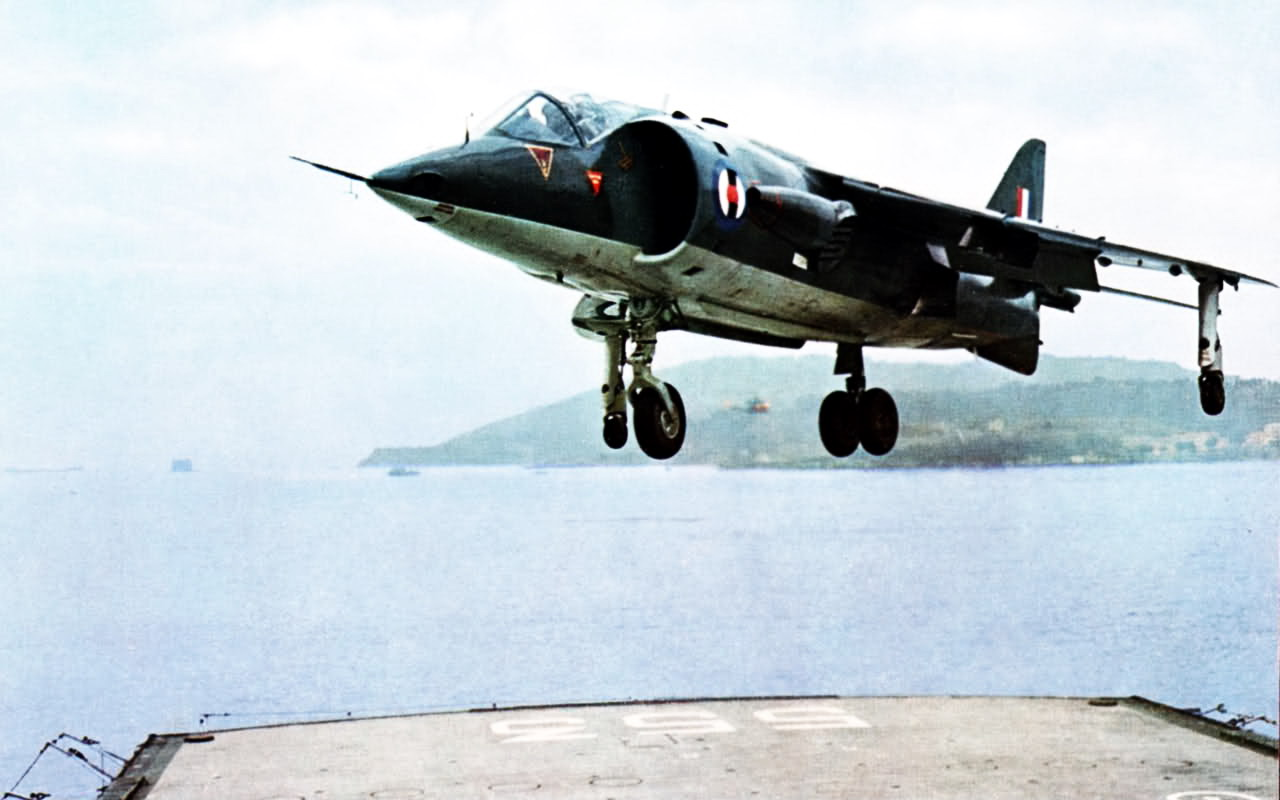
British Harrier on the Andrea Doria in 1967

As a flagship of the 1st Naval Division, the Andrea Doria participated in numerous national and international exercises. In 1967, a Hawker Siddeley Harrier of the British Royal Navy made a test landing on its aft flight deck in La Spezia. She was modernised in 1976-78, exchanging the RIM-2 missiles for the SM-1ER surface-to-air missile. The ship received an updated electronics package, mounting AN/SPS-40 2-D air search radar, SPG-55C fire control radar and SQS-23 sonar. Among other deployments, she participated in Operation Girasole, securing sea and airspace during the 1986 Libyan crisis.

Caio Duilio received only a marginal modernisation in 1979-80 and instead was modified to become a training ship. Its aft hangar was removed and replaced with classrooms and two aftmost 76mm mounts were removed. In 1980 it replaced San Giorgio as the fleet's training vessel. Both ships mounted new electronic warfare packages, SPS-768 long-range search radars and SPR-4 intercept and SLQ-D jammers. In 1984, she sailed to Los Angeles for the 1984 Summer Olympics.

== Ships ==
Andrea Doria-class cruisers
Name	Pennant number	Hull number	Builder	Laid down	Launched	Commissioned	Fate
Andrea Doria	C 553	248	CNR, Riva Trigoso	11 May 1958	27 February 1963	23 February 1964	Stricken 1991
Caio Duilio	C 554	629 (777)	Castellammare di Stabia	16 May 1958	22 December 1962	30 November 1964	Stricken 1991
Enrico Dandolo	C 555	Cancelled					

== Similar ships ==
- Moskva-class helicopter carrier
- French cruiser Jeanne d'Arc

== Sources ==
- Gardiner, Robert; Chumbley, Stephen & Budzbon, Przemysław (1995). Conway's All the World's Fighting Ships 1947-1995. Annapolis, Maryland: Naval Institute Press. ISBN 1-55750-132-7.
- John Moore, ed. (1981). Jane's Fighting Ships, 1981-1982. New York: Jane's Information Group. ISBN 0-531-03977-3.
