= List of ship decommissionings in 1947 =

The list of ship decommissionings in 1947 includes a chronological list of all ships decommissioned in 1947. In cases where no official decommissioning ceremony was held, the date of withdrawal from service may be used instead. For ships lost at sea, see list of shipwrecks in 1947 instead.

	Operator	Ship	Class and type	Fate	Other notes
7 January	United States Navy	Colorado	Colorado-class battleship	Scrapped	Reserve until stricken in 1959
8 January	United States Navy	Suwannee	Sangamon-class escort carrier	Scrapped	Reserve until stricken in 1959
9 January	United States Navy	Bon Homme Richard	Essex-class aircraft carrier	Reserve	Recommissioned in 1951
9 January	United States Navy	Essex	Essex-class aircraft carrier	Reserve	Recommissioned in 1951
9 January	United States Navy	Ticonderoga	Essex-class aircraft carrier	Reserve	Recommissioned in 1954
9 January	United States Navy	Yorktown	Essex-class aircraft carrier	Reserve	Recommissioned in 1953
13 January	United States Navy	Belleau Wood	Independence-class light aircraft carrier	Transferred to France in 1951	Renamed Bois Belleau
13 January	United States Navy	Cowpens	Independence-class light aircraft carrier	Scrapped	Reserve until stricken in 1959
15 January	United States Navy	Hornet	Essex-class aircraft carrier	Reserve	Recommissioned in 1953
17 January	United States Navy	Windham Bay	Casablanca-class escort carrier	Reserve	Transferred to Military Sea Transportation Service in 1951
January	United States Navy	Bunker Hill	Essex-class aircraft carrier	Scrapped	Reserve until stricken in 1972
11 February	United States Navy	Bataan	Independence-class light aircraft carrier	Reserve	Recommissioned in 1950
11 February	United States Navy	Cabot	Independence-class light aircraft carrier	Reserve	Recommissioned in 1948
11 February	United States Navy	Langley	Independence-class light aircraft carrier	Transferred to France in 1951	Renamed Lafayette (R96)
11 February	United States Navy	Monterey	Independence-class light aircraft carrier	Reserve	Recommissioned in 1950
14 February	United States Navy	Tennessee	Tennessee-class battleship	Scrapped	Reserve until stricken in 1959
14 February	United States Navy	California	Tennessee-class battleship	Scrapped	Reserve until stricken in 1959
15 February	United States Navy	Lake Champlain	Essex-class aircraft carrier	Reserve	Recommissioned in 1952
17 February	United States Navy	Franklin	Essex-class aircraft carrier	Scrapped	Stricken in 1964
17 February	United States Navy	Wasp	Essex-class aircraft carrier	Reserve	Recommissioned in 1951
18 February	Royal Navy	Newark	Town-class destroyer	Scrapped	
18 February	Royal Navy	Newport	Town-class destroyer	Scrapped	
21 February	United States Navy	Mission Bay	Casablanca-class escort carrier	Scrapped	Reserve until stricken in 1958
1 March	United States Navy	San Jacinto	Independence-class light aircraft carrier	Scrapped	Reserve until stricken in 1970
9 March	United States Navy	Hancock	Essex-class aircraft carrier	Reserve	Recommissioned in 1954
22 March	United States Navy	Intrepid	Essex-class aircraft carrier	Reserve	Recommissioned in 1954
9 May	United States Navy	Hollandia	Casablanca-class escort carrier	Scrapped	Reserve until stricken in 1960
30 June	United States Navy	Point Cruz	Commencement Bay-class escort carrier	Reserve	Recommissioned in 1951
July	Royal Navy	Hospital Ship No 28	Hospital ship	Returned to Southern Railway Co	Renamed Dinard, resumed ferry service in the English Channel
1 August	United States Navy	Wyoming	Wyoming-class battleship	Scrapped	
12 September	United States Navy	Saidor	Commencement Bay-class escort carrier	Scrapped	Reserve until stricken in 1970
4 October	United States Navy	Salerno Bay	Commencement Bay-class escort carrier	Reserve	Recommissioned in 1951
7 November	United States Navy	Shangri-La	Essex-class aircraft carrier	Reserve	Recommissioned in 1955
