= Spanish ship Dédalo =

Dédalo (Spanish for Daedalus) was the name of two ships of the Spanish Navy:

- Spanish seaplane carrier Dédalo was a seaplane and balloon carrier converted from German cargo ship Neuenfels in 1922
- Spanish aircraft carrier Dédalo was an aircraft carrier, initially commissioned as USS Cabot in 1943, acquired and renamed by the Spanish Navy in 1967, decommissioned in 1989
