= USS Bataan (CVL-29) =

Independence-class light aircraft carrier of the US Navy

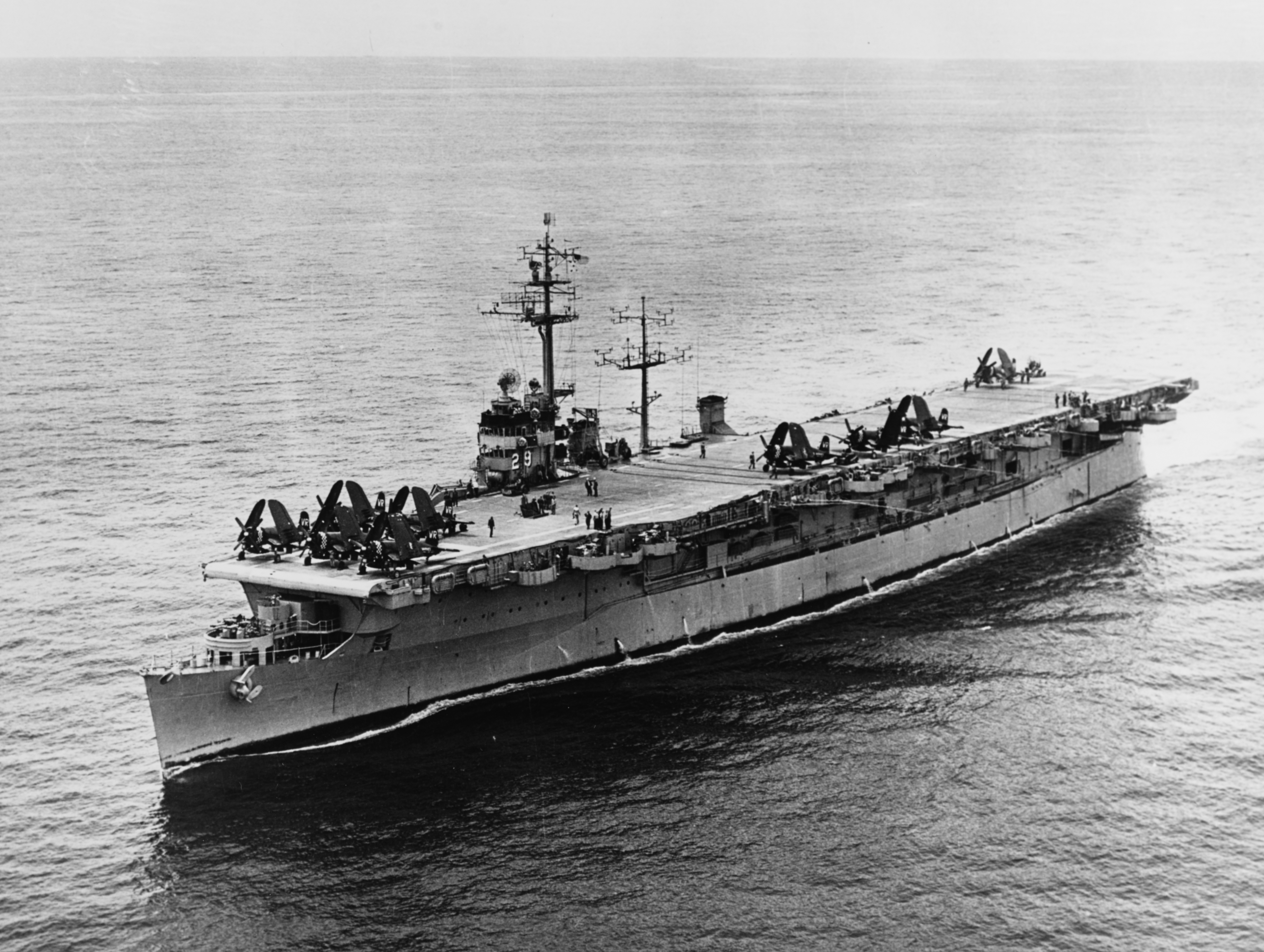
- USS Bataan preparing for her second Korean War deployment

History

United States
- Name: Bataan
- Namesake: Battle of Bataan
- Ordered: 16 December 1940 (as CL-99); 2 June 1942 (as CV-29)
- Awarded: 16 December 1940
- Builder: New York Shipbuilding Corporation
- Laid down: 31 August 1942
- Launched: 1 August 1943
- Commissioned: 17 November 1943
- Decommissioned: 11 February 1947
- Recommissioned: 13 May 1950
- Decommissioned: 9 April 1954
- Reclassified: CV-29, 2 June 1942; CVL-29, 15 July 1943; AVT-4, 15 May 1959
- Stricken: 1 September 1959
- Honors and awards: 6 Battle Stars (World War II); 7 Battle Stars (Korea)
- Fate: Sold for scrapping in 19 June 1961

General characteristics
- Class & type: Independence-class aircraft carrier
- Displacement: 11,120 long tons (11,300 t) light; 16,260 long tons (16,520 t) full load
- Length: Overall: 622.5 ft (189.7 m); Waterline: 600 ft (180 m)
- Beam: Extreme: 109 ft 2 in (33.27 m); Waterline: 71 ft (22 m)
- Draft: 26 ft (7.9 m)
- Speed: 32 kn (59 km/h; 37 mph)
- Complement: 156 officers and 1,372 men
- Armament: 26 × Bofors 40 mm guns (2×4, 9×2); 18 × Oerlikon 20 mm cannons (18×1)

USS Bataan (CVL-29/AVT-4), originally planned as USS Buffalo (CL-99) and also classified as CV-29, was an 11,000 ton Independence-class light aircraft carrier which was commissioned in the United States Navy during World War II on 17 November 1943. Serving in the Pacific Theatre for the rest of the war, taking part in operations around New Guinea, the Invasion of the Mariana Islands, the Battle of the Philippine Sea, the Battle of Okinawa, and attacks on the Japanese home islands. After World War II's end she was converted into an anti-submarine carrier and placed in reserve on 11 February 1947.

She was reactivated on 13 May 1950 at Philadelphia in order to participate in the Korean War. After the war she returned to Pearl Harbor, and reported for a preinactivation overhaul on 26 August 1953. After moving to the San Francisco Naval Shipyard, Bataan was decommissioned on 9 April 1954 and assigned to the Pacific Reserve Fleet at San Francisco. Although she was reclassified an auxiliary aircraft transport and redesignated AVT-4 on 15 May 1959, her name was struck from the Navy List on 1 September 1959. She was sold to Nicolai Joffe Corp., Beverly Hills, California, on 19 June 1961 for scrapping.

== Design and construction ==
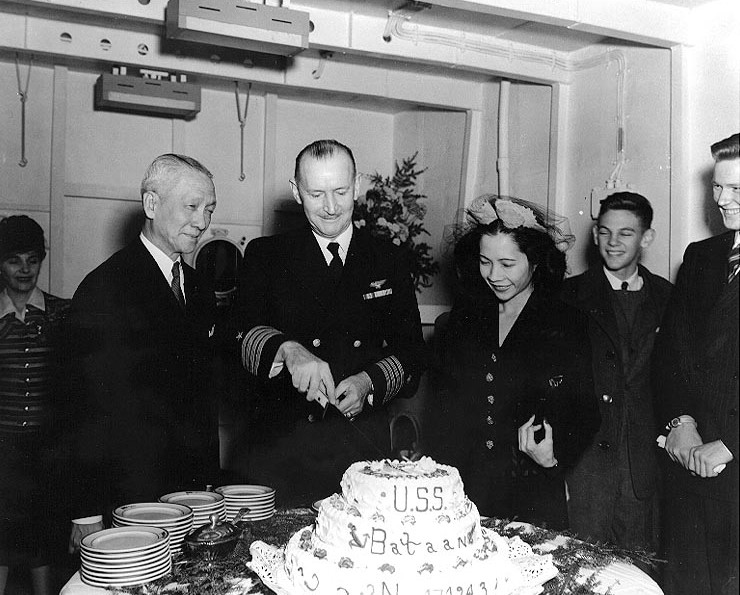
Captain Valentine H. Schaeffer, USN, the carrier's Commanding Officer, cuts the cake at a reception following her commissioning ceremonies, at Philadelphia, Pennsylvania, 17 November 1943. Looking on are Philippine Commonwealth Vice President Sergio Osmeña and Miss Rosie Osmeña.

The vessel that eventually became the light aircraft carrier Bataan was originally planned as the Cleveland-class light cruiser Buffalo (CL-99). Following the December 1941 attack on Pearl Harbor, the need for more carriers became urgent. In response, the Navy ordered the conversion of nine Cleveland-class light cruisers then under construction to completion as light aircraft carriers. These became known as the Independence-class aircraft carriers. Thus, CL-99 was reclassified CV-29 and renamed Bataan on 2 June 1942. She was further reclassified as CVL-29 on 15 July 1943.

Bataan displaced 11,000 long tons (11,000 t) light and 16,260 long tons (16,520 t) at full load. She had an overall length of 622 feet 6 inches (189.74 m) and a waterline length of 600 feet (180 m). Her extreme beam was 109 feet 2 inches (33.27 m) and her beam at the waterline was 71 feet 6 inches (21.79 m). Her draft was 26 feet (7.9 m) maximum. For armament she was equipped with 24 Bofors 40 mm gun and 22 Oerlikon 20 mm cannon for anti-aircraft protection. She normally carried 30 aircraft. Her armor consisted of 5 inches (127 mm) of belt armor, 2 inches (51 mm) on the decks, and 1/2 inch (13 mm) on the conning tower. She was powered by four Babcock & Wilcox steam boilers and General Electric geared turbines producing 100,000 shaft horsepower (75,000 kW) for her four screws. She had a design speed of 31.5 knots (58.3 km/h; 36.2 mph) and had a range of 12,500 nautical miles (23,200 km; 14,400 mi) at 15 knots (28 km/h; 17 mph). She normally carried a complement of 1569.

The vessel was ordered 16 December 1940 as a light cruiser and reordered as a light aircraft carrier on 2 June 1942. She was laid down on 31 August 1942 and launched on 1 August 1943 at the New York Shipbuilding Corporation in Camden, New Jersey, sponsored by Mrs. Corinne DeForest Murray, wife of Rear Admiral George D. Murray. She was commissioned on 17 November 1943.

Bataan was named after Bataan Peninsula and the Battle of Bataan where American and Filipino troops were besieged by Japanese forces from 24 December 1941 until 9 April 1942 when the remaining 78,000 troops surrendered to avoid unnecessary slaughter.

== Service history ==
=== World War II ===
After fitting out at Philadelphia Naval Shipyard, Bataan conducted preliminary shakedown training in Chesapeake Bay before sailing to the West Indies on 11 January 1944. Two days later, while en route to Trinidad, she suffered her first loss when a Grumman F6F Hellcat fighter crashed into her number 2 stack and burst into flames, killing three crewmen.

Returning to Philadelphia on 14 February, she underwent post-shakedown repairs and inspections until 2 March when she got underway for the Pacific. Transiting the Panama Canal on 8 March, she arrived in San Diego on the 16th. Two days later, she sailed for Hawaii with her flight and hangar decks full with passengers, aircraft and cargo. Arriving at Pearl Harbor on 22 March, she conducted a week of pilot qualification drills in preparation for "forward area deployment". The warship lost her second aircraft on 31 March when a "Hellcat" crashed the landing barrier and went over the side, although the pilot survived without injury.

Bataan departed Pearl Harbor on 4 April accompanied by her escorting destroyers and steamed to the Marshall Islands. She arrived at Majuro Atoll on 9 April and reported for duty with the fast carriers of Task Force 58 (TF 58) that same day. On 13 April, she sailed with the carriers Hornet, Belleau Wood, Cowpens and the rest of Task Group (TG) 58.1 for air operations against Hollandia, New Guinea (now known as Jayapura). These raids were intended to support American amphibious operations in the Humboldt Bay-Tanahmerah Bay region of New Guinea.

On 21 April, Bataan launched five fighter sweeps to attack Japanese aircraft and ground installations on New Guinea. The pilots claimed hits on numerous buildings, flak guns, coastal barges and three aircraft on the ground. Meanwhile, the carrier's Combat Air Patrol (CAP) shot down a Mitsubishi G4M1 Betty bomber and a Mitsubishi Ki-21 Sally.

The Task Group then headed north and struck the Japanese base at Truk Lagoon on 29 April. Bataan launched a fighter sweep and three bombing raids, with the Grumman/General Motors TBM Avenger torpedo bombers dropping 13 short tons (12 t) of bombs on the Japanese base. One TBM Avenger was shot down during the attack, but the crew was rescued by submarine Tang, which was engaged in lifeguard duty - patrolling for such survivors during the battle. On 30 April, Bataan's task group turned toward Ponape (now Pohnpei), Caroline Islands; and, the next day, she flew CAP and Anti-Submarine Patrol (ASP) missions over the battleships bombarding that island. The warships then steamed to the Marshall Islands, arriving at Kwajalein lagoon on 4 May.

==== Invasion of the Mariana Islands ====
Bataan moved to Majuro on 14 May for repairs to her forward elevator but local repair crews could not fix the problem. She sailed to Pearl Harbor for repairs and returned to Majuro on 2 June. Once there, Bataan began hurried preparations for Operation Forager, the planned invasion of the Marianas. Tasked with neutralizing Japanese airfields in the Marianas, the 15 fleet carriers of TF 58 planned to attack Saipan, Guam, and nearby island groups. They also prepared for a major fleet battle in case the Japanese carriers attempted to interfere.

Bataan joined Hornet, Yorktown, and Belleau Wood in TG 58.1 and put to sea on 6 June. Five days later, Bataan launched fighters against the Japanese base on Rota in support of operations against Saipan. One section of four F6F Hellcats flying "rescue submarine cover patrol" near that island shot down three Mitsubishi A6M Zeke carrier fighters without American losses. Another F6F Hellcat, flying CAP over Bataan, shot down a Japanese Army Nakajima Ki-49 Helen bomber. That evening, TG 58.1 sailed south toward Guam.

On 12 June, Bataan flew CAP and ASP over the task group while the three other carriers launched strikes at Orote air field on Guam. Her F6F Hellcats spotted two Japanese Yokosuka D4Y Judy bombers close to the task group and shot both down. Another attack of Rota on 13 June, Bataan aircraft concentrated on bombing Japanese antiaircraft gun positions and Piti Harbor. During recovery operations, a Curtiss SB2C Helldiver dive bomber jumped Bataan's landing barrier and damaged four aircraft. The task group sailed for the Bonin Islands on the evening of 14 June.

The task group was ordered to strike Iwo Jima and Chichi Jima in an effort to catch the airfields full of Japanese aircraft staging to the Marianas, fighter and bomber raids hit the islands on 15 June. Meanwhile, Bataan's aircraft, flying CAP and ASP as usual, bombed and heavily damaged the 1,900-long-ton (1,900 t) Tatsutagawa Maru. On 16 June, after a morning fighter sweep over Iwo Jima, the task group received reports of a large Japanese force closing the Marianas from the Philippines. The planned afternoon strikes on Iwo Jima were canceled and Bataan's task group hurried south to rejoin TF 58.

==== Battle of the Philippine Sea ====
Bataan and her task group rendezvoused with the other three fast carrier groups about noon on 18 June, approximately 150 miles (240 km) west of Saipan. On the morning of 19 June, while waiting to hear from dawn search missions, Bataan launched CAP and ASP aircraft to guard TG 58.1. At 0925, a TBM Avenger shot down a Nakajima A6M2-N Rufe seaplane fighter. Less than an hour later, starting at 1014, reports of multiple enemy raids caused the light carrier to launch all her available fighters. Over the next six hours, Bataan's fighters helped break up four major raids, disrupting the Japanese attacks. Only one enemy formation approached TG 58.1 and only one out of the 16 torpedo bombers got close enough to be shot down by antiaircraft fire from the screening ships. The light carrier also sent a TBM Avenger strike against Rota around mid-day to help suppress Japanese land-based aircraft. During the first day of the Battle of the Philippine Sea, Bataan's aircraft claimed 10 Japanese aircraft out of the approximately 300 enemy aircraft lost in the battle dubbed the "Great Marianas Turkey Shoot."

On the morning of 20 June, Bataan launched CAP and ASP as normal and steamed west as the task force prepared for a second day of battle. The enemy carriers, however, had turned toward Japan the previous evening, and American search aircraft could not find them. The only activity for Bataan's aircraft occurred at 1320 when a Hellcat splashed a lone Betty near the task group. Finally, upon hearing a sighting report at 1613, the light carrier launched 10 fighters to accompany a massive 206-aircraft strike. The raid, catching the retreating Japanese at dusk, sank Japanese aircraft carrier Hiyō and damaged another. The American aircraft then returned to their carriers, landing with difficulty in the darkness after the task force turned on its deck and search lights. Eventually, two of Yorktown′s aircraft landed on Bataan, the second of which crashed and fouled the deck. Nine of Bataan's own fighters landed on other carriers, and one was lost.

After a futile search for the Japanese carriers on 22 June, the American task force turned back toward the Marianas. On 23 June, Bataan's aircraft bombed Pagan Island, damaging the airfield and shooting down four Zekes and a Betty. That afternoon, TG 58.1 turned northwest toward the Bonin Islands, attempting to complete the attacks canceled on 16 June. Bataan launched 17 fighters for the attack on Iwo Jima at dawn on 24 June but these, and the 34 Hellcats from Yorktown and Hornet, met a Japanese incoming strike about halfway to the target. A second melee developed near the carriers when another Japanese raid met with task force's CAP. Bataan's air group lost three aircraft in these battles but claimed 25 in return. The task group then retired toward the Marshalls, anchoring at Eniwetok on 27 June.

The brief rest ended when the task group sailed back to the Bonins on 30 June. The task force's aircraft struck at Iwo Jima on 3 and 4 July, interdicting Japanese efforts to reinforce Guam. The warship's crew, however, suffered another loss on 4 July when an arresting gear cable snapped and killed one man and injured three others. In preparation for the landings planned for Guam in mid-July, Bataan's aircraft conducted sweeps over Pagan Island on 5 July and then repeatedly bombed Guam from 6 to 11 July. On 12 July, her forward elevator failed permanently and she received orders to head home for repairs. She steamed by way of Eniwetok and Oahu before arriving in San Francisco on 30 July.

==== Drydock refit and training ====
Bataan entered the naval dry docks at Hunters Point on 30 July 1944 and, over the next two months, the yard workers repaired her elevator, painted the hull, and installed a second catapult, an air-search radar, deck lighting, rocket stowage, and a second aircraft landing barrier. She got underway for Hawaii on 7 October, arriving at Pearl Harbor on 13 October.

Assigned to TG 19.5, Bataan spent the next four months preparing for operations against the Bonin and Ryukyu Islands which were the targets of invasions planned by the Americans for early 1945. Iwo Jima was needed to provide emergency airfields for B-29s bombing Japan from the Marianas and a base for their fighter escorts, while Okinawa was needed to support any future invasion of the Japanese home islands.

Bataan spent most of November and December conducting pilot training exercises and night-fighter operations in Hawaiian waters. Seven aircraft were lost in accidents, including one Wildcat that crashed into her number 2 stack but only two pilots were injured. In January and February 1945, the focus of training operations shifted to night-fighter direction and ground-attack exercises. Accidents claimed another five aircraft, including a Vought F4U Corsair fighter that burned on the flight deck on 28 January 1945, but again no pilots were lost. The carrier entered the Pearl Harbor Navy Yard on 16 February, undergoing repairs to her flight deck and receiving three new 40-millimeter antiaircraft guns.

==== Battle of Okinawa ====
On 3 March 1945, Bataan departed Pearl Harbor for Ulithi, arriving at that atoll on 13 March. There she joined Task Unit (TU) 58.2.1, an ad hoc convoy comprising carriers Franklin, Hancock, San Jacinto, two battleships, two heavy cruisers and a host of destroyers formed for the short trip back to the Fast Carrier Task Force (TF-58). The task force conducted a series of raids to support the last major amphibious operation of the war, the invasion of Okinawa. Tasked with suppressing Japanese aircraft on Kyushu, one of the Japanese home islands, fighter sweeps and bomber strikes hit airfields on 18 March and struck at Japanese naval bases at Kure and Kobe. Over the next three days, vigorous counter-attacks by Japanese aircraft were mostly broken up by CAP, although a few aircraft got through and severely damaged Franklin. Other attacks targeted Bataan, whose antiaircraft guns claimed kills on two Judys and a Nakajima B6N Jill bomber. Bataan's air group lost four aircraft in these actions while the ship's company suffered one man killed and eleven injured from shell fragments.

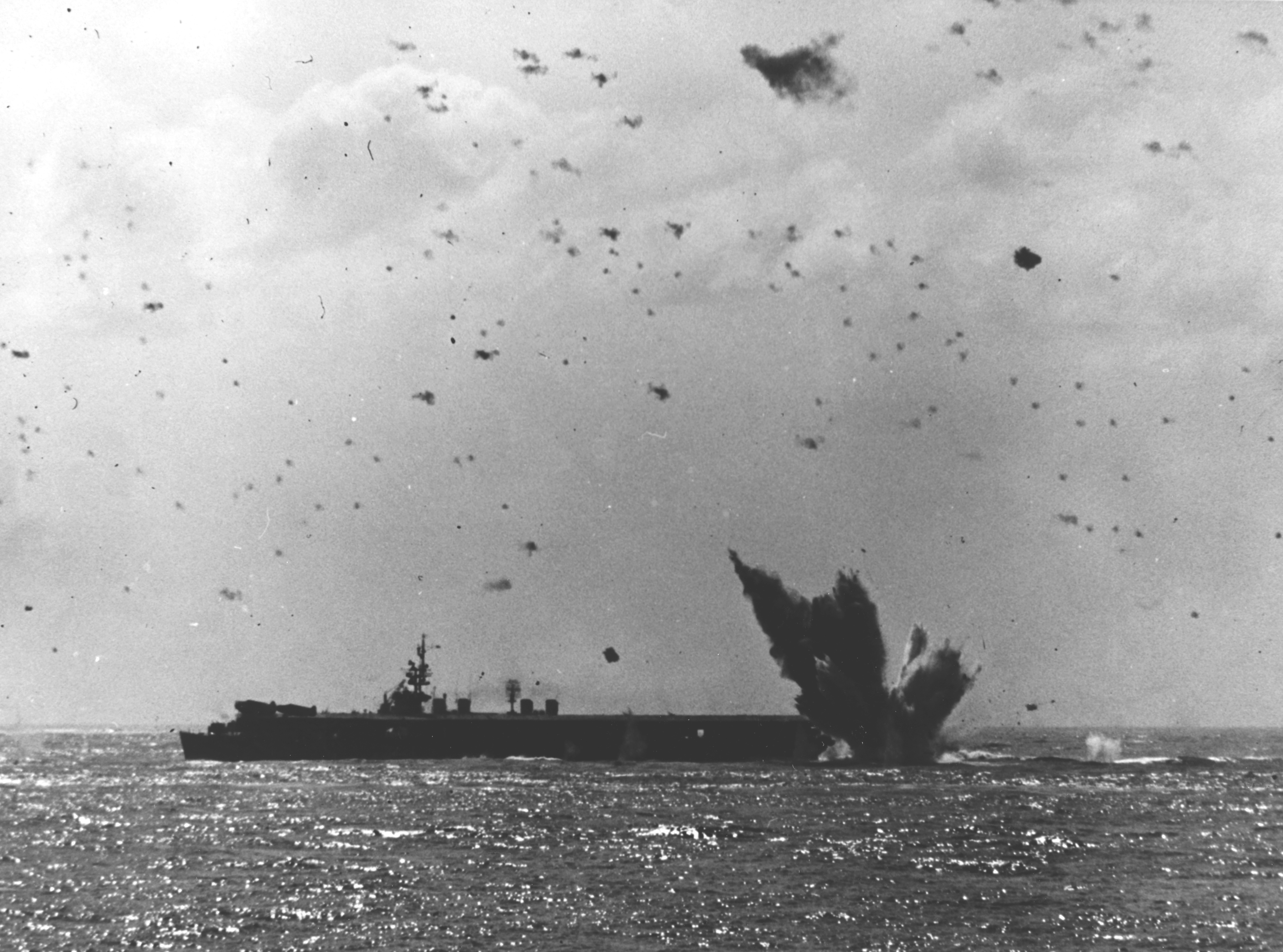
A Japanese Kamikaze crashes near USS Bataan in April 1945

Between 23 and 28 March, Bataan's aircraft struck at Kerama Retto and conducted fighter sweeps over Okinawa. She then launched a raid on Kyushu on 29 March where her fighters claimed a Judy before returning to Okinawa operations. After the amphibious landings there on 1 April, the light carrier flew CAP over the amphibious forces and began intensive air strikes in support of Marine Corps operations ashore. Her aircraft also raided southern Kyushu, where Japanese kamikazes tended to congregate before major attacks.

On 7 April, Bataan's aircraft took part in the Battle of the East China Sea, when American search aircraft spotted a Japanese task force built around battleship Yamato. Swarms of carrier aircraft attacked the Japanese force as it steamed south in an effort to disrupt the American invasion of Okinawa. Bataan's pilots claimed four torpedo hits on the giant battleship, as well as hits on a cruiser and two destroyers, that helped sink most of the Japanese task force.

Bataan spent the next 10 days alternating between CAP sweeps over Okinawa and air strikes on southern Kyushu and nearby islands. Every three days or so, she retired eastward to refuel, rearm, and replenish at sea. During four enemy attacks on the task group over this period, one crew member was killed and 24 wounded when the ship was sprayed with shell fragments.

==== Attack on Japanese home islands ====
On 18 April, Bataan launched an antisubmarine patrol that assisted in the sinking of I-56 at 26°42′N 130°38′E. Following this, her aircraft returned to several weeks of air attacks on Okinawa and Kyushu. The heaviest Japanese counter-attack took place on 14 May when eight crewmen were killed and 26 others wounded. During these April and May operations, her gunners and pilots claimed a share in dozens of kills at a cost of nine aircraft and four air crewmen. Finally, on 29 May, she steamed south to the Philippines anchoring in San Pedro Bay on 1 June.

Following a month of minor repairs to the warship and liberty for her crew, Bataan sailed in company with TG 38.3 on 1 July for the Japanese home islands. There her aircraft struck airfields in the Tokyo Bay area on 10 July, hit shore installations in northern Honshu and Hokkaido on 14 and 15 July, and helped to damage Japanese battleship Nagato in Yokosuka Harbor on 18 July. Then her aircraft struck the naval base at Kure on 24 July, helping to sink Japanese battleship Hyūga and 15 small craft in the harbor. Bad weather canceled most of her air strikes late in the month, limiting her aircraft to attacks on 28 and 30 July, and, because a typhoon passed through the area, raids did not resume until 9 August. On that day her aircraft struck Misawa Air Base in northern Japan and on 10 August they battered Aomori. She returned to Honshu on 13 August working over the Tokyo area until 0635 on 15 August 1945 when all strikes were canceled following news that the Japanese intended to surrender.

=== Post-war ===
After the formal surrender ceremony on 2 September, Bataan's aircraft air-dropped supplies to Allied prisoners of war at Zentzuji Camp in Shikoku. The carrier then steamed into Tokyo Bay on 6 September to pick up crew members ashore before departing for Okinawa that afternoon. After picking up 549 passengers there, she sailed for home on 10 September, steaming via Pearl Harbor and the Panama Canal and arriving in New York on 17 October.

Bataan then sailed to the Boston Naval Shipyard on 30 October. Following two weeks of repairs, she was converted to a troop transport in preparation for Operation Magic Carpet, the return of soldiers from overseas. Bataan sailed for Europe on 21 November and moored in Naples harbor on the 29th where she embarked 2,121 Army officers and men. Arriving at Norfolk on 8 December, the troop-carrying warship then transported 890 Italian prisoners of war back to Naples, arriving there on 23 December. The following day, Bataan steamed out of the Bay of Naples with 2,089 Army troops embarked and arrived at Norfolk on 2 January 1946.

On 10 January 1946, Bataan reported for inactivation at the Philadelphia Naval Shipyard. After conversion to an antisubmarine warfare (ASW) carrier, she was placed out of commission, in reserve, on 11 February 1947.

=== Korean War ===
In 1949, heightened international tensions between the United States and NATO on the one hand, and the Soviet Union and communist China on the other, led to increased military spending. As a result, the Navy began to expand in 1950. Bataan was recommissioned on 13 May 1950 at Philadelphia, Captain Edgar T. Neale in command. On 25 June, North Korean forces invaded into South Korea. Two days later, under United Nations (UN) auspices, the United States intervened in the conflict. Suddenly needed to train and deliver pilots and aircraft to the Korean theater, Bataan steamed for the west coast on 15 July and arrived at San Diego via the Panama Canal on 28 July.

Bataan spent the next four months conducting training operations out of San Diego. She embarked naval air squadrons for carrier landing qualifications and antisubmarine warfare exercises. On 16 November, Bataan loaded Air Force cargo and personnel and sailed for Japan. After unloading her cargo there, she sailed on 14 December to report for duty with Task Force (TF) 77 off Korea's northeastern coast.

==== First deployment ====
Bataan joined the task force at a critical juncture in the conflict. Since 24 November, when some 30 Chinese divisions had intervened in the Korean war, bitter fighting had forced UN troops to retreat from the Yalu and Taedong Rivers. By mid-December, the American and South Korean troops on the east coast had fallen back to Hungnam. The soldiers, along with their vehicles, supplies, and almost 100,000 Korean refugees, were being shipped south to the Pusan perimeter. On 22 December, Bataan began flying Vought F4U-4 Corsair fighters of Marine Fighter Squadron VMF-212 over Hungnam to help cover the final phase of this evacuation. Her aircraft, along with aircraft from the carriers Sicily and Badoeng Strait, provided air cover to ground forces and shipping in the port area. Following the end of the evacuation on 24 December, her Corsairs then flew armed reconnaissance and close air support missions over the central mountains along the 38th parallel.

On 31 December, a second communist offensive pushed south toward Seoul and Hanchon. In an attempt to stem the tide, Bataan was reassigned to Task Group (TG) 96.9 on the west coast of Korea. There, her aircraft attacked enemy troop concentrations below Seoul. After a replenishment period at Sasebo between 9 and 15 January 1951, Bataan relieved HMS Theseus in the Yellow Sea on 16 January.

Wearing the flag of Commander, Task Element (CTE) 95.1.1, Bataan's mission was to blockade the west coast of Korea. While on station, Bataan generally flew 40 sorties a day - eight defensive CAP flights with the remainder divided between close air support (CAS), armed reconnaissance (AR), and interdiction missions. For CAS of ground forces, tactical air controllers usually called in Bataan's Corsairs for bomb, rocket, and napalm attacks on known enemy positions. Daylight AR missions concentrated on halting enemy road traffic and bombing rail yards and bridges. The first patrol revealed the dangerous nature of this work when, between 16 and 26 January, VMF-212 lost three Corsairs, along with two pilots, to enemy small-arms fire.

Over the next two months, Bataan conducted three more Yellow Sea patrols. In February and March, the light carrier supported the UN counterattack toward Inchon and Seoul, concentrating her air attacks on the Chinnampo area. These flights also included air spotting missions when cruisers St. Paul and HMS Belfast fired on targets ahead of advancing UN troops. Of the three Corsairs shot down by communist antiaircraft fire during these missions, two pilots were safely rescued by search and rescue (SAR) helicopters.

On 8 April, after the fast carriers of TF 77 sailed south to Formosa to counter a perceived threat there, Bataan and HMS Theseus replaced them in the Sea of Japan. The two light carriers, screened by a pair of American destroyers and four British Commonwealth escorts, maintained the west coast blockade. Corsairs from Marine Attack Squadron VMF-312 along with British Fairey Firefly and Hawker Sea Fury fighters, bombed and strafed communist supply routes near Wonsan, Hamhung, and Songjin. Five aircraft and one pilot were lost to communist antiaircraft defenses.

After a short visit to Sasebo between 16 and 20 April, Bataan resumed her alternating patrols with HMS Theseus off the west coast of Korea. On 21 April, in an unusual incident, two Corsairs of VMF-312 were attacked by four Russian-made Yakovlev Type 3U Yak fighters near Chinnampo. Marine Corps Capt. Philip C. DeLong shot down two of the Yaks, and heavily damaged a third, while 1st Lt. Harold D. Daigh, USMCR, shot down the fourth. According to Capt. DeLong, the North Korean pilots "were considerably inferior in flying ability to the Japanese of World War II."

The following day, 22 April, communist troops began another heavy attack toward Seoul, and Bataan's aircraft flew 136 close air support sorties against them over the next four days. After a brief period of replenishment and upkeep at Sasebo between 27 and 30 April, Bataan returned to the Yellow Sea on 1 May. In company with the British carrier HMS Glory, she launched 244 offensive sorties against enemy troop concentrations, helping to stall and then reverse the communist offensive by 10 May. Later in the month, Bataan's Corsairs concentrated on the destruction of junks and sampans in the Taedong Gang estuary until bad weather canceled flight operations. During these strikes, one pilot and aircraft was lost after being hit by 40-millimeter ground fire east of Anak.

Relieved on 3 June by a British carrier, Bataan offloaded the aircraft and personnel of VMF-312 and proceeded for home via Japan, eventually mooring in San Diego harbor on 25 June. Following two weeks of rest and recreation for her crew, Bataan steamed to Bremerton, Washington, on 9 July for an extensive overhaul at the Puget Sound Naval Shipyard. When those repairs were complete, Bataan steamed to San Diego on 7 November for underway refresher training. Over the next 10 weeks, she conducted carrier landing qualifications and ASW exercises in preparation for a second deployment to the Far East.

==== Second deployment ====
Bataan got underway for Yokosuka on 27 January 1952, arriving in Tokyo Bay on 11 February after weathering a severe winter storm. There she embarked Scouting Squadron 25 (VS-25) and steamed south to Buckner Bay, Okinawa, for ASW exercises. Between 24 February and 12 April, Bataan conducted three "hunter-killer" antisubmarine warfare exercises in the waters around Okinawa. Intended to prepare Allied forces to fight the Soviet submarine fleet in the event of Soviet intervention in Korea, these exercises pitted Bataan's aircraft, including helicopters, against "enemy" submarines Blackfin, Caiman, and Greenfish.

After refueling and replenishing at Yokosuka and Sasebo, the light carrier embarked VMA-312 at Kobe and departed Japan for operations off Korea on 29 April. She relieved HMS Glory as CTE-95.1.1 that same day and began combat sorties the following day. Ever since June 1951, the war in Korea had been bogged down in a military stalemate, with both sides heavily dug in along the 38th parallel. Tasked with interdicting communist supply routes between Hanchon and Yonan, Bataan's aircraft flew 30 offensive sorties a day, bombing supply dumps, railway tracks, bridges, and road traffic.

Her only aircraft loss of this line tour took place on 22 May when a Corsair was shot down by ground fire north of Pyongyang. While two other fighters provided cover, the pilot was rescued by an Air Force helicopter. That same day, another Corsair ejected a hung rocket while landing on Bataan. The rocket bounced forward on the flight deck and exploded, injuring three crewmen. She suffered no other losses that month and on 28 May she was relieved by HMS Ocean. After sailing to Yokosuka for repairs to her flight deck, Bataan conducted three more Yellow Sea line tours in June and July, continuing the task of attacking communist supply lines. On 4 August, the warship turned for home and arrived in San Diego, via Pearl Harbor, on 26 August.

Bataan entered the Long Beach Naval Shipyard on 11 September for an overhaul, remaining there for three weeks. She then conducted two weeks of carrier qualification landings with VS-21, VS-23, and VS-871 until she began preparations for her third Far Eastern deployment. The warship steamed for Okinawa on 28 October, via Pearl Harbor, and anchored in Buckner Bay on 15 November.

==== Third deployment ====
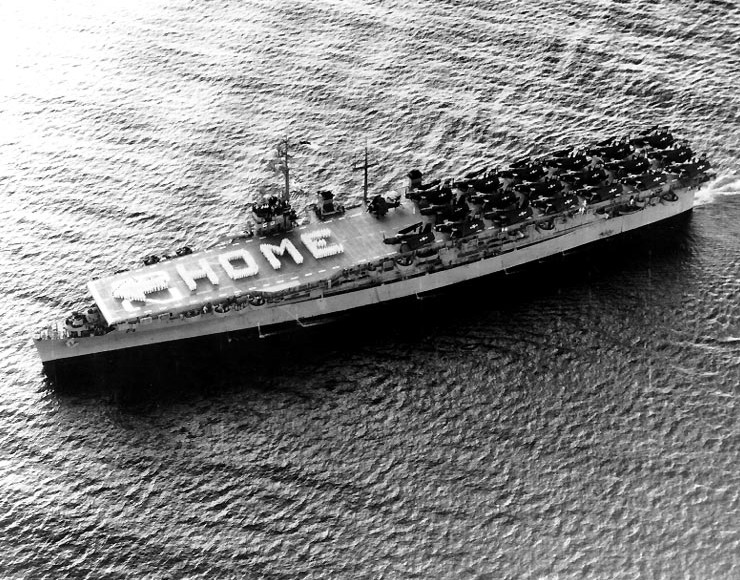
Bataan headed for home the final time on 22 May 1953

Although fears of Soviet intervention in Korea had diminished, ASW exercises remained important to the units operating off Korea. Bataan conducted two such operations, one between 23 and 29 November 1952 and another between 17 and 23 December. The first operation included an "opposed" sortie against Sea Devil and Scabbardfish, "hunter-killer" submarine searches, and general ASW patrols. She also practiced jet aircraft tracking with North American F-86 Sabre fighters operating out of Kadena airfield in Japan. The second exercise included electronic counter-measure (ECM) intercept exercises against Segundo and long-range ASW training with Lockheed P2V Neptunes.

On 9 February 1953, after two more transit ASW exercises between Buckner Bay and Yokosuka, Bataan embarked VMA-312 for operations off Korea. She relieved HMS Glory as Commander, Task Unit (CTU) 95.1.1 on the 15th and began flying combat missions that same day. In addition to the usual armed reconnaissance patrols along the coast, her Marine Corps Corsairs attacked Chinese troop concentrations south of Chinnampo and on the Ongjin peninsula. These attacks were ordered because friendly partisan reports indicated Chinese troops were massing for attacks on UN-controlled islands close to the mainland.

Bataan conducted four more line tours between 7 March and 5 May. Despite the bad flying weather associated with the spring thaw, VMA-312 continued to attack the enemy troop concentrations and supply dumps reported by friendly partisans. The Corsairs also attacked roads, railways, and especially bridges, as flood waters hampered communist repair efforts.

After liberty at Yokosuka, Bataan sailed for home, via Pearl Harbor, on 10 May, arriving in San Diego on 26 May. She was undergoing repairs there on 27 July when the armistice was signed at Panmunjom in Korea. She then loaded aircraft and equipment destined for Japan and sailed on 31 July for a round-trip voyage to Kobe and Yokosuka.

Bataan was the only Independence class aircraft carrier to participate in combat operations during the Korean War.

=== Decommissioning and scrapping ===
Returning to Pearl Harbor, she reported for a preinactivation overhaul on 26 August 1953. After moving to the San Francisco Naval Shipyard, Bataan was decommissioned on 9 April 1954 and assigned to the Pacific Reserve Fleet at San Francisco. Although she was reclassified an auxiliary aircraft transport and redesignated AVT-4 on 15 May 1959, her name was struck from the Navy List on 1 September 1959. She was sold to Nicolai Joffe Corp., Beverly Hills, California, on 19 June 1961 for scrapping.

== Awards ==

Asiatic-Pacific Campaign Medal with six battle stars
World War II Victory Medal	Navy Occupation Service Medal with Asia clasp	National Defense Service Medal
Korean War Service Medal with seven battle stars	Republic of Korea Presidential Unit Citation	United Nations Korea Medal
