= Spanish aircraft carrier Dédalo =

1967 Spanish Navy Independence-class light aircraft carrier

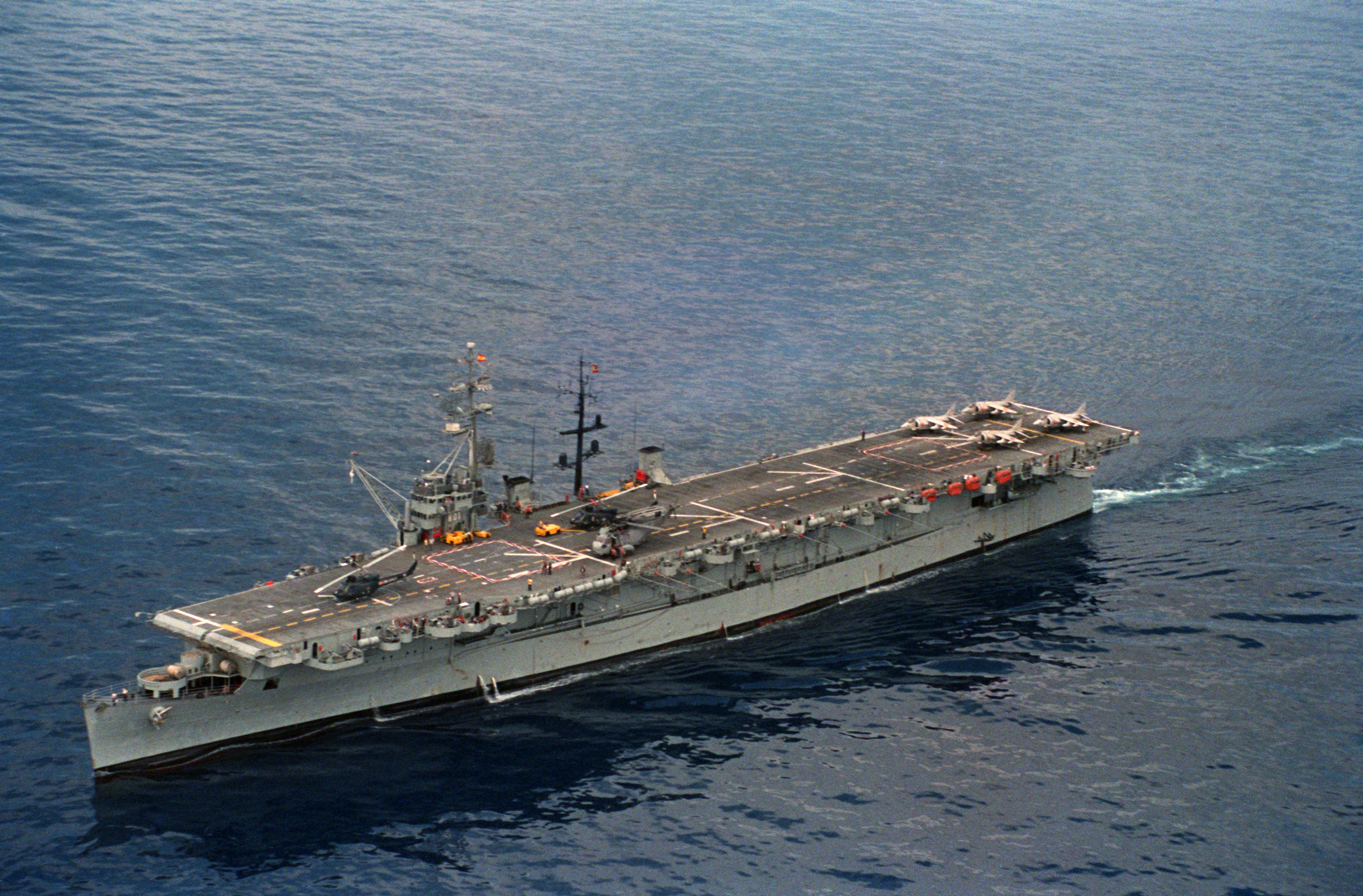
- Dédalo at sea on 1 June 1988

History

Spain
- Name: Dédalo
- Laid down: 16 March 1942
- Launched: 4 April 1943
- Acquired: 30 August 1967 on loan; Purchased outright 5 December 1972
- Reclassified: PH-01, 30 August 1967; PA-01, 28 September 1976; R-01, 1980
- Refit: 1976
- Stricken: 5 August 1989
- Fate: Scrapped 2002
- Notes: Served in United States Navy 1943–1947 and 1948–1955 as USS Cabot

General characteristics
- Displacement: 11,000
- Length: 622.5 ft (189.7 m)
- Beam: 71.5 ft (21.8 m) (waterline); 109 ft 2 in (33.27 m) (overall)
- Draft: 26 ft (7.9 m)
- Installed power: 100,000 shp (75,000 kW)
- Propulsion: 4 × B&W boilers; 4 × General Electric steam turbines; 4 × propellers
- Speed: 32 knots (59 km/h)
- Complement: 1112
- Sensors & processing systems: SPS-6 radar
- Armament: 26 × Bofors 40 mm guns
- Aircraft carried: 8 × AV-8S; 8 × SH-3D; A total of up to 33 fixed-wing aircraft and helicopters
- Aviation facilities: Hangar: 70 m × 13 m × 5 m; Flight deck: 168 × 22 m, 2 elevators

Dédalo (Spanish for Daedalus) was the first Spanish aircraft carrier and the second aviation ship in the Spanish Navy (after the seaplane tender and balloon ship Dédalo that took part in the landings at Al Hoceima in 1925). She remained the fleet's flagship until Príncipe de Asturias replaced her. Dédalo was formerly the World War II-era light aircraft carrier USS Cabot, which was acquired from the United States in the 1960s.

== History ==
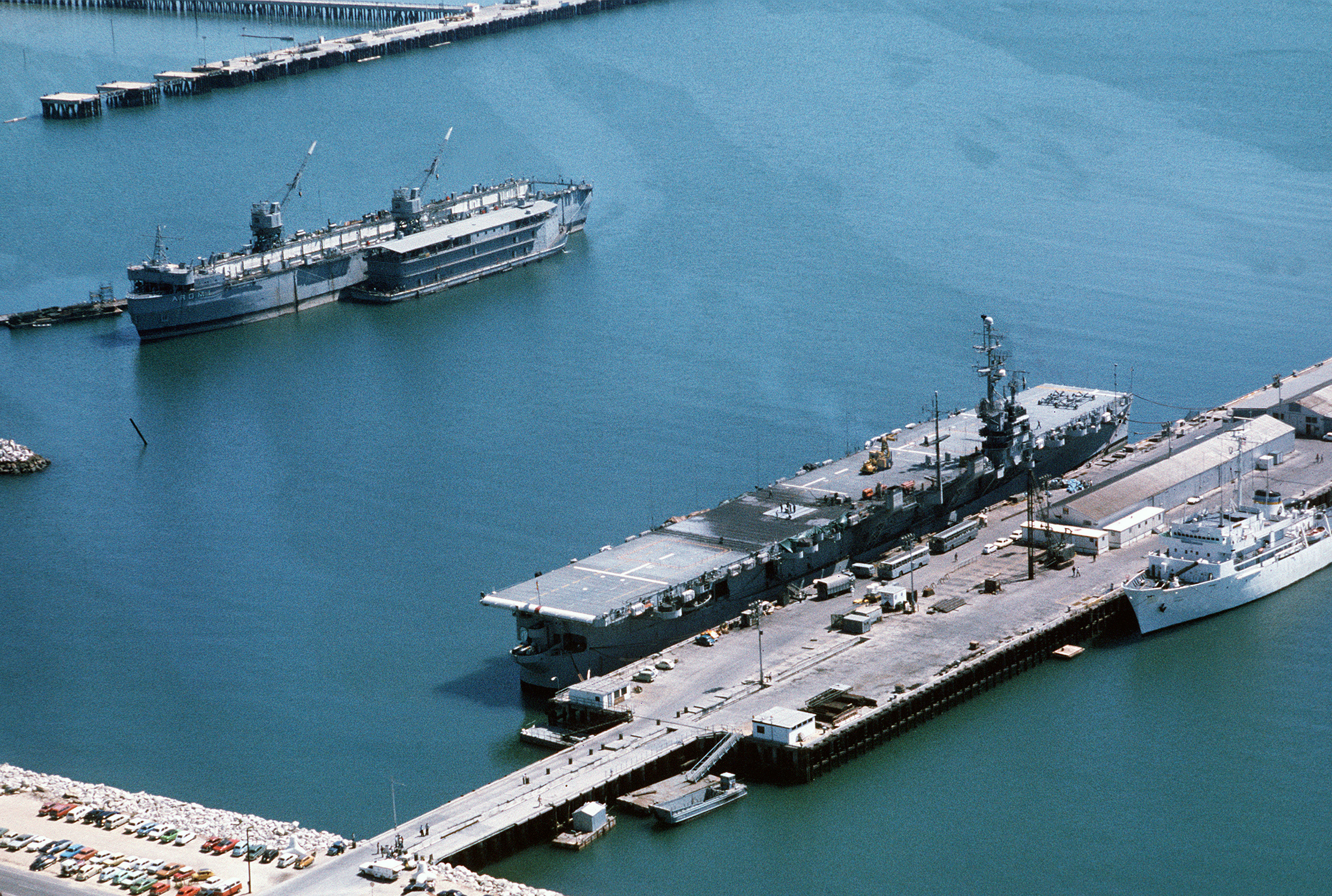
The Spanish Navy aircraft carrier Dédalo (R01) tied up at a pier at Naval Station Rota in 1976

In 1953, the Spanish government signed military agreements with the United States, which would be endorsed in the following years. The Spanish Navy studied several options to incorporate a helicopter carrier/aircraft carrier of North American design; specifically studied requesting the delivery of a Casablanca-class escort carrier (USS Thetis Bay) or an Essex-class aircraft carrier (USS Lake Champlain) or an Independence-class light aircraft carrier (USS Cabot or USS San Jacinto).

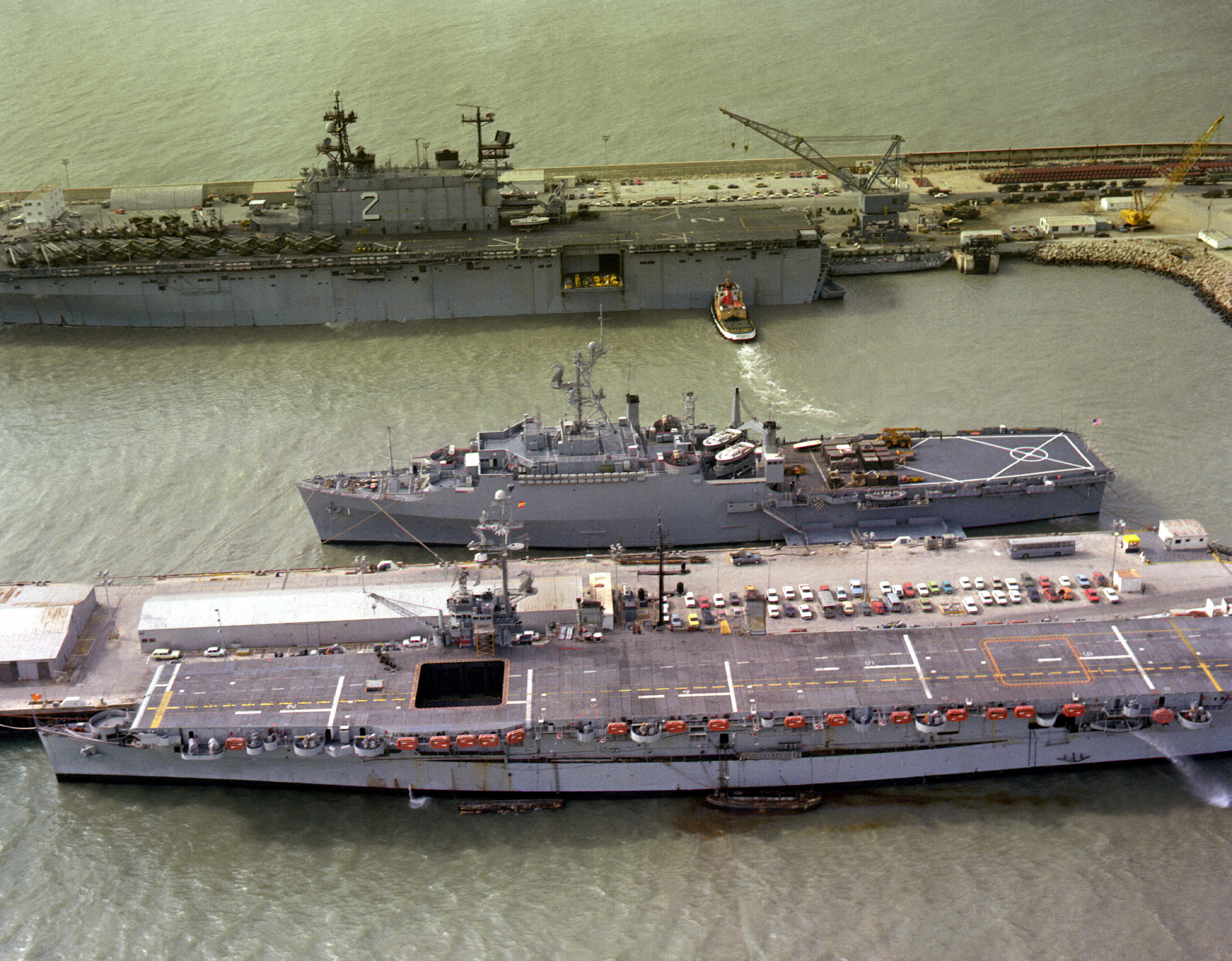
Dédalo moored in Rota in February 1982 along with the USS Raleigh and USS Saipan

Finally in 1967, after over 12 years in mothballs in the United States, Cabot was chosen and lent to Spain. The loan was converted to a sale in 1972. Dédalo initially deployed with the Spanish Navy as a helicopter-only antisubmarine warfare carrier operating the SH-3D Sea King and other helicopters from 1967 to 1976. On 8 November 1972, a Harrier was successfully tested on the Dédalo's deck, a first in the history of the plane.

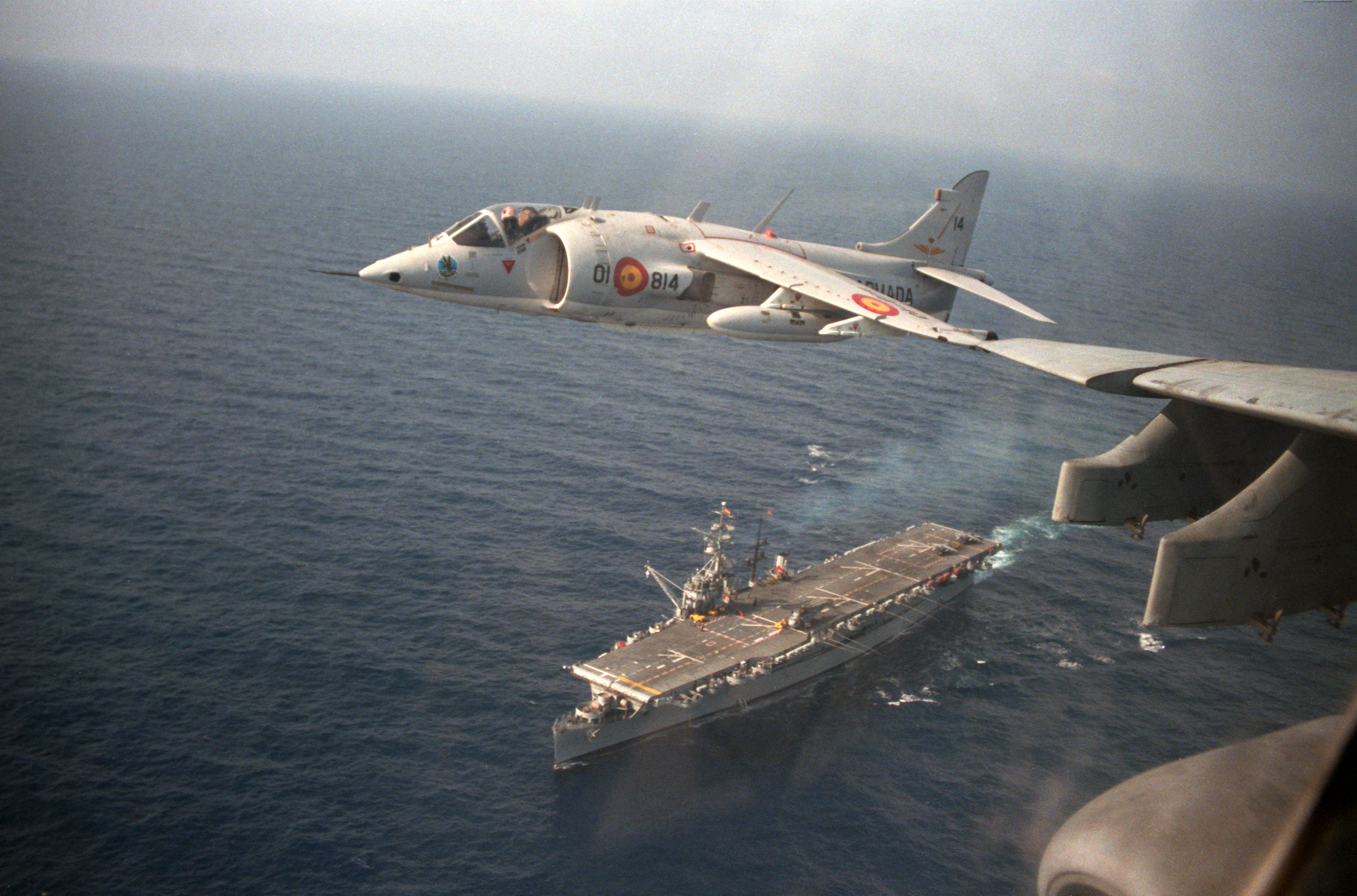
An AV-8S Matador overflies Dédalo in 1988

The Spanish Navy decided to order and deploy short-take-off-and-vertical-landing (STOVL) AV-8S Matadors (AV-8A Harrier) when Dédalo was overhauled. Since the Harriers' downdraft on vertical landing would have damaged the wooden deck, protective metal sheathing was installed on the rear area of the flight deck. The first batch of six AV-8S single-seat and two TAV-8S two-seat aircraft were delivered to the Armada Española throughout 1976. A second batch of four AV-8S aircraft was delivered in 1980. Unlike some carriers used for Harrier operations, a ski jump to assist STOVL takeoff was never installed on Dédalo, limiting the maximum takeoff weight of the Harriers.

She then typically carried an air group of eight AV-8S fighters, four Sea King ASW helicopters, and four AB 212ASW Twin Hueys although Sikorsky S-55/CH-19s, AH-1 Cobras, and other specialized helicopters from the Spanish army, air force, and navy flew from her flight deck.

During her Spanish service, Dédalo logged 1,650 days' steaming, covering 300,000 nautical miles (560,000 km), registering 30,000 landings and takeoffs, losing an AV-8A and three AB 212ASW helicopters to accidents.

== Disposal ==
Replaced by the Spanish-built S/VTOL carrier Príncipe de Asturias in 1988, the Dédalo was struck by the Spanish Navy in August 1989, and she was given to a private organization in the U.S. for use as a museum ship. However, that private organization was unable to pay its creditors, and on 10 September 1999, the ship was auctioned off by the United States Marshals Service to Sabe Marine Salvage of Rockport, Texas. The scrapping of the hulk was completed in 2002.

== See also ==
- List of aircraft carriers
