= USS San Jacinto (CVL-30) =

Independence-class light aircraft carrier of the US Navy

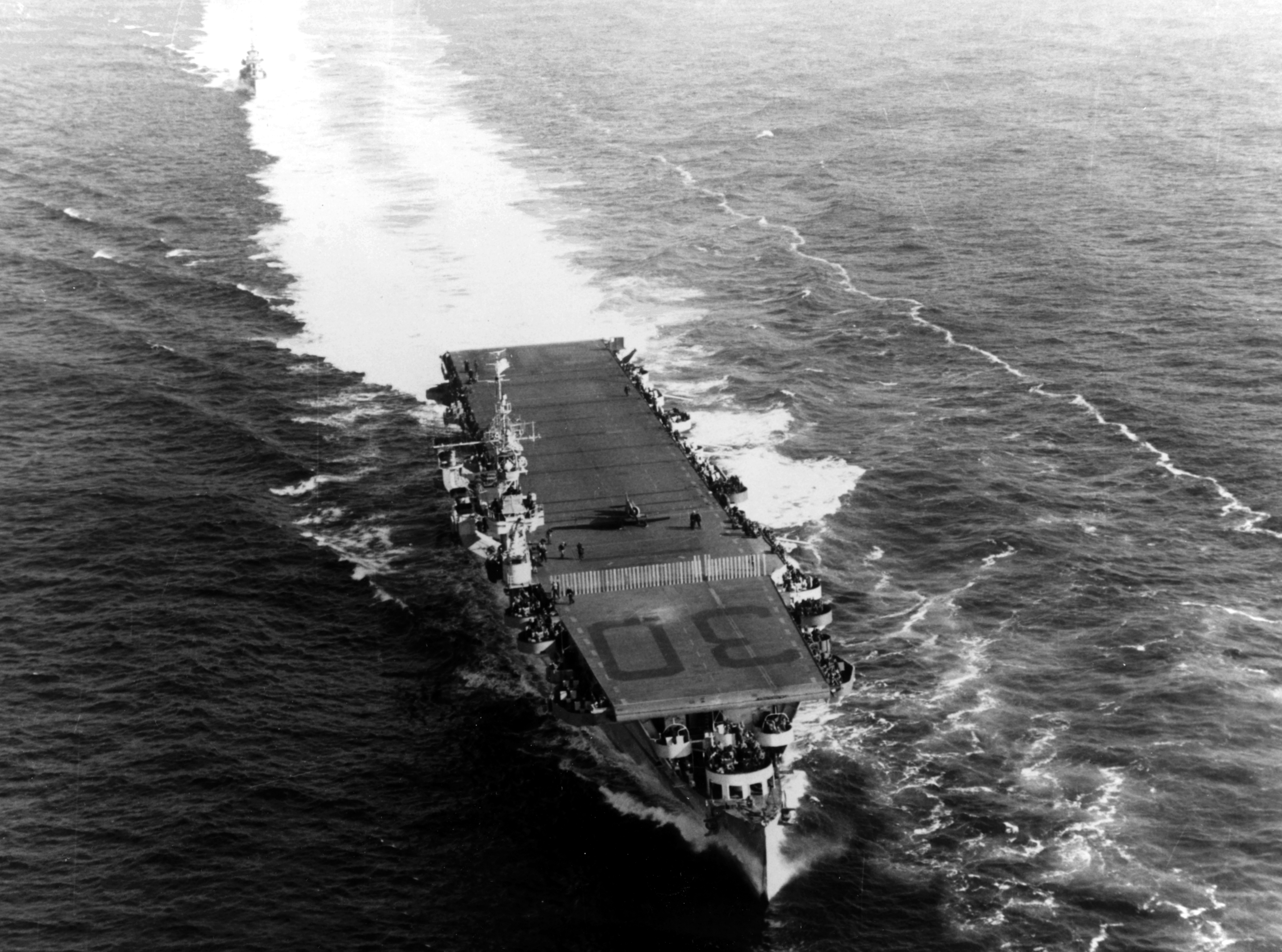
- USS San Jacinto, with destroyer escort, January 1944

History

United States
- Name: San Jacinto
- Namesake: Battle of San Jacinto
- Ordered: November 2 1941 (as CL-100); 2 June 1942 (as CV-30)
- Builder: New York Shipbuilding Corporation
- Laid down: 26 October 1942
- Launched: 26 September 1943
- Commissioned: 15 November 1943
- Decommissioned: 1 March 1947
- Reclassified: CV-30, 2 June 1942; CVL-30, 15 July 1943; AVT-5, 15 May 1959
- Stricken: 1 June 1970
- Identification: Hull number: CVL-30
- Fate: Scrapped, 15 December 1971

General characteristics
- Class & type: Independence-class aircraft carrier
- Displacement: 11,000
- Length: 622.5 ft (189.7 m)
- Beam: 71.5 ft (21.8 m) (waterline); 109 ft 2 in (33.27 m) (overall)
- Draft: 26 ft (7.9 m)
- Speed: 31.6 knots (58.5 km/h; 36.4 mph)
- Complement: 1,549 officers and men
- Armament: 28 × Bofors 40 mm guns; 40 × Oerlikon 20 mm cannons
- Aircraft carried: 45 aircraft

USS San Jacinto (CVL-30) of the United States Navy was an Independence-class light aircraft carrier that served during World War II. She was named for the Battle of San Jacinto during the Texas Revolution. Future U.S. President George H. W. Bush served aboard the ship during World War II.

== Operational history ==
Originally laid down as the light cruiser Newark (CL-100), on 26 October 1942 by the New York Shipbuilding Co., Camden, New Jersey; redesignated CV-30 and renamed Reprisal on 2 June 1942; renamed San Jacinto on 30 January 1943, converted, while building, to a light aircraft carrier and reclassified as CVL-30; launched on 26 September 1943; sponsored by Mary Gibbs Jones (wife of U.S. Commerce Secretary Jesse H. Jones); and commissioned on 15 November 1943, Capt. Harold M. Martin, in command.

After shakedown in the Caribbean, San Jacinto sailed, via the Panama Canal, San Diego, and Pearl Harbor, for the Pacific war zone. Arriving at Majuro, Marshall Islands, she joined Vice Admiral Marc Mitscher's Task Force 58/38, the fast carrier striking force of the Pacific Fleet. There, San Jacinto embarked Air Group 51, whose fighters and torpedo planes would be the ship's chief weapons in battle.

=== Marianas actions ===
After providing search patrols to protect other carriers striking at Marcus Island, San Jacinto rejoined the Fast Carrier Task Force, Task Force 58, on 21 May 1944 and was part of effective strikes against a weakened Japanese-held Wake Island on 23 May (no US troop landings occurred in this action, Wake remained in Japanese hands until their surrender); Wake Island had previously been attacked by Task Force 14 on 5–6 October 1943. These were San Jacinto's first offensive missions, and no combat casualties were incurred, but one TBF Avenger was lost and its aircrew listed as missing when it failed to return from an antisubmarine patrol.

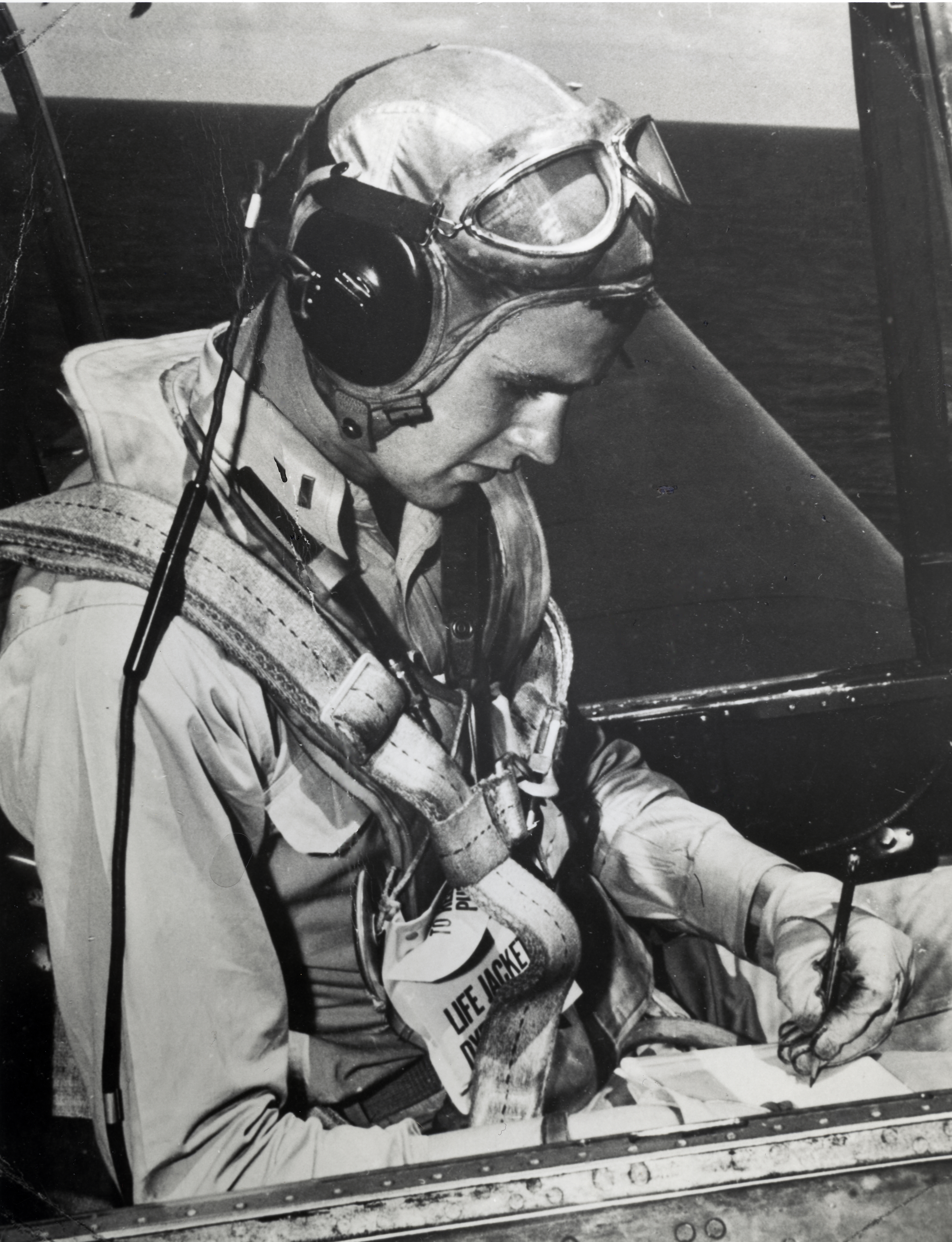
George H. W. Bush in his Grumman TBM Avenger aboard USS San Jacinto in 1944

By 5 June 1944, San Jacinto was ready to participate in the largest fleet action since the Battle of Midway, almost exactly two years before. On that day, Task Force 58 sortied from Majuro and headed toward the Marianas to conduct air strikes preparatory to American seizure of Saipan and to protect the invasion forces from enemy air and naval attack.

This American thrust triggered a strong Japanese reaction; on 19 June, the Japanese Fleet launched more than 400 planes against the invasion fleet and the covering carrier force. In the ensuing air battle, known to American pilots as the "Marianas Turkey Shoot", more than 300 enemy planes were shot down. While San Jacinto's planes were achieving their most one-sided victory of the war, her gunners helped to shoot down the few attackers able to get near the American ships. Then, at dusk, Admiral Mitscher dispatched an all-carrier attack after the retreating enemy fleet. The night recovery of the returning planes was accomplished amid considerable confusion. Reportedly, a Japanese carrier plane attempted a landing approach on San Jacinto, only to be waved off by the landing signal officer because its hook was not down.

San Jacinto then participated in strikes against Rota and Guam and furnished combat air patrol (CAP) and antisubmarine patrol (ASP) for her task group. During these raids, a San Jacinto fighter pilot was shot down over Guam and spent 17 days in a life raft trying to attract attention and 16 nights hiding on the island.

After a refueling and replenishment stop at Eniwetok Atoll, San Jacinto joined in carrier strikes against the Palaus on 15 July. On 5 August, her targets were Chichi, Haha, and Iwo Jima. A brief stop at Eniwetok preceded dawn-to-dusk CAP and ASP duty while other carriers struck at Yap, Ulithi, Anguar, and Babelthuap, pinning down Japanese air forces while the Palaus were being assaulted on 15 September.

On 2 September, while piloting a TBM-1C Avenger #46214 from VT-51, future-President George H. W. Bush was shot down by antiaircraft fire while attacking Japanese installations on the island of Chichijima. Bush for a time was considered the youngest navy pilot in history, and is known as the youngest pilot in WWII history to join an American torpedo bomber squadron. Bush completed his bombing run, then guided his crippled plane out to sea. The two other crew members were lost, but Lieutenant (J.G.) Bush parachuted into the sea and was rescued by the submarine Finback from capture by cannibalistic Japanese Officers stationed on Chichijima. For his actions in the successful attack, 20-year-old Bush received the Distinguished Flying Cross.

Following a replenishment stop at Manus, Admiralty Islands, San Jacinto joined in strikes against Okinawa and furnished photographic planes to get information necessary for future invasion plans. After refueling at sea, she once again supplied dawn-to-dusk air protection as other carriers sent strikes against Formosa, northern Luzon, and the Manila Bay area from 12 to 19 October. During operations on 17 October, a fighter plane made a very hard landing and inadvertently fired its machine guns into the ship's island structure, killing two men and wounding 24, including her commanding officer, and causing considerable damage to radar. Despite this accident, San Jacinto remained battle-worthy.

=== Philippines ===
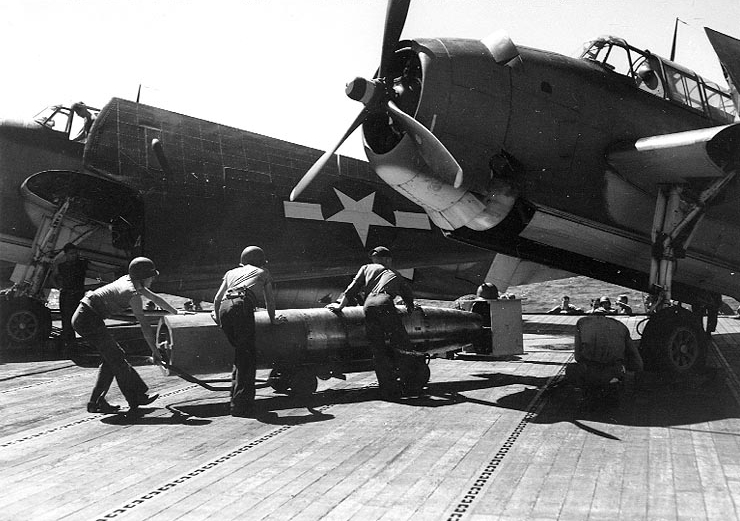
A Grumman TBM Avenger of Torpedo Squadron 51 being armed with a Mark XIII torpedo on the flight deck of San Jacinto during the Battle off Cape Engaño on 25 October 1944

As American troops landed on Leyte in the central Philippines on 20 October, San Jacinto provided close air support. On 24 October, this mission was interrupted by news of the three-pronged approach of the Japanese fleet, which precipitated the Battle of Leyte Gulf, the largest fleet battle in naval history.

San Jacinto sent planes against the central force in the Sibuyan Sea, then raced north to launch strikes against the northern force, resulting in heavy damage to the Japanese carriers and surface combatants off Cape Engaño. On 30 October, her fighters furnished air protection over Leyte while her guns shot down two planes attempting suicide attacks on the ship. After a pause at Ulithi, the carrier joined in attacks on the Manila Bay area, then took a side trip to Guam to exchange air groups, receiving Air Group 45. She received slight damage during a typhoon in December 1944.

After completing repairs at Ulithi, San Jacinto and the rest of her fast carrier force entered the South China Sea and launched massive air attacks on the airfields of Formosa and against shipping at Cam Ranh Bay, French Indochina, and at Hong Kong. By refueling and replenishing at sea, Task Force 38 was able to continue its pressure on the enemy and strategic support for the American invasion of Luzon by strikes against the Ryukyu Islands.

=== Attacks over Japan ===
Next, San Jacinto joined in the first carrier strikes against the home islands of Japan. During the raids on 16 and 17 February 1945, carrier-based aircraft shot down many enemy planes during fierce dogfights over airfields in the Tokyo area. These operations were designed to cover the imminent invasion of Iwo Jima. Next came air support for the landing marines, followed by further strikes against Tokyo and Okinawa before San Jacinto returned to Ulithi.

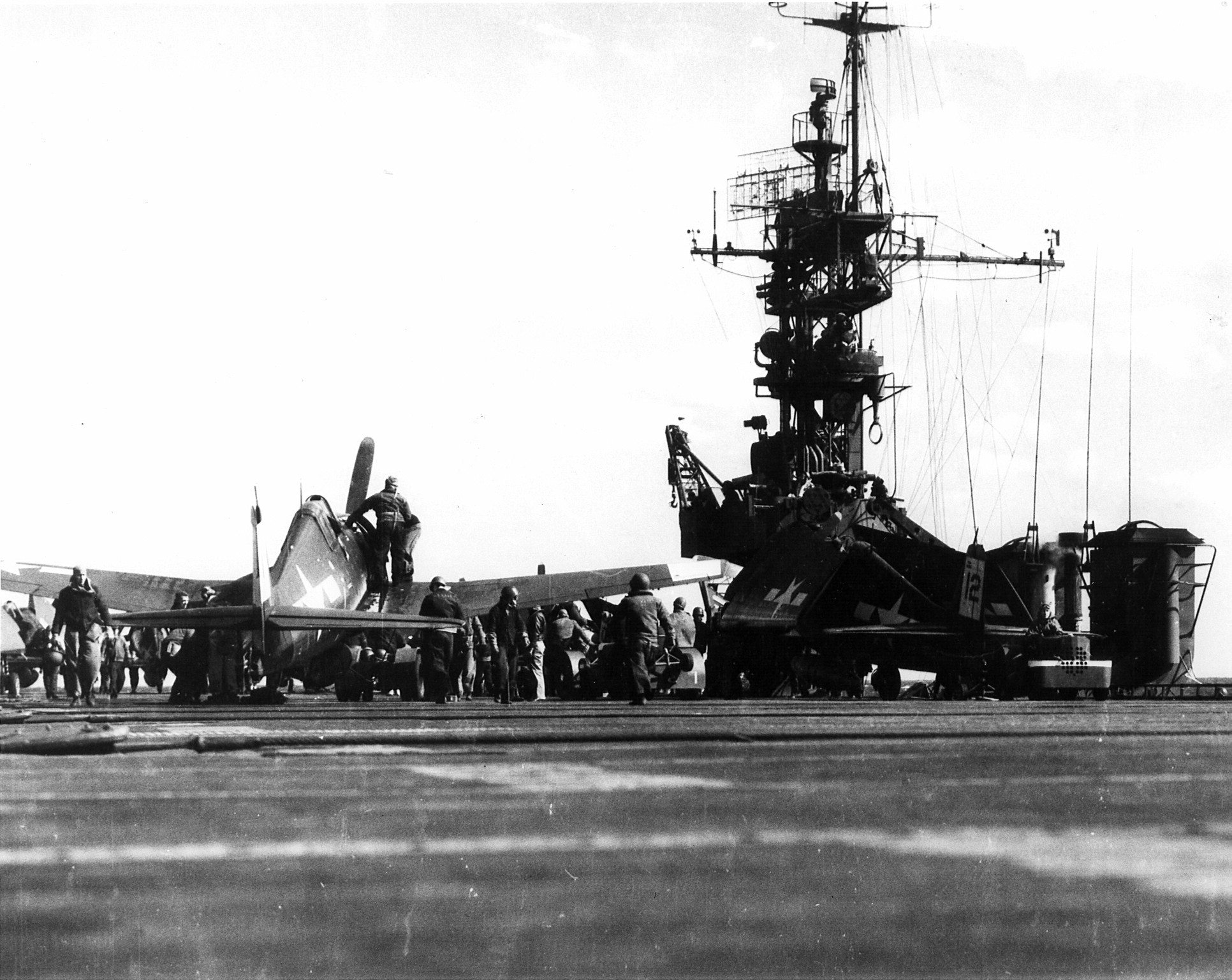
Aircraft on San Jacinto's flight deck in March 1945

While conducting operations off Kyūshū, Japan, she witnessed the conflagration on the carrier USS Franklin, and on 19 March 1945, escaped destruction when a kamikaze narrowly missed her. More massive enemy attacks came with Operation Iceberg as the carrier force furnished air support for the invasion of Okinawa. On 5 April, more than 500 planes, primarily kamikazes, attacked. Fighter planes and antiaircraft guns shot down about 300, but many got through. San Jacinto's gunners shot the wing off a would-be suicide plane, deflecting its dive; it splashed down only 50 feet off her port bow. Her mission of covering the Okinawa invasion entailed heavy air activity and kept the ship almost constantly at general quarters while supporting ground forces and repelling frequent attacks by suicide planes.

On 7 April, San Jacinto's's bombers torpedoed the Japanese destroyers Hamakaze and Asashimo, part of a naval suicide attack in which the super battleship Yamato was also sunk. San Jacinto then returned to the dangerous job of defending against the suicide plane attacks, striking at the kamikaze airfields on Kyūshū, and providing close air support for ground forces fighting on Okinawa.

On 5 June, she successfully rode out another typhoon, and after replenishing at Leyte, sortied for her final raids as part of Task Force 58. Her aircraft struck at Hokkaidō and Honshū, Japan, on 9 July and continued to operate off the coast of Japan until the end of hostilities on 15 August 1945.

After the ceasefire preceding Japan's formal surrender, her air missions over Japan became mercy flights over Allied prisoner-of war camps, dropping food and medicine until the men could be rescued. She was present at Tokyo Bay for the Japanese surrender on 2 September 1945. Her wartime mission completed, San Jacinto returned home and tied up at NAS Alameda, California, on 14 September 1945.

== Fate ==
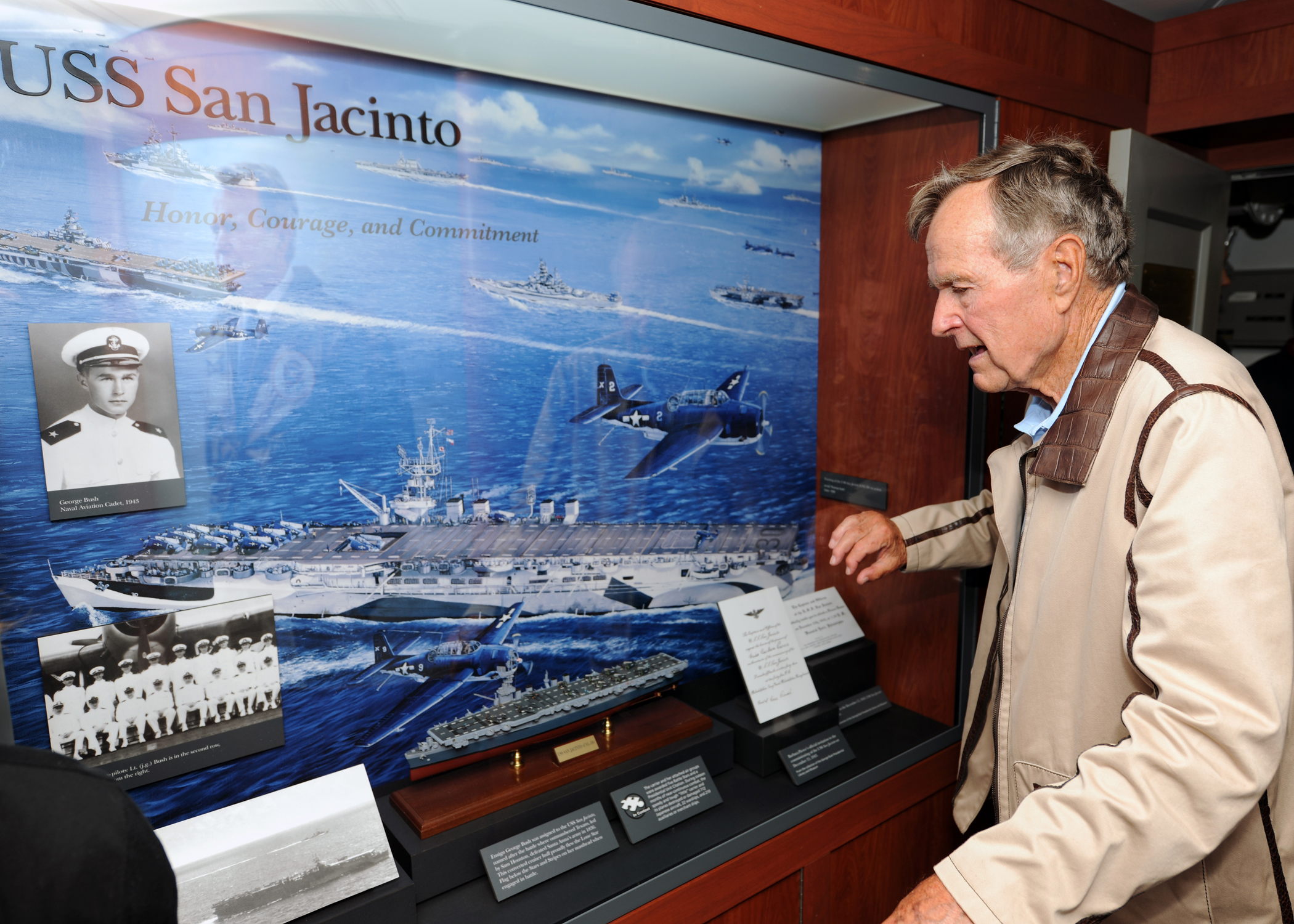
Former president George H. W. Bush with a display dedicated to USS San Jacinto on board the aircraft carrier USS George H. W. Bush in 2010

The Spanish Navy considered acquiring San Jacinto but instead chose the Independence-class carrier USS Cabot (CVL-28), which was renamed Dédalo.

San Jacinto was decommissioned on 1 March 1947 and joined the Pacific Reserve Fleet berthed at San Diego. She was reclassified as an auxiliary aircraft transport (AVT-5) on 15 May 1959, and struck from the Navy list on 1 June 1970; her hull was sold for scrapping in December 1971.

== Awards ==
- Presidential Unit Citation
- Asiatic-Pacific Campaign Medal with five battle stars (Note: San Jacinto was originally credited with five battle stars which is repeated in many sources, however, in 1954 it was realized that two battle stars (for Okinawa and Raids on Japan) had been awarded to the air group and not the ship.)
- World War II Victory Medal
- Navy Occupation Medal with "ASIA" clasp
