= Independence-class aircraft carrier =

Light aircraft carrier class of the US Navy

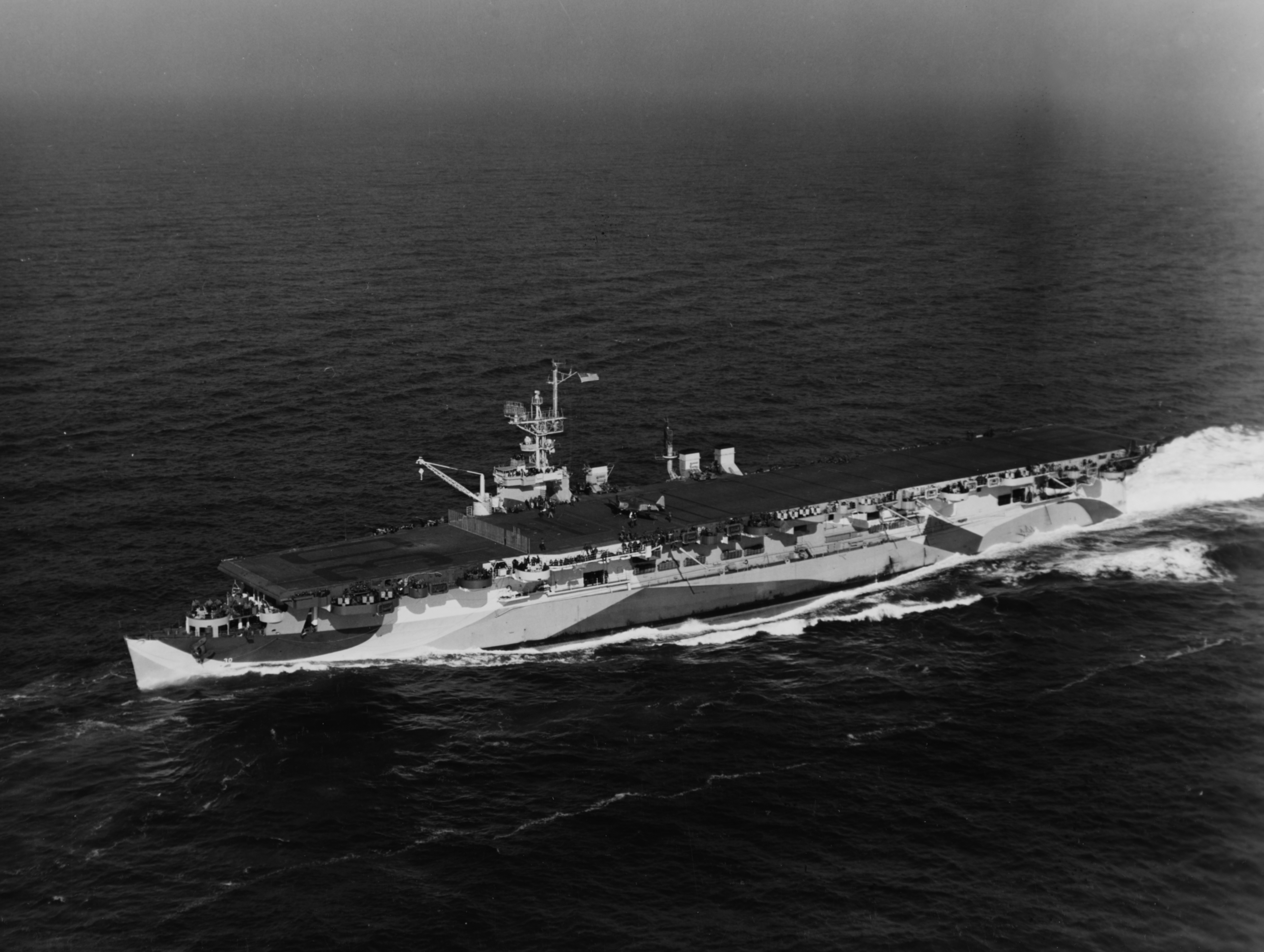
- USS San Jacinto on a training cruise off the east coast in 1944

Class overview
- Builders: New York Shipbuilding
- Operators: United States Navy; French Navy; Spanish Navy
- Succeeded by: Saipan class
- Subclasses: Cleveland-class cruiser
- Built: 1941–1943
- In commission: 1943–1960
- Completed: 9
- Lost: 1
- Retired: 8

General characteristics
- Type: Light aircraft carrier
- Displacement: 11,000 tons (standard), 14,220 design, 15,100 design full load
- Length: 622 ft 6 in (189.74 m) overall; 600 ft (180 m) waterline; 552 ft (168 m) flight deck
- Beam: 71 ft 6 in (21.79 m) hull; 109 ft 2 in (33.27 m) over flight deck and projections
- Draught: 26 ft
- Propulsion: steam turbines, 4 Babcock & Wilcox boilers, 565 PSI (850 F); four propellers; 100,000 horsepower (75 MW)
- Speed: 31.5 knots (36.2 mph; 58.3 km/h) maximum
- Range: 13,000 nautical miles (24,000 km) at 15 knots (28 km/h)
- Complement: 140 officer, 1,321 enlisted
- Sensors & processing systems: SC radar
- Armament: 26 × Bofors 40 mm guns (2 quad, 8 dual, 16 single, 10 Mk 51 directors)
- Aircraft carried: Typical operational complement as of October 1944: 24 F6F Hellcat fighters; 9 TBM Avenger torpedo bombers; 1 J2F Duck utility amphibian sometimes carried

The Independence-class aircraft carriers were a class of light carriers built for the United States Navy that served during World War II.

== Development ==
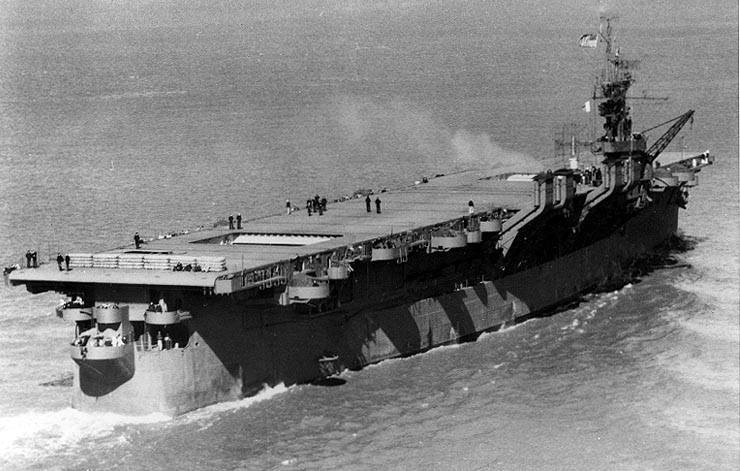
USS Princeton

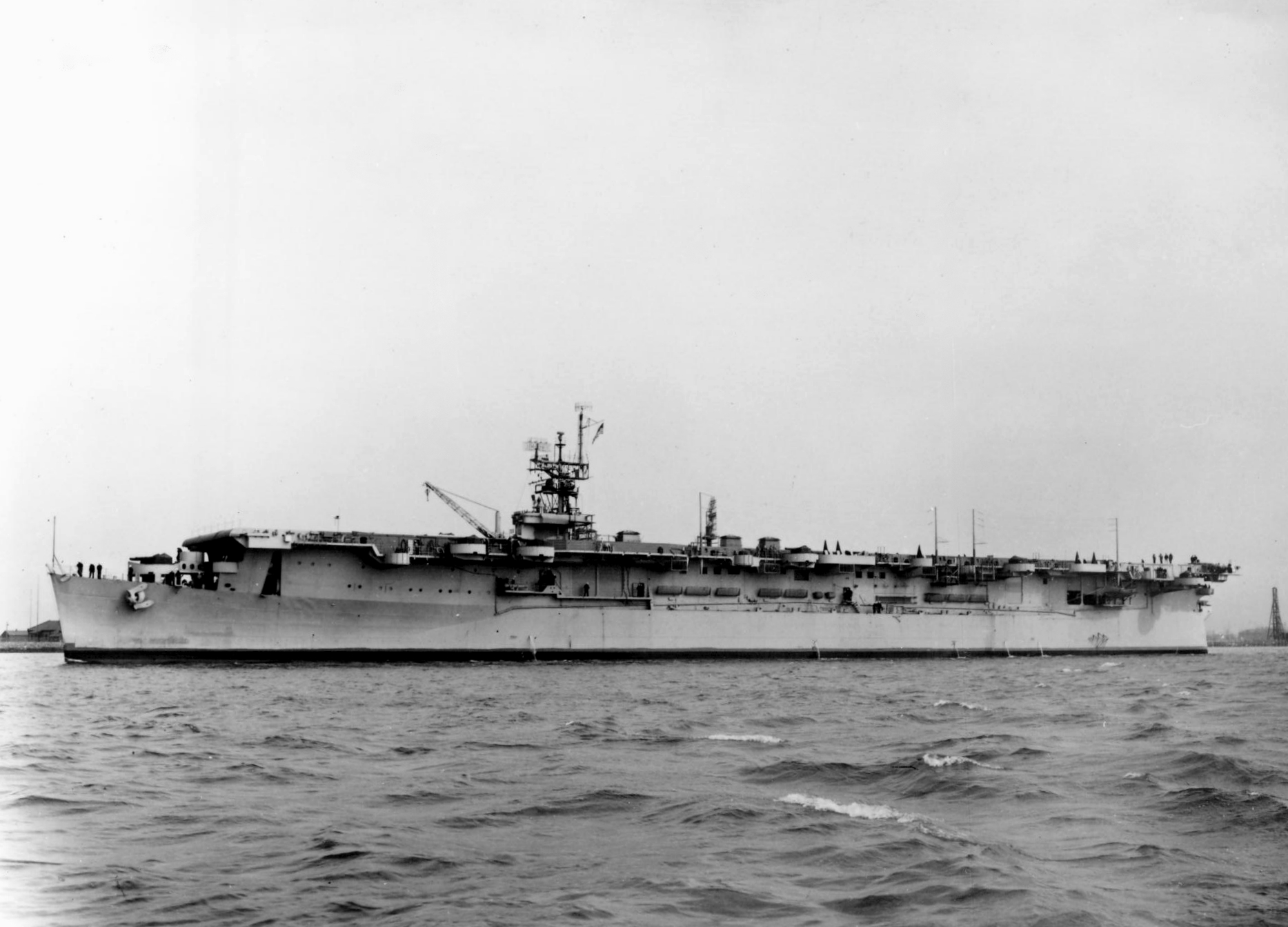
USS Belleau Wood

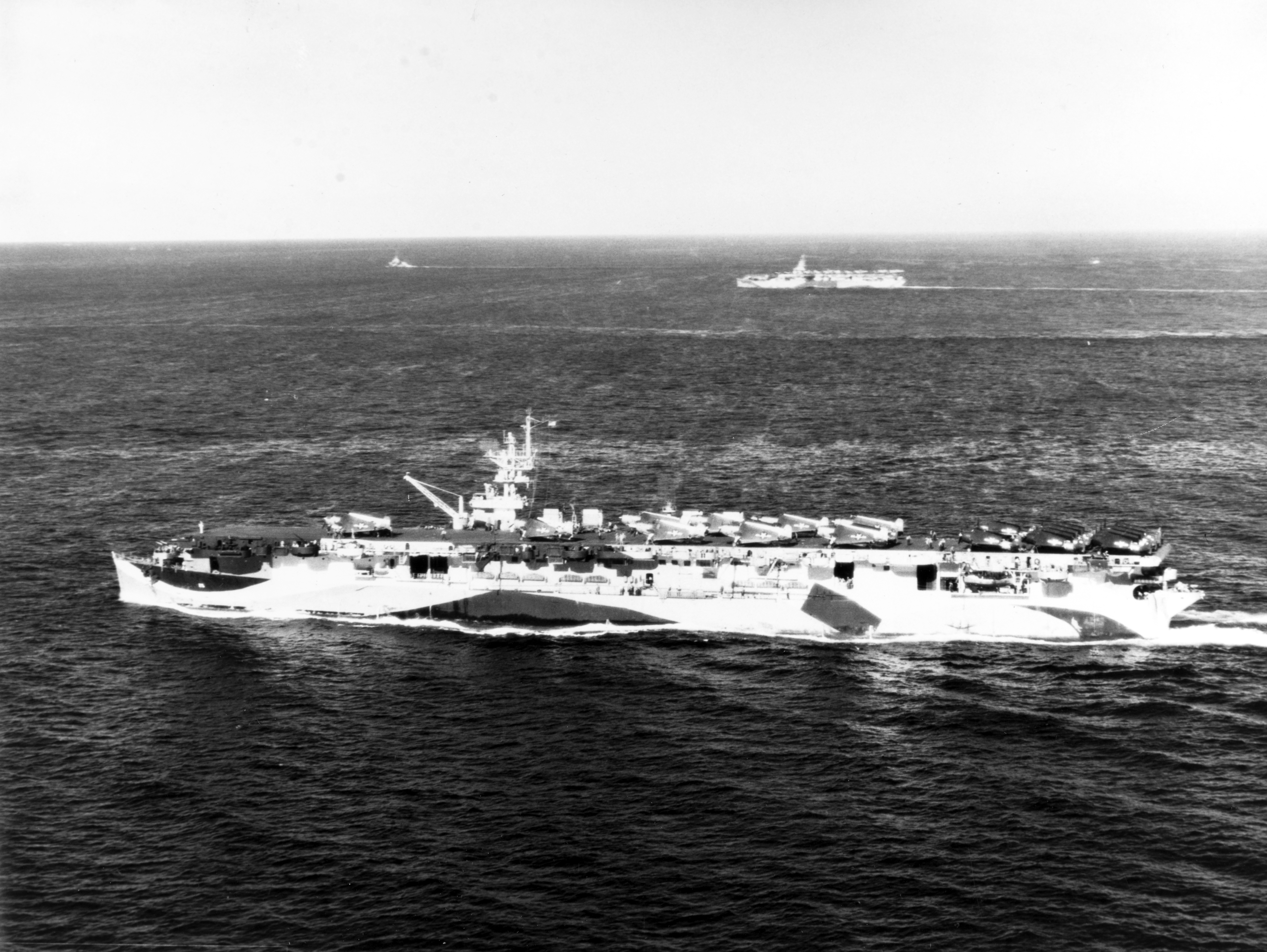
USS Cowpens

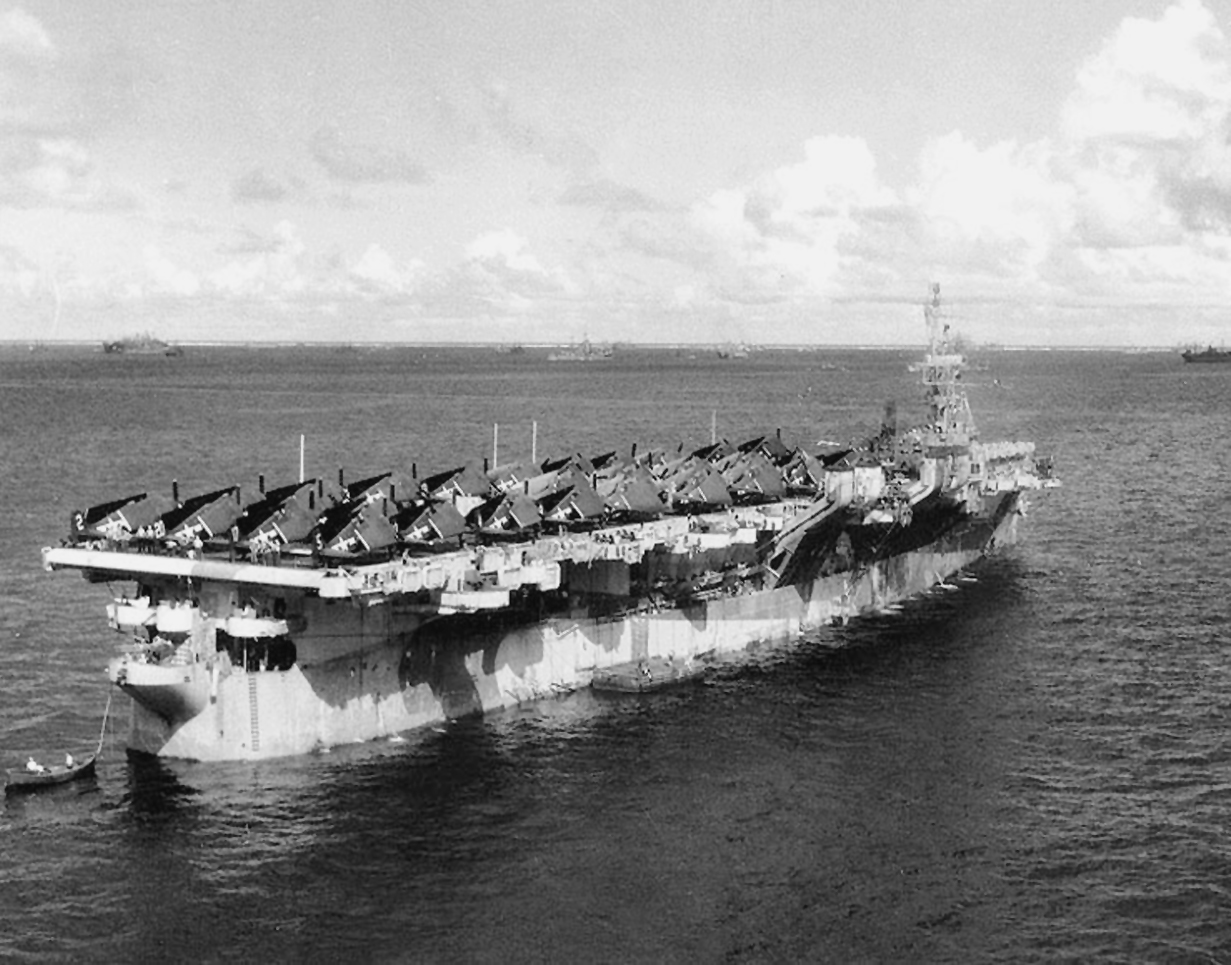
USS Monterey

Adapted from the design for the Cleveland-class light cruisers, this class of ship resulted from the interest of President Franklin D. Roosevelt in naval air power. With war looming, Roosevelt, a former Assistant Secretary of the Navy, noted that no new fleet aircraft carriers were expected to be completed before 1944. He proposed to convert some of the many cruisers then under construction to carriers. Studies of cruiser-size aircraft carriers had shown that such ships would have serious limitations, and on 13 October 1941, the General Board of the United States Navy replied that such a conversion would incorporate too many compromises to be effective.

Undeterred, President Roosevelt ordered another study. On 25 October 1941, the Navy's Bureau of Ships reported that aircraft carriers converted from cruiser hulls would be of limited capability, but available much sooner. After the December 1941 attack on Pearl Harbor, the need for more carriers became urgent. The Navy accelerated construction of the 34,000-ton Essex-class aircraft carriers, but these large ships could not be finished quickly. The Cleveland-class light cruisers then under construction were adopted to fill the gap.

Plans developed for this conversion showed much more promise than expected. Nine light cruisers were reordered as carriers in the first half of 1942. The Independence-class design had a relatively short and narrow flight deck and hangar, with a small island superstructure. The hangar, flight deck, and island represented a significant increase in the ship's topside weight. To compensate for this, blisters were added to the original cruiser hull, which increased the original beam by 5 feet (1.5 m). Ships of this class carried a small air group – only about 30 aircraft. This was originally set to consist of nine fighters, nine scout bombers, and nine torpedo bombers, but later revised to about two dozen fighters and nine torpedo bombers.

These were limited-capability ships, whose principal virtue was near-term availability. Their limited size made for seakeeping difficulties in the many typhoons of the Pacific, and their small flight decks led to a high aircraft accident rate. However, the cruiser hull and engineering allowed them the speed necessary to operate with the main fleet carrier task groups. Their names followed the US Navy's policy of naming aircraft carriers after historic navy ships (Independence), historic battles (Cowpens), or historic individuals (Langley).

== Service ==
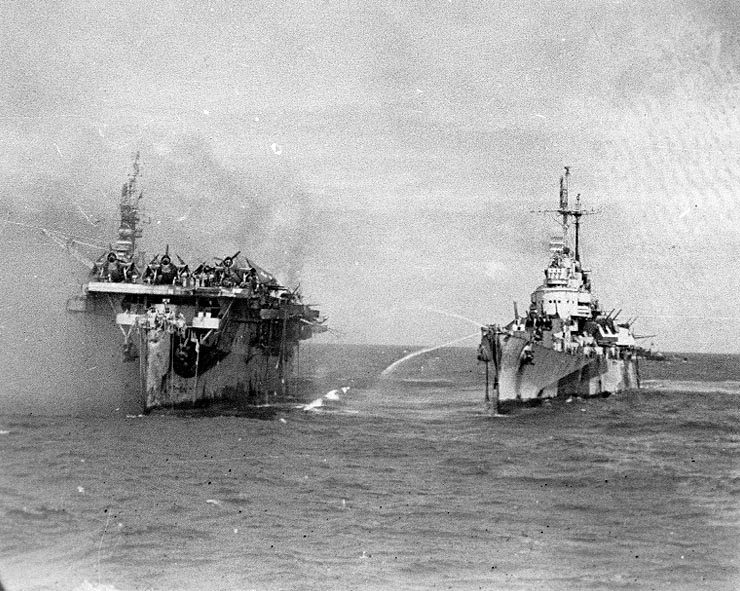
Birmingham attempts to fight fires aboard Princeton during Battle of Leyte Gulf

Completed in the course of 1943, as were the first seven of the Essex-class carriers, the nine Independence-class ships made up a vital component of the Fast Carrier Task Force, which carried the Navy's offensive through the central and western Pacific from November 1943 through August 1945. Eight of these carriers participated in the Battle of the Philippine Sea in June 1944, which effectively ended Japan's carrier air power. The light carriers provided 40 percent of the Fast Carrier Task Force's fighters and 36 percent of the torpedo bombers. The protection on these carriers was modest, and munitions often had to be stowed at the hangar level, a factor that contributed greatly to the loss of Princeton in October 1944.

== Ships in class ==
The nine ships of the Independence class were all converted from Cleveland-class light cruisers building at the New York Shipbuilding Corporation shipyard, Camden, New Jersey. Initially classified as "aircraft carriers" (CV), all were re-designated "small aircraft carriers" (CVL) on 15 July 1943 while four ships were still under construction. Two-thirds of the ships in the class took their names from decisive battles, including the Texas Revolution's Battle of San Jacinto, the Mexican-American War's Battle of Monterey and the American Revolutionary War's Battle of Princeton.

List of Independence-class aircraft carriers
Ship Name	Hull No.	Builder	Laid Down	Launched	Commissioned	Decommissioned	Fate
Independence (ex-Amsterdam)	CVL-22	New York Shipbuilding Corporation	1 May 1941	22 August 1942	14 January 1943	28 August 1946	Used as target in Operation Crossroads, 1946; Scuttled off San Francisco, 1951
Princeton (ex-Tallahassee)	CVL-23	New York Shipbuilding Corporation	2 June 1941	18 October 1942	25 February 1943	—N/a	Scuttled following air attack, 24 October 1944
Belleau Wood (ex-New Haven)	CVL-24	New York Shipbuilding Corporation	11 August 1941	6 December 1942	31 March 1943	13 January 1947	Transferred to France as Bois Belleau, 1953
Cowpens (ex-Huntington)	CVL-25	New York Shipbuilding Corporation	17 November 1941	17 January 1943	28 May 1943	13 January 1947	Broken up at Portland, 1960
Monterey (ex-Dayton)	CVL-26	New York Shipbuilding Corporation	29 December 1941	28 February 1943	17 June 1943	11 February 1947	Broken up at Philadelphia, 1971
Monterey (ex-Dayton)	CVL-26	New York Shipbuilding Corporation	29 December 1941	28 February 1943	15 September 1950	16 January 1956	Broken up at Philadelphia, 1971
Langley (ex-Fargo, ex-Crown Point)	CVL-27	New York Shipbuilding Corporation	11 April 1942	22 May 1943	31 August 1943	11 February 1947	Transferred to France as La Fayette, 1951
Cabot (ex-Wilmington)	CVL-28	New York Shipbuilding Corporation	16 March 1942	4 April 1943	24 July 1943	11 February 1947	Transferred to Spain as Dédalo, 1967
Cabot (ex-Wilmington)	CVL-28	New York Shipbuilding Corporation	16 March 1942	4 April 1943	27 October 1948	21 January 1955	Transferred to Spain as Dédalo, 1967
Bataan (ex-Buffalo)	CVL-29	New York Shipbuilding Corporation	31 August 1942	1 August 1943	17 November 1943	11 February 1947	Broken up at San Francisco, 1961
Bataan (ex-Buffalo)	CVL-29	New York Shipbuilding Corporation	31 August 1942	1 August 1943	13 May 1950	9 April 1954	Broken up at San Francisco, 1961
San Jacinto (ex-Newark, ex-Reprisal)	CVL-30	New York Shipbuilding Corporation	26 October 1942	26 September 1943	15 November 1943	1 March 1947	Broken up at Los Angeles, 1971

- Independence (CV/CVL-22) – Postwar, she was surplus to the Navy's requirements and expended in the nuclear test Operation Crossroads in July 1946. The ship survived both tests with little damage. She was used as a radiation research hulk for several years afterward and expended as a target in January 1951.
- Princeton (CV/CVL-23) – Destroyed as a result of Japanese air attack 24 October 1944 during Battle of Leyte Gulf.
- Belleau Wood (CV/CVL-24) – Decommissioned to reserve in January, 1947. Transferred to French Navy as Bois Belleau in June 1951. Returned to the US Navy for scrapping September 1960.
- Cowpens (CV/CVL-25) – Decommissioned to reserve in January, 1947. Stricken and scrapped starting November 1959.
- Monterey (CV/CVL-26) – Decommissioned to reserve February 1947. Recommissioned as training carrier September 1950, decommissioned to reserve again January 1956. Re-designated aircraft transport AVT-2 May 1959. Stricken June 1970.
- Langley CVL-27 – Decommissioned to reserve February 1947. Transferred to France as La Fayette on 2 June 1951. Returned to USN and stricken March 1963, scrapped at Baltimore in 1964.

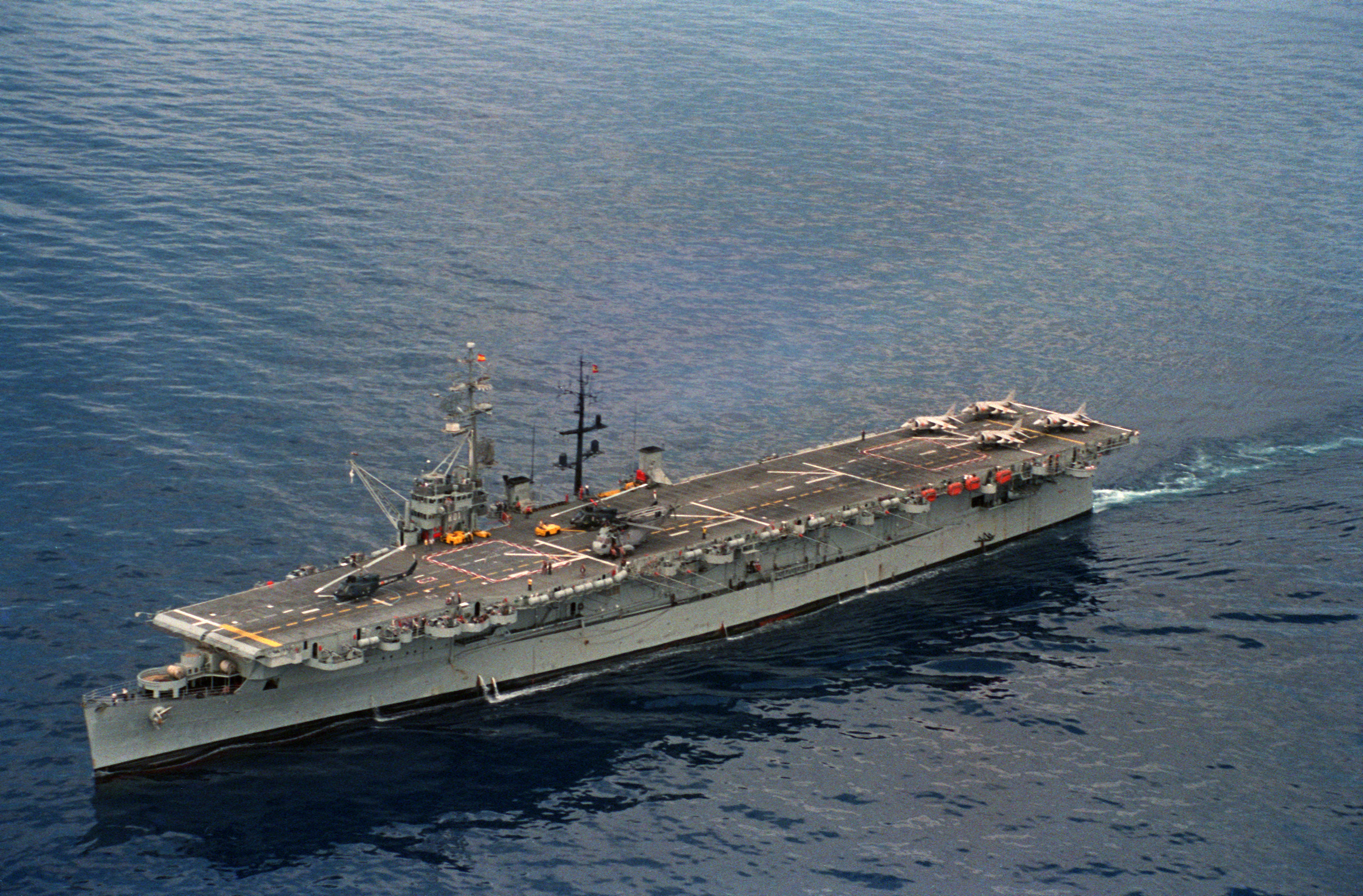
Spanish Navy aircraft carrier Dédalo R-01 (ex USS Cabot CVL-28) in 1988.

- Cabot CVL-28 – Decommissioned to reserve February 1947, recommissioned and modernised as anti-submarine warfare (ASW) carrier October 1948. Decommissioned to reserve January 1955, modernised 1965–1967 and transferred to Spain as Dédalo on 30 August 1967. Stricken from Naval Vessel Register and sold to Spain August 1972. Decommissioned for preservation at New Orleans August 1989, preservation efforts failed. Scrapped at Brownsville, Texas starting October 2000.
- Bataan CVL-29 – Decommissioned to reserve February 1947, recommissioned and modernised as ASW carrier May 1950. Only ship in the Independence class to serve in combat during the Korean War. Decommissioned to reserve April 1954. Stricken for scrapping September 1959.
- San Jacinto CVL-30 – Decommissioned to reserve March 1947. Stricken June 1970.

== Disposal ==
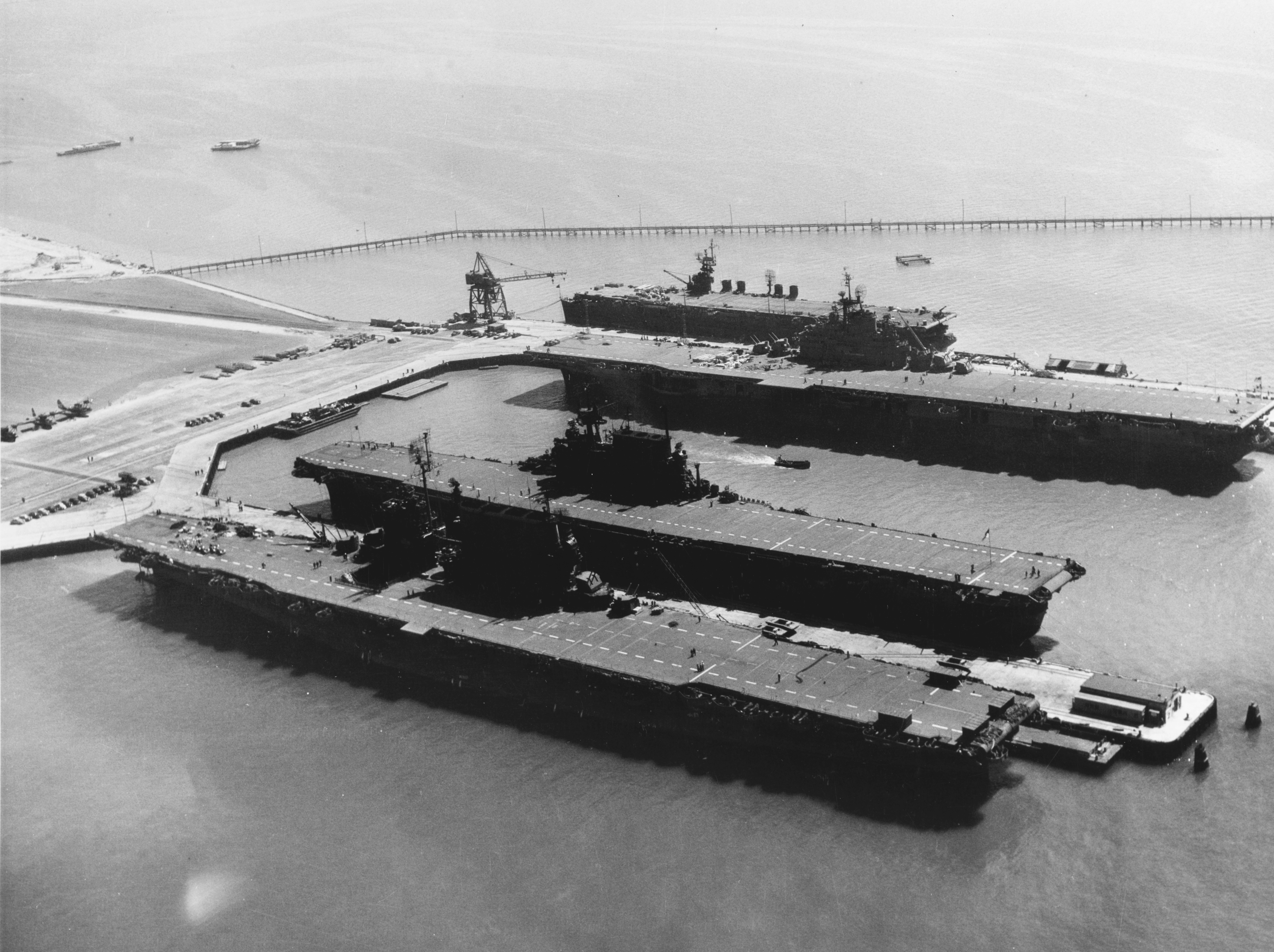
Side by side comparisons: two fleet carriers from the outbreak of the war, USS Saratoga and USS Enterprise, moored near the Essex-class USS Hornet. Beyond the Hornet is moored the Independence-class USS San Jacinto.

There was little margin for growth, as the ships' post-war careers showed. Independence was expended as an atomic bomb target, and the rest were laid up in 1947. Five returned to service in 1948–53, two with the French Navy. Two were used as training carriers, while Bataan saw Korean War combat duty with Marine Corps air groups. She and Cabot received anti-submarine warfare modernizations in the early 1950s, emerging with two funnels instead of the original four. All but the French ships were decommissioned in 1954–56 and were reclassified as aircraft transports in 1959. Cabot got a new lease on life in 1967, when she became the Spanish Navy's carrier Dédalo, serving until 1989 (in Spanish service, she was the first carrier to regularly deploy the Harrier jump jet). Despite efforts to preserve her, Cabot was scrapped at Brownsville in 1999–2003. Preservation efforts continued until the hull was half scrapped.

== See also ==
- Ibuki-class cruiser – Japanese cruiser converted into a light aircraft carrier (not completed)
- Escort carrier – Light aircraft carriers intended primarily for convoy escort duties.

Media related to Independence class aircraft carrier at Wikimedia Commons

== Bibliography ==
- Faltum, Andrew The Independence Class Aircraft Carriers, Nautical & Aviation Publishing, ISBN 1-877853-62-3
- Wright, C. C. (1998). "Design Histories of United States Navy Warships of World War II: An Example of an Official History–USS Independence (CVL-22)". Warship International. XXXV (4): 342–370. ISSN 0043-0374.
