= USS Cabot (CVL-28) =

Independence-class light aircraft carrier of the US Navy

- USS Cabot (July 1945)

History

United States
- Name: Cabot
- Namesake: John Cabot
- Ordered: ??? (as CL-79 ); 2 June 1942 (as CV-28)
- Builder: New York Shipbuilding Corporation
- Laid down: 16 March 1942
- Launched: 4 April 1943
- Sponsored by: Mrs. A. C. Read
- Commissioned: 24 July 1943
- Decommissioned: 11 February 1947
- Recommissioned: 27 October 1948
- Decommissioned: 21 January 1955
- Reclassified: CV-28, 2 June 1942; CVL-28, 15 July 1943; AVT-3, 15 May 1959
- Stricken: 1 August 1972
- Identification: Hull number: CVL-28
- Fate: Loaned to Spanish Navy 30 August 1967; Served as Dédalo 1967–1989; Sold to Spain 1972; Stricken by Spanish Navy 1989; Scrapped 2002

Spain
- Name: Dédalo
- Acquired: 30 August 1967 (loan); 2 December 1972 (purchased)
- Reclassified: PH-01, 30 August 1967; PA-01, 28 September 1976; R-01, 1980
- Refit: 1976
- Stricken: 5 August 1989
- Fate: Scrapped, 2002

General characteristics
- Class & type: Independence-class aircraft carrier
- Displacement: 11,000 tons (standard)
- Length: 622.5 ft (189.7 m)
- Beam: 71.5 ft (21.8 m) (waterline); 109 ft 2 in (33.27 m) (overall)
- Draft: 26 ft (7.9 m)
- Speed: 32 knots (59 km/h; 37 mph)
- Complement: 1,569 officers and men
- Armament: 26 × Bofors 40 mm guns
- Aircraft carried: 35 aircraft
- USS Cabot
- Formerly listed on the U.S. National Register of Historic Places
- Former U.S. National Historic Landmark
- Location: New Orleans, Louisiana (1990–1997); Brownsville, Texas (1997–2001)
- NRHP reference No.: 90000334

Significant dates
- Added to NRHP: 21 June 1990
- Designated NHL: 21 June 1990
- Removed from NRHP: 7 August 2001
- Delisted NHL: 7 August 2001

USS Cabot (CVL-28/AVT-3) was an Independence-class light aircraft carrier in the United States Navy, the second ship to carry the name, after the explorer John Cabot. Cabot was commissioned in 1943 and served until 1947. She was recommissioned as a training carrier from 1948 to 1955. From 1967 to 1989, she served in Spain as Dédalo. After attempts to preserve her failed, she was scrapped in 2002.

== Construction ==
Cabot was laid down as Wilmington (CL-79), a Cleveland-class light cruiser, redesignated CV-28 on 2 June 1942, renamed Cabot on 23 June 1942 and converted while building. She was launched on 4 April 1943 by New York Shipbuilding Company, Camden, New Jersey; sponsored by Mrs. A. C. Read. She was reclassified CVL-28 on 15 July 1943 and commissioned on 24 July 1943.

== Service history ==
=== United States ===
==== World War II (1943–1945) ====
Cabot sailed from Naval Air Station Quonset Point, Rhode Island with Air Group 31 aboard, on 8 November 1943 for Pearl Harbor, where she arrived on 2 December. Clearing for Majuro on 15 January 1944, she joined TF 58 to begin the consistently high quality of war service which was to earn her a Presidential Unit Citation. From 4 February to 4 March 1944, she launched her planes in strikes on Roi, Namur, and the island stronghold of Truk, aiding in the neutralization of these Japanese bases as her part in the invasion of the Marshalls.

Cabot returned to Pearl Harbor for a brief repair period, but was back in action from Majuro for the pounding raids on the Palaus, Yap, Ulithi, and Woleai at the close of March 1944. She sailed to provide valuable air cover for the Hollandia (currently known as Jayapura) operation from 22 to 25 April, and 4 days later began to hurl her air power at Truk, Satawan, and Ponape. She cleared Majuro again on 6 June for the preinvasion air strikes in the Mariana Islands, and on 19 and 20 June launched sorties in the key Battle of the Philippine Sea, the famous "Marianas Turkey Shoot", which hopelessly crippled Japanese naval aviation. Cabot's Air Group 31 pounded Japanese bases on Iwo Jima, Pagan, Rota, Guam, Yap and Ulithi as the carrier continued her support of the Marianas operation until 9 August.

Preinvasion strikes in the Palaus in September 1944 along with air attacks on Mindanao, the Visayas, and Luzon paved the way for the long-awaited return to the Philippines. On 6 October, Air Group 29 relieved Air Group 31, and Cabot sailed from Ulithi for raids on Okinawa to provide air cover for her task group during the heavy enemy attacks off Formosa on 12 and 13 October. Cabot joined the group which screened "Cripple Division 1", Canberra and Houston which had been torpedoed off Formosa, to the safety of the Carolines, then rejoined her group for continued air strikes on the Visayas, and the Battle of Leyte Gulf on 25 and 26 October.

Cabot remained on patrol off Luzon, conducting strikes in support of operations ashore, and repelling desperate kamikaze attacks. On 25 November, a particularly vicious one occurred. Cabot had fought off several kamikazes when one, already flaming from hits, crashed the flight deck on the port side, destroying the still-firing 20 mm gun platform, disabling the 40 mm Mounts and a gun director: Another of Cabot's victims crashed close aboard and showered the port side with shrapnel and burning debris. 62 men were killed or wounded but careful training had produced a crew which handled damage control smoothly and coolly. While she continued to maintain her station in formation and operate effectively, temporary repairs were made. On 28 November, she arrived at Ulithi for permanent repairs.

Cabot returned to action on 11 December 1944, steaming with the force striking Luzon, Formosa, Indo-China, Hong Kong, and the Nansei Shoto in support of the Luzon operations during the South China Sea raid. From 10 February to 1 March 1945, her planes pounded the Japanese homeland and the Bonins to suppress opposition to the invasion of Iwo Jima. Continued strikes against Kyūshū and Okinawa in March prepared for the invasion of the latter island. After these prolonged, intensive operations, Cabot was homeward bound for San Francisco for a much-needed overhaul completed in June.

After refresher training at Pearl Harbor with Air Group 32 aboard, the carrier launched strikes on Wake Island on 1 August while en route to Eniwetok. Here she remained on training duty until the end of the war. Sailing on 21 August, she joined TG 38.3 to support the landings of occupation troops in the Yellow Sea area in September and October. Embarking homeward-bound men at Guam, Cabot arrived at San Diego on 9 November, then sailed for the east coast. Cabot was placed out of commission in reserve at Philadelphia on 11 February 1947.

==== Post-War (1948–1955) ====
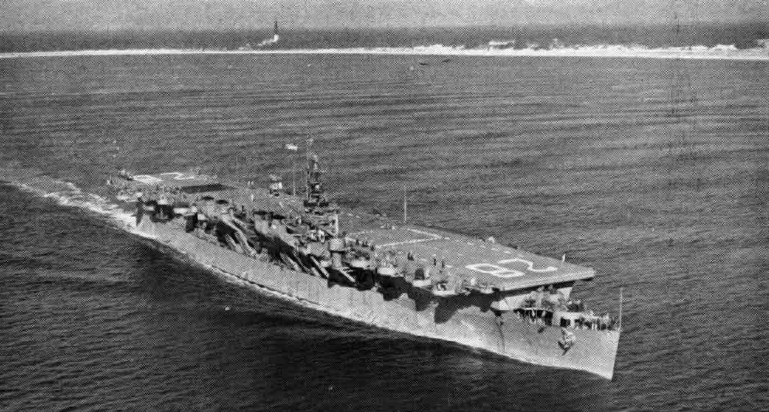
Cabot as a training carrier in 1949.

Recommissioned 27 October 1948, Cabot was assigned to the Naval Air Reserve training program. She operated out of Pensacola as a training carrier qualifying carrier-based pilots before being relieved in that role by Monterey in 1951. Later, she was reassigned to Quonset Point, on cruises to the Caribbean, and had one tour of duty in European waters from 9 January to 26 March 1952. Cabot was again placed out of commission in the reserve fleet at the Philadelphia Naval Yard on 21 January 1955. She was reclassified AVT-3 on 15 May 1959.

=== Spanish Navy ===
==== 1967–1989 ====
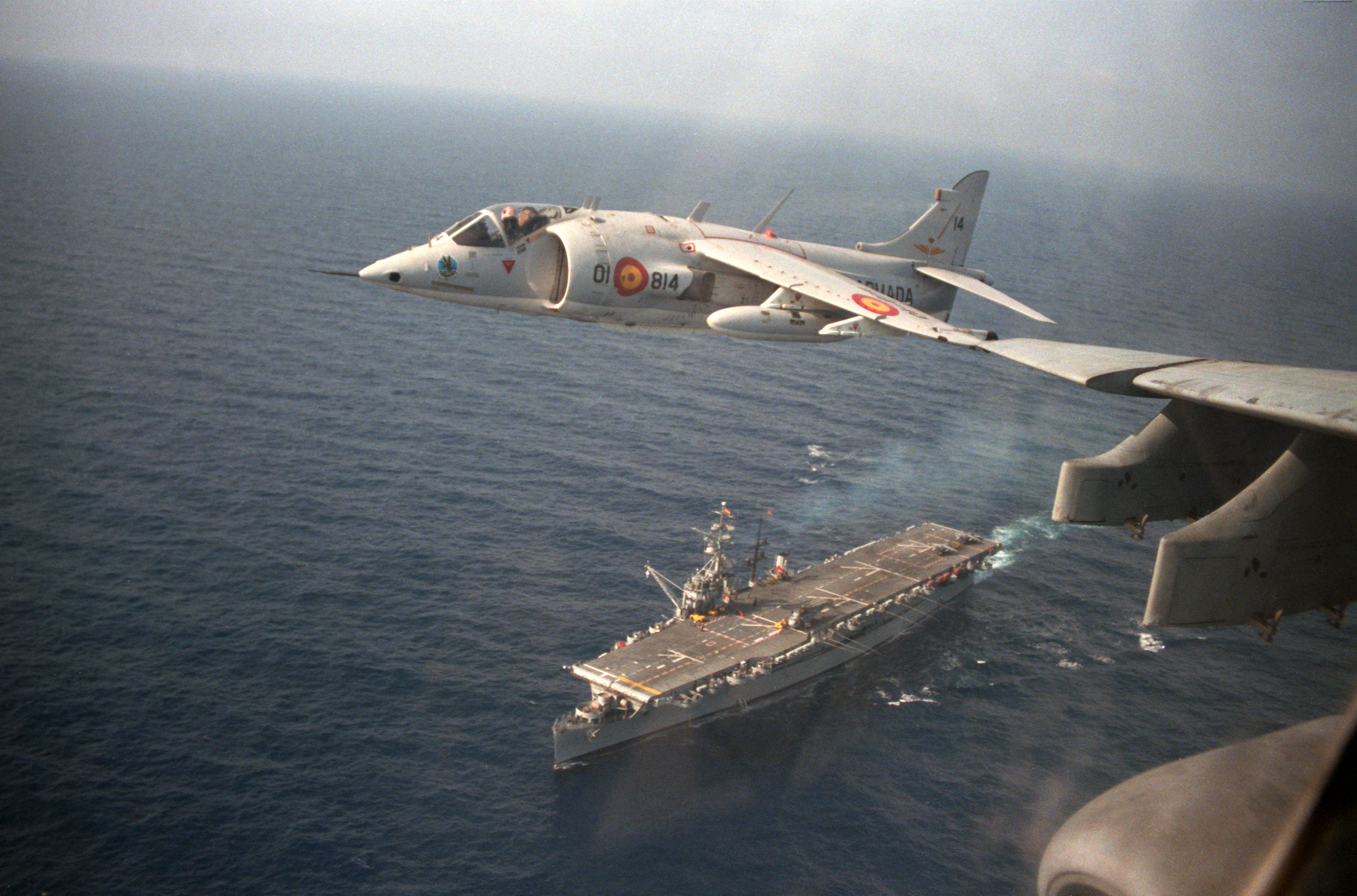
Spanish Navy AV-8S Matador flies over the aircraft carrier Dédalo in 1988

In 1967, after over twelve years in "mothballs", Cabot was loaned to Spain, in whose navy she served with the name of Dédalo and was equipped with the AV-8S Matador. The loan was converted to a sale and USS Cabot was stricken from the Naval Vessel Register on 1 August 1972. Dédalo was stricken from the Spanish Navy in August 1989 and given to a private organization in the U.S. for conversion to a museum ship.

=== Preservation attempts (1990–2002) ===
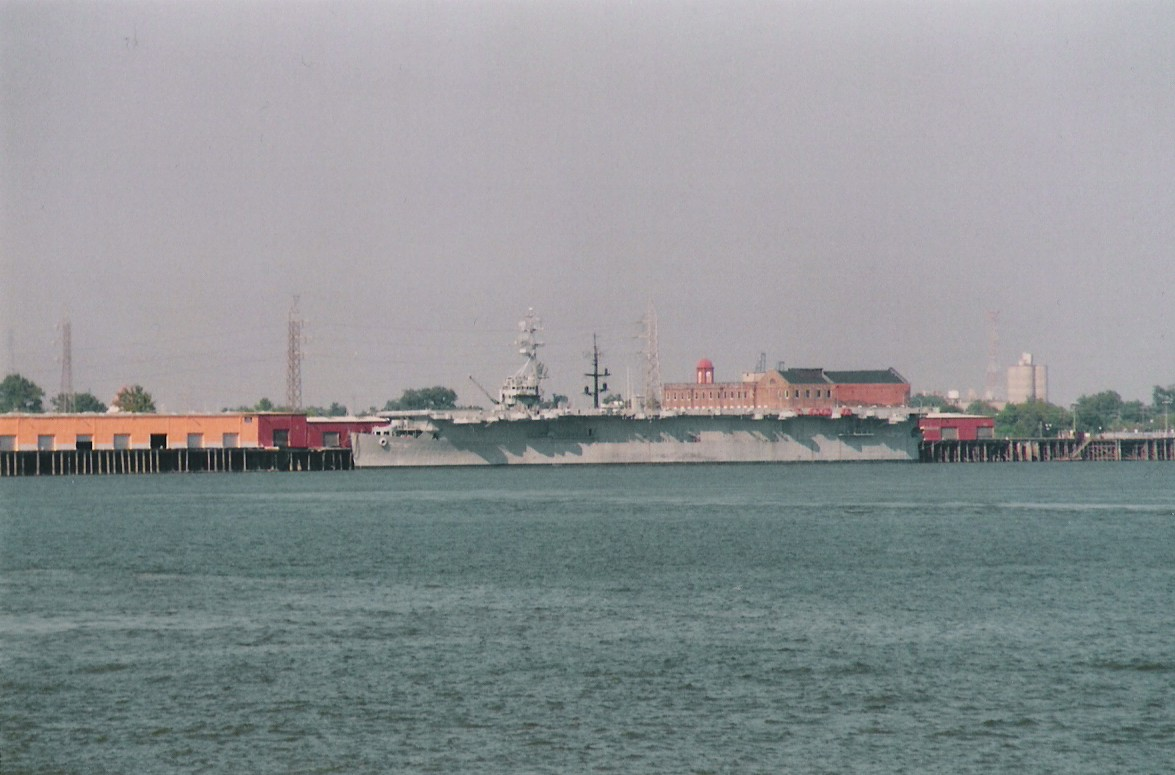
Cabot in New Orleans in 1995.

Cabot was designated as a National Historic Landmark on 29 June 1990. The ship spent most of the 1990s berthed in New Orleans. The private groups attempting to preserve her as a memorial were unable to pay creditors, and on 10 September 1999 the ship was auctioned off by the U.S. Marshals Service to Sabe Marine Salvage of Brownsville, Texas. Its designation as a National Historic Landmark was withdrawn on 7 August 2001. Scrapping of the hulk was completed in 2002.

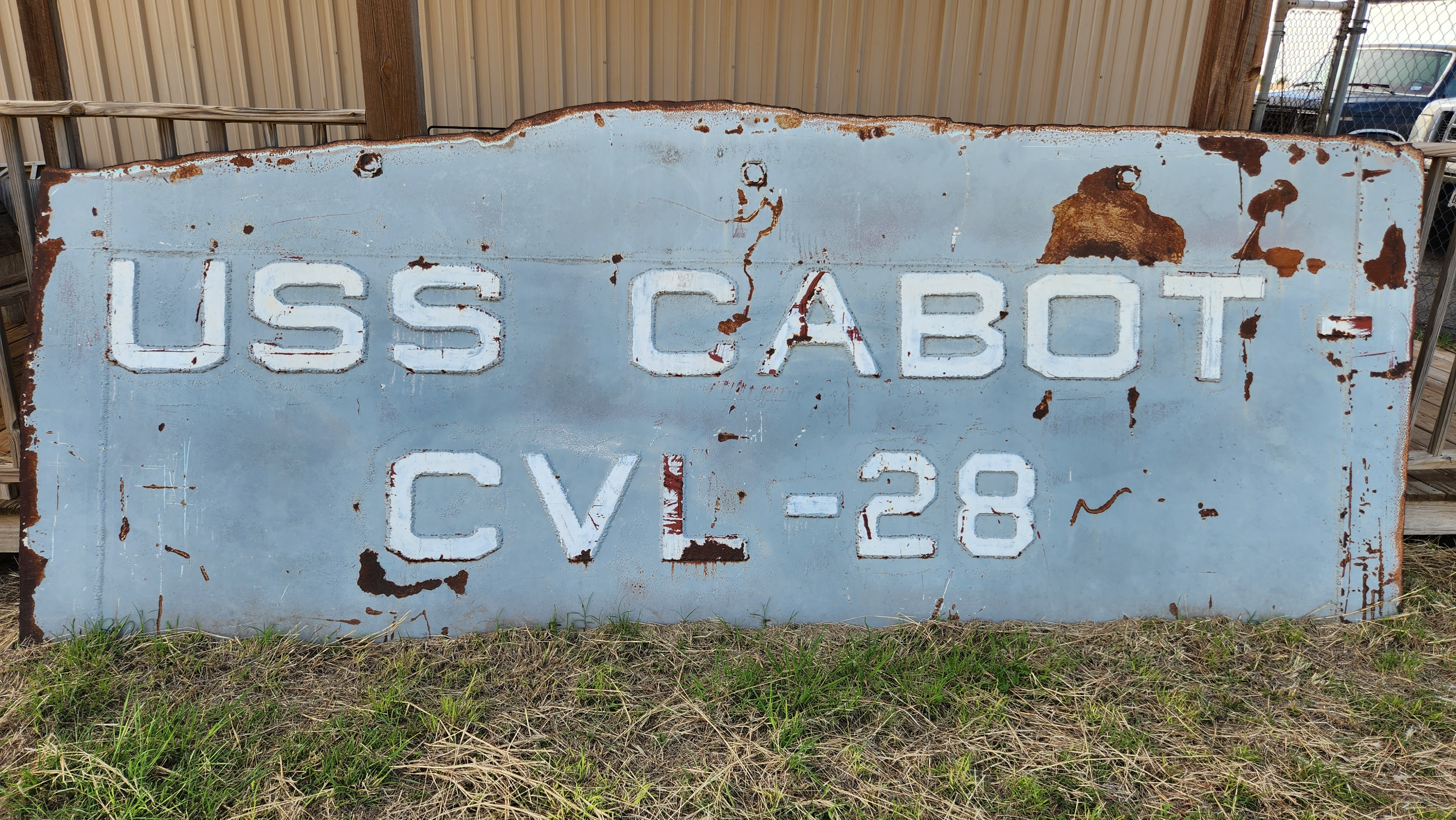
Stern plate of the USS Cabot (CVL-28).

Her island and stern plate, along with the island of USS Iwo Jima, were obtained for preservation by the Texas Air Museum, at Rio Hondo, Texas. However, that museum subsequently closed, and Cabot's island was demolished. Cabot's stern plate is on display at the Texas Air Museum, at Slaton, Texas. The National Museum of Naval Aviation at NAS Pensacola constructed a replica of Cabot's island using original plans, along with a reconstructed section of flight deck.

The USS Lexington aircraft museum in Corpus Christi, Texas, has a large collection of items from Cabot, including all the guns and the anchor. A museum room contains information, artifacts, and pictures of Cabot.

== Awards ==
- Presidential Unit Citation
- Asiatic-Pacific Campaign Medal with nine battle stars
- World War II Victory Medal
- Navy Occupation Medal with "ASIA" and "EUROPE" clasps
- National Defense Service Medal
