= Philippine Sea order of battle =

IJ Combined Fleet and US Pacific Fleet Commanders

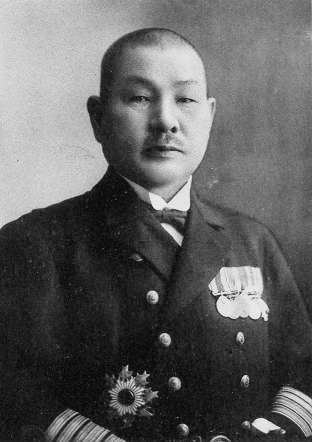
Adm. Soemu Toyoda (HQ at Tokyo)

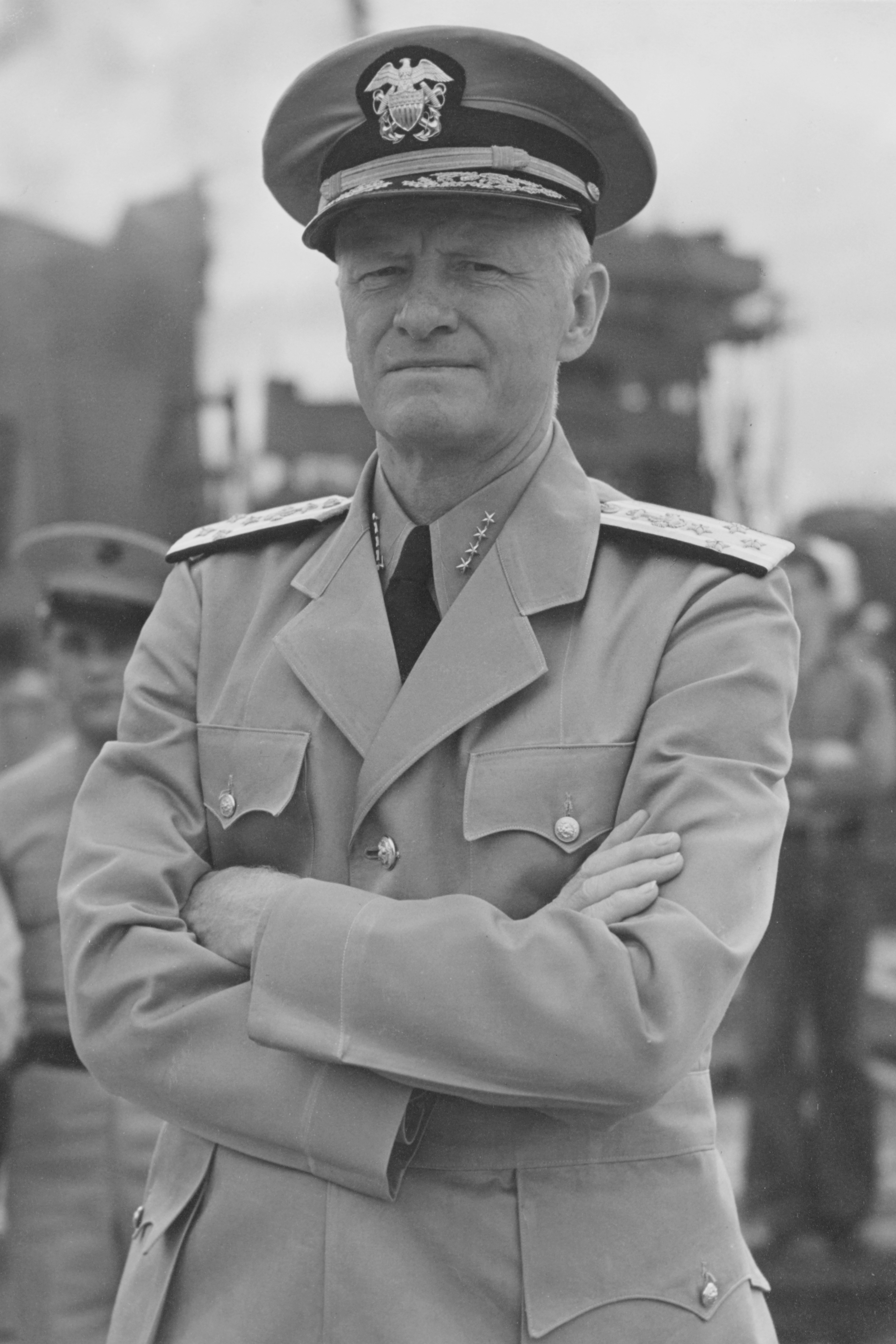
Adm. Chester W. Nimitz (HQ at Pearl Harbor)

The Battle of the Philippine Sea was fought 19–20 June 1944 in the waters west of the Mariana Islands by elements of the Imperial Japanese Navy's Combined Fleet and of the United States Navy's Pacific Fleet. The battle resulted from the Japanese reaction to the American invasion of the island of Saipan. Instead of attacking the troop transports off Saipan, Admiral Toyoda chose to engage the American carrier forces in what he intended to be the long-awaited “decisive battle” that would crush U.S. naval power.

The outcome was a disaster for the Japanese Navy. The battle exacted a terrible toll from the Japanese naval air arm, costing them most of their few remaining experienced pilots. The Combined Fleet was no longer capable of serious offensive operations after this engagement. Historian Samuel Eliot Morison characterized it this way:

This was the greatest carrier battle of the war. The forces engaged were three to four times those in preceding actions like Midway, and victory was so complete that the Japanese could never again engage on such a scale. ... above all the skill, initiative, and intrepid courage of the young aviators made this day one of the high points in the history of the American spirit.

Since the Japanese assumed the tactical offensive, their forces are listed first.

== Forces deployed ==
Losses in parentheses

Ship Type	(Empire of Japan) IJN	USN
Fleet carriers (CV)	5 (3)	7
Light carriers (CVL)	4	8
Super battleships (SBB)	2	
Fast battleships (BB)	3	7
Heavy cruisers (CA)	11	8
Light cruisers (CL)	2	13
Destroyers (DD)	33 (5)	67
Submarines (SS)	24 (13)	?? (2 IJN carriers claimed sunk by US subs; see Seventh Fleet Submarines‘ locations in order of battle listed below)

Aircraft type	(Empire of Japan) IJN	USN
Fighters	230	455
Dive bombers	119	242
Torpedo bombers	101	203
Totals	450	900
Aircraft losses	(415)	(123)

== Japanese order of battle ==
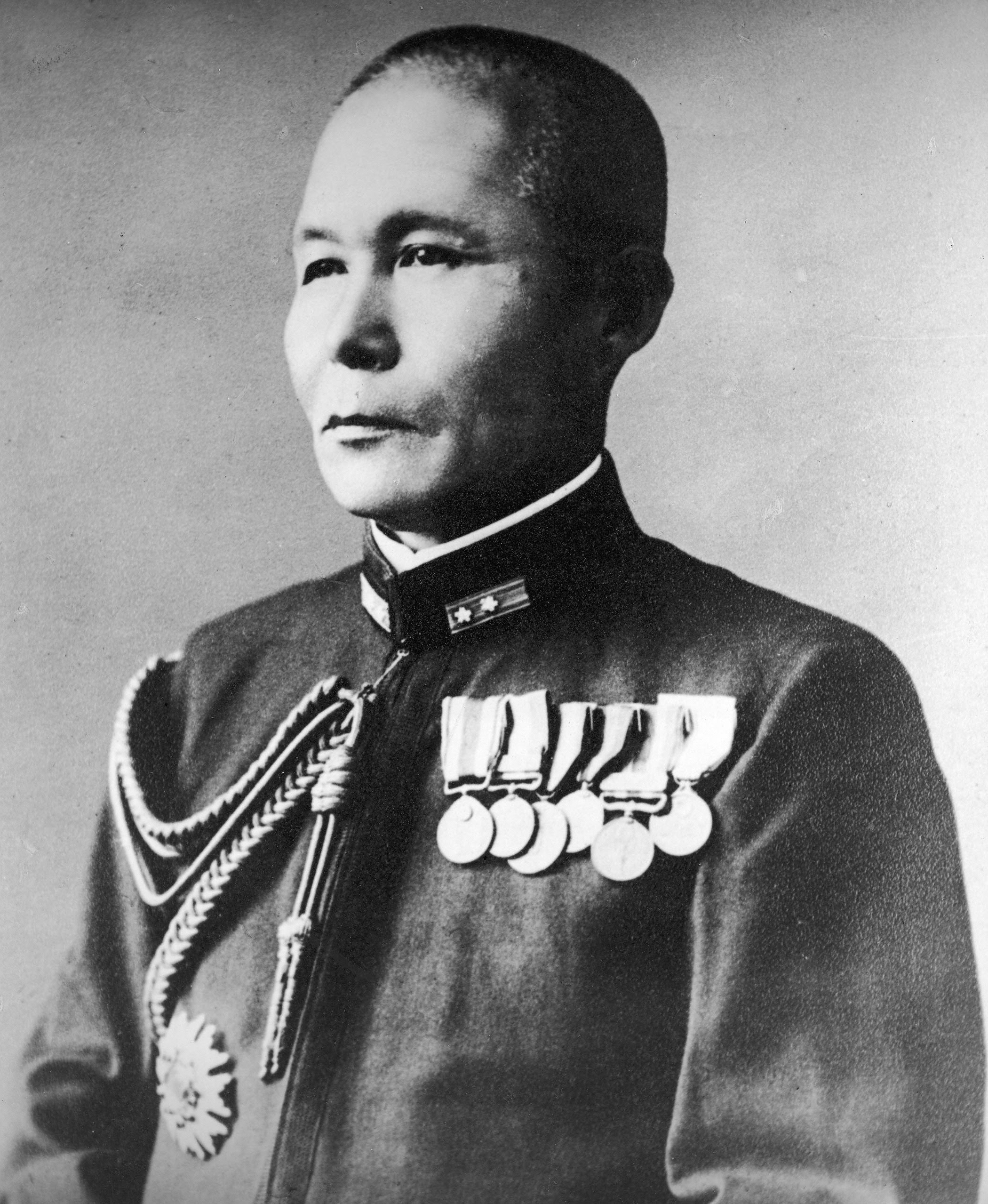
Vice Adm. Jisaburō Ozawa

Mobile Fleet
Vice Admiral Jisaburō Ozawa in Taihō

=== "A" Force ===
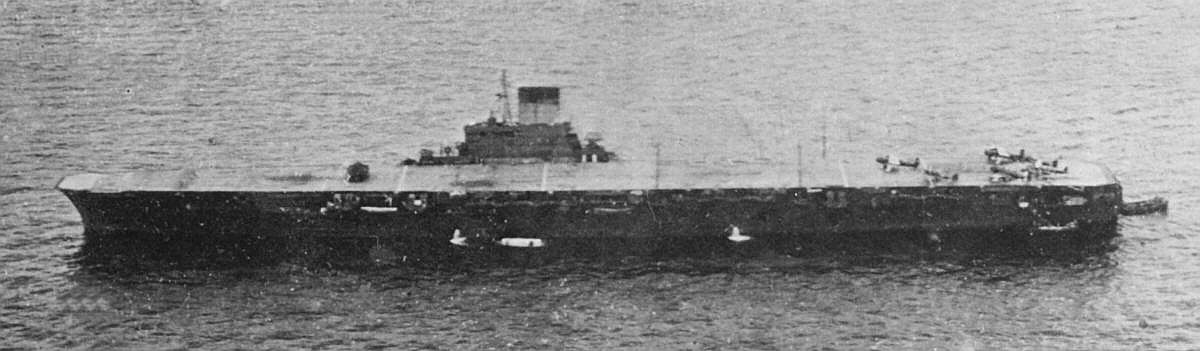
Vice Adm. Ozawa's flagship Taiho

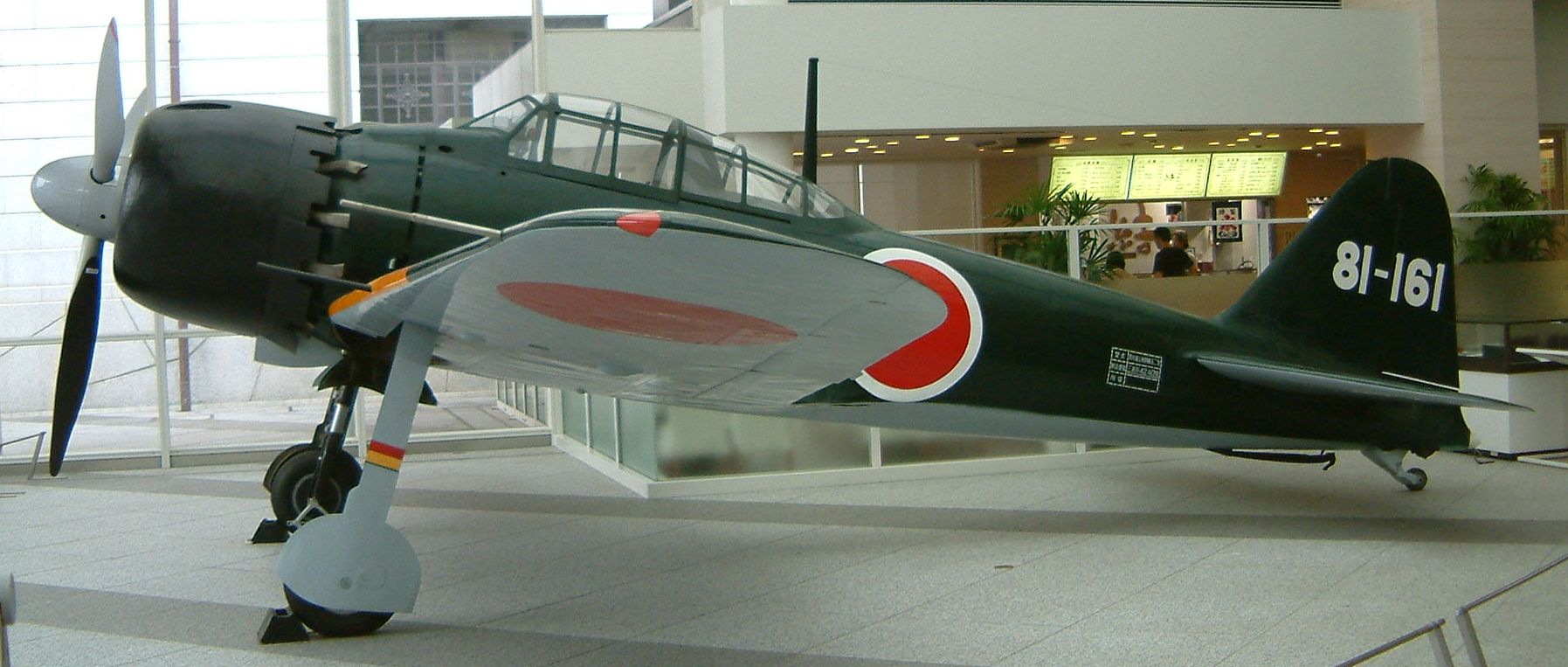
Mitsubishi A6M "Zeke" fighter

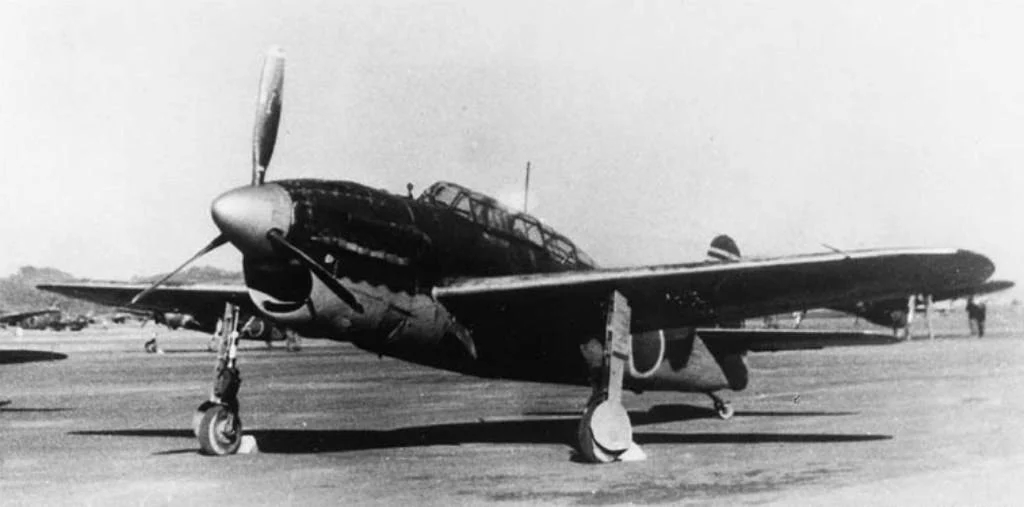
Yokosuka D4Y "Judy" dive bomber

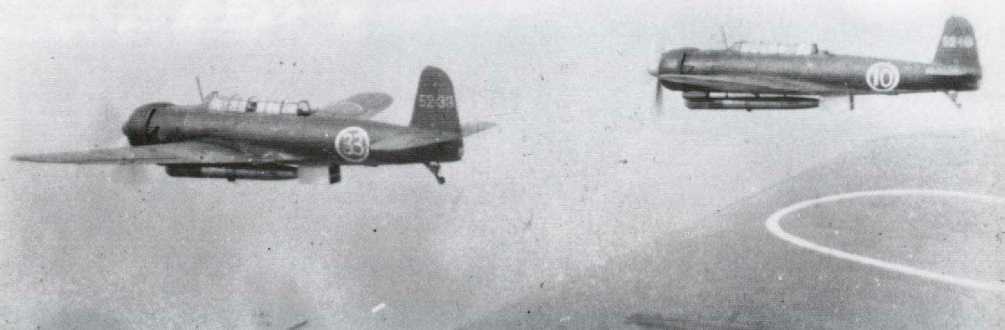
Nakajima B6N "Jill" torpedo bombers

Sortied 13 June from Tawi Tawi anchorage off NE Borneo
Vice Admiral Jisaburō Ozawa

Carrier Division 1 (Vice Adm. Ozawa)

3 fleet carriers

Taihō (sunk by submarine 19 June)
Shōkaku (sunk by submarine 19 June)
Zuikaku
Air Unit

79 Mitsubishi A6M "Zeke" fighters
70 Yokosuka D4Y "Judy" dive bombers
7 Aichi D3A "Val" dive bombers
51 Nakajima B6N "Jill" torpedo bombers

Cruiser Division 5 (Rear Adm. Shintaro Hashimoto)

2 heavy cruisers: Myōkō, Haguro

Screen (Rear Adm. Susumu Kimura in Yahagi)

1 light cruiser: Yahagi
9 destroyers

1 Asashio-class (6 × 5 in. main battery): Asagumo
3 Kagerō-class (6 × 5 in. main battery): Isokaze, Tanikaze (sunk by submarine 9 June), Urakaze
4 Akizuki-class (8 × 3.9 in. main battery): Akizuki, Hatsuzuki, Wakatsuki, Shimotsuki
1 Mutsuki-class (4 × 4.7 in. main battery): Minazuki (sunk by submarine 6 June)

=== "B" Force ===
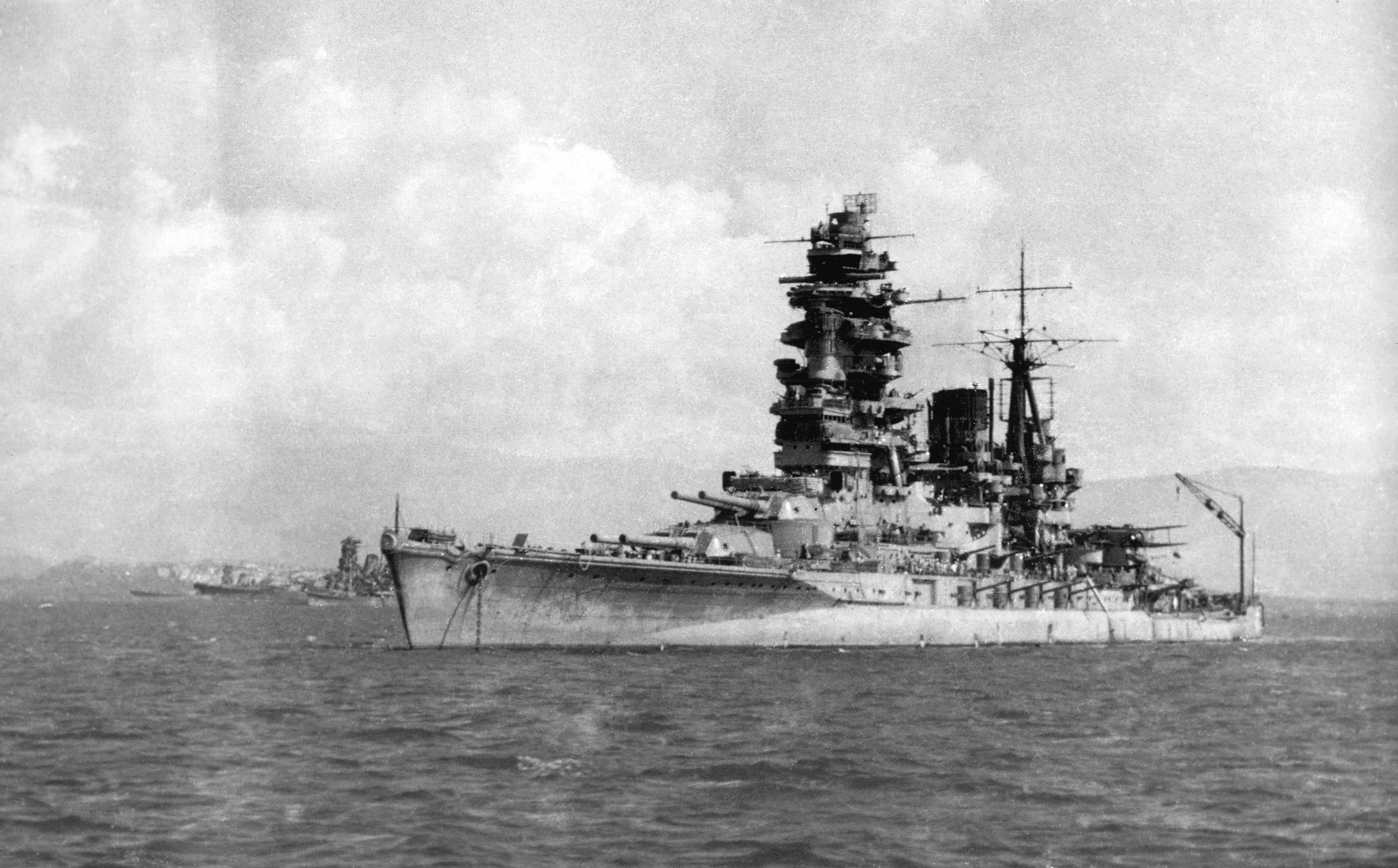
Old battleship Nagato

Sortied 13 June from Tawi Tawi anchorage off NE Borneo
Rear Admiral Takatsugu Jōjima in Jun'yo

Carrier Division 2 (Rear Admiral Jōjima)

2 converted carriers

Jun'yō
Hiyō (sunk by air attack 20 June)

1 light carrier

Ryūhō
Air Unit

81 Mitsubishi A6M "Zeke" fighters
27 Yokosuka D4Y "Judy" dive bombers
9 Aichi D3A "Val" dive bombers
18 Nakajima B6N "Jill" torpedo bombers

1 old battleship: Nagato
1 heavy cruiser: Mogami
Screen

10 destroyers

2 Asashio-class (6 × 5 in. main battery): Michishio, Yamagumo
2 Kagerō-class (6 × 5 in. main battery): Nowaki, Hamakaze
2 Yūgumo-class (6 × 5 in. main battery): Hayashimo, Akishimo
4 Shiratsuyu-class (5 × 5 in. main battery): Shiratsuyu (sunk following collision with Seiyo Maru 14 June), Shigure, Samidare, Harusame (sunk by air attack 8 June)

=== Van Force ===
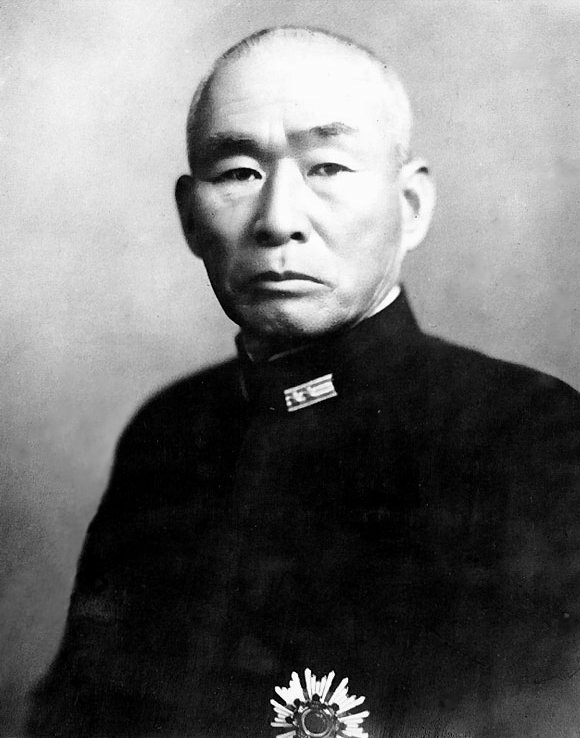
Vice Adm. Takeo Kurita

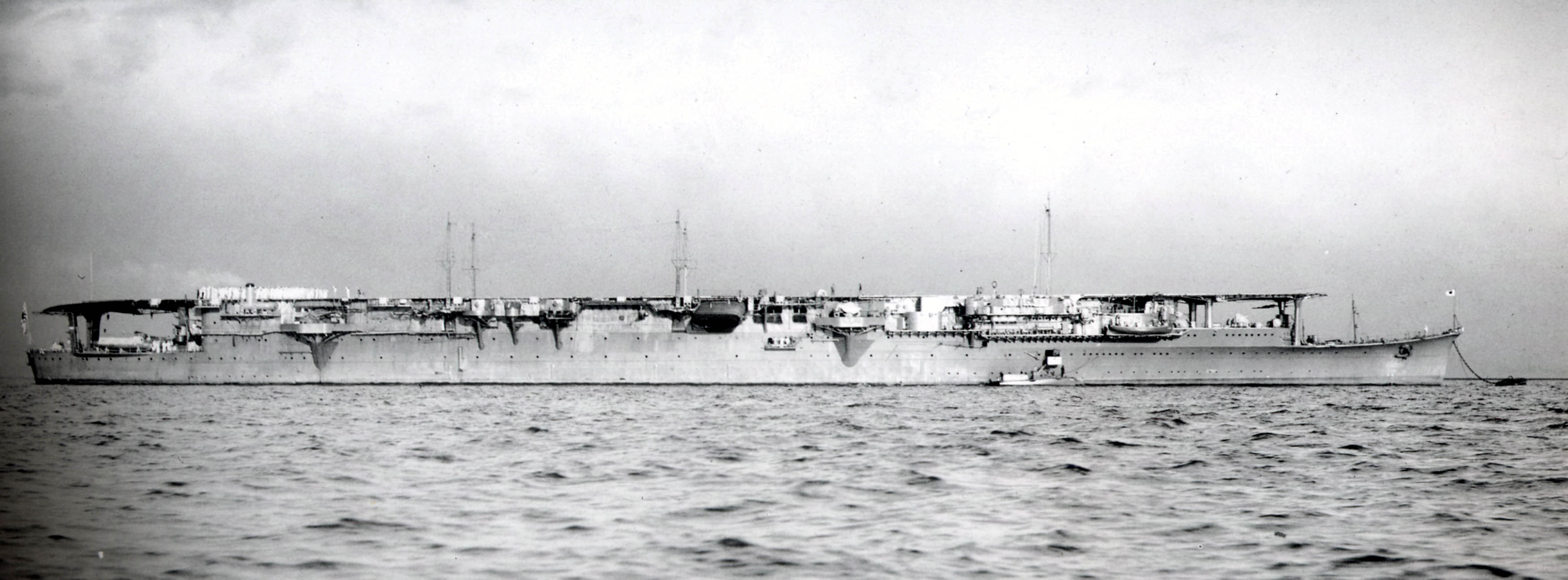
Light carrier Zuihō

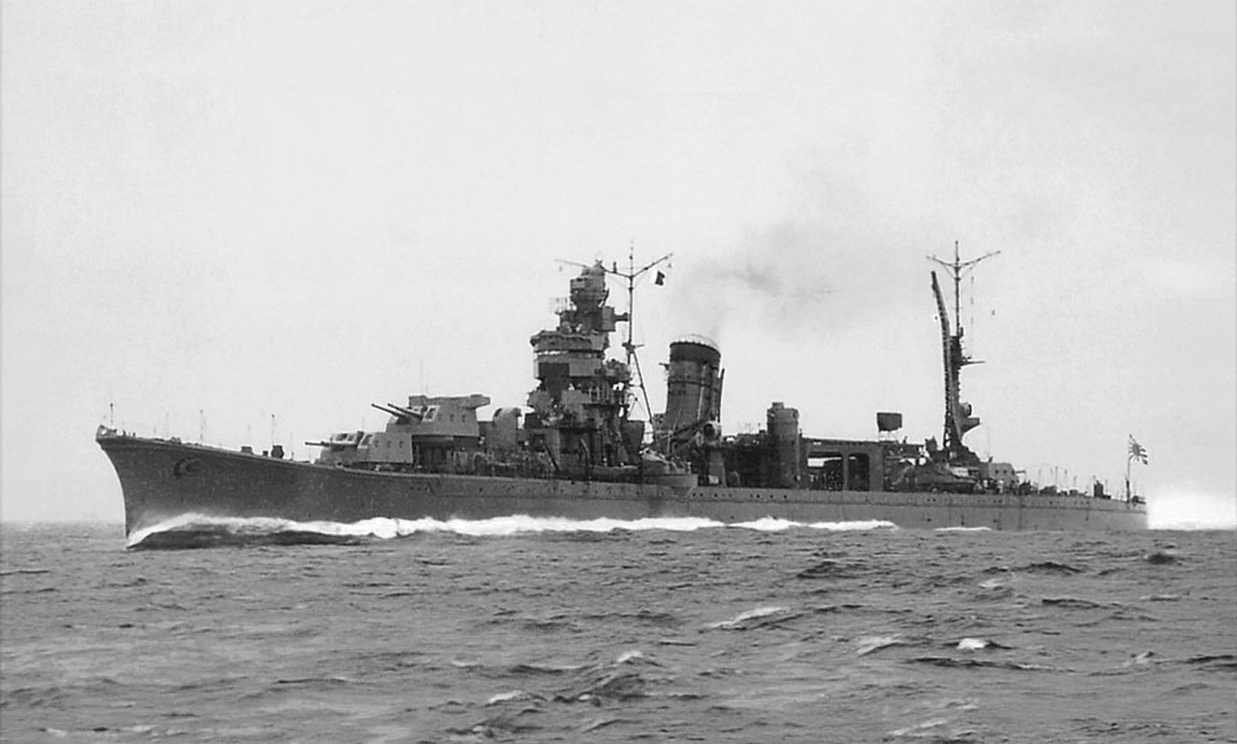
Light cruiser Noshiro

Sortied 12 June from Batjan anchorage off SW Halmahera Island
Vice Admiral Takeo Kurita in heavy cruiser Atago

Carrier Division 3 (Rear Adm. Sueo Obayashi)

3 light carriers

Chitose
Chiyoda
Zuihō
Air Unit

62 Mitsubishi A6M "Zeke" fighters
17 Nakajima B5N "Kate" torpedo bombers
9 Nakajima B6N "Jill" torpedo bombers

Battleship Division 1 (Vice Adm. Matome Ugaki)

2 super battleships: Yamato, Musashi

Battleship Division 3 (Vice Adm. Yoshio Suzuki)

2 old battleships: Kongō, Haruna

Cruiser Division 4 (Vice Adm. Kurita)

4 heavy cruisers: Atago, Chōkai, Maya, Takao

Cruiser Division 7 (Vice Adm. Kazutaka Shiraishi)

4 heavy cruisers: Kumano, Suzuya, Chikuma, Tone

Screen (Rear Adm. Mikio Hayakawa in Noshiro)

1 light cruiser: Noshiro
1 super destroyer (41 knots, 15 torpedo tubes): Shimakaze
8 destroyers:

7 Yūgumo-class (6 × 5 in. main battery): Kishinami, Okinami, Naganami, Asashimo, Tamanami, Hayanami (sunk by submarine 7 June), Fujinami

=== Supply Forces ===
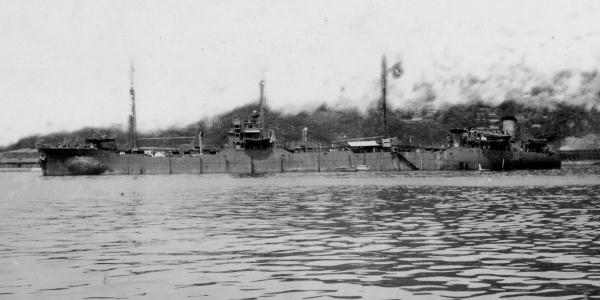
Ose, typical Japanese oiler, at Sasebo naval base in 1943

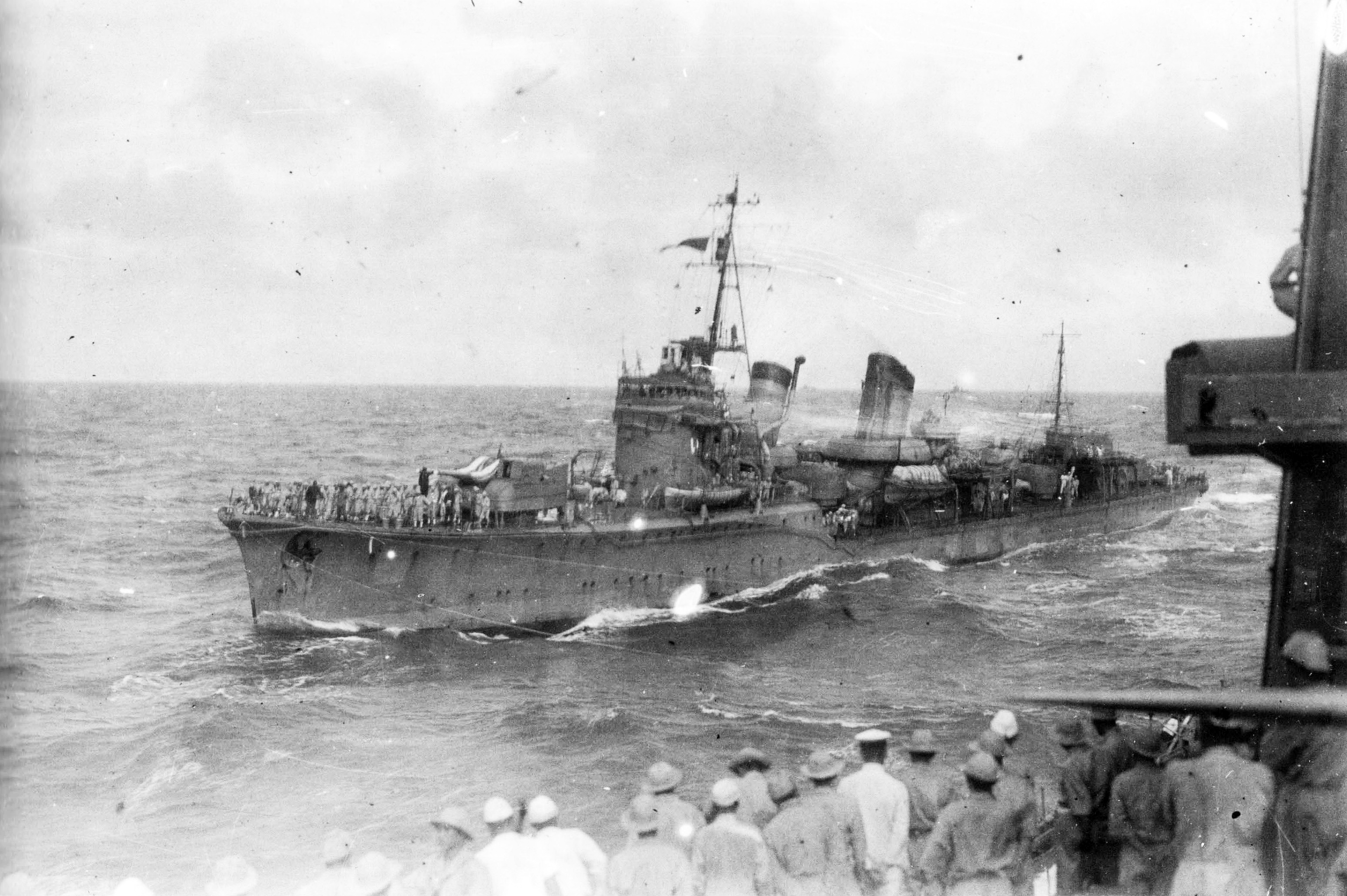
Destroyer Hibiki underway in 1941

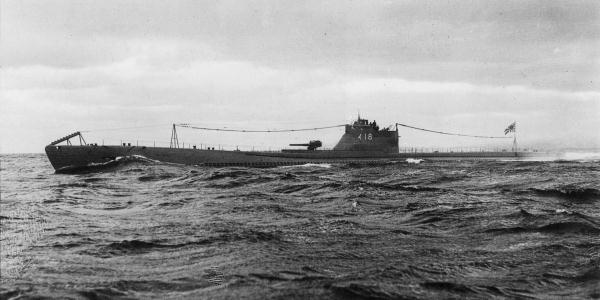
I-class submarine

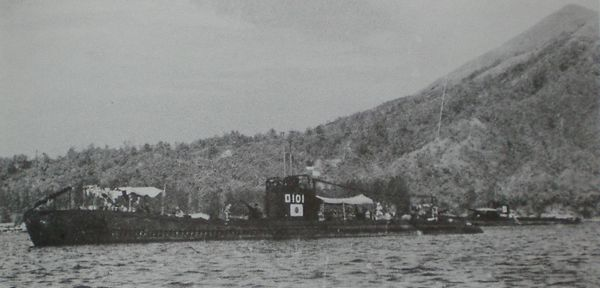
Ro-class submarine

Sortied with Ozawa's carrier forces 13 June from Tawi Tawi anchorage off NE Borneo

1st Supply Force

4 oilers

Hayasui, Nichiei Maru, Kokuyo Maru, Seiyo Maru (sunk 20 June)

4 destroyers

1 Fubuki class (6 × 5 in. main battery): Hibiki
1 Hatsuharu class (5 × 5 in. main battery): Hatsushimo
1 Kamikaze class (4 × 4.7 in. main battery): Yūnagi
1 Momi class (3 × 4.7 in. main battery): Tsuga

2nd Supply Force

2 oilers

Genyo Maru (sunk 20 June), Azusa Maru

2 destroyers

1 Kagerō-class (6 × 5 in. main battery): Yukikaze
1 Mutsuki-class (4 × 4.7 in. main battery): Uzuki

=== Submarine Forces ===
Vice Admiral Takeo Takagi at Saipan

7 1st-class submarines

I-5 (sunk by depth charges 19 July), I-10 (sunk by depth charges 4 July), I-38, I-41, I-53, I-184 (sunk by aircraft 19 June), I-185 (sunk by depth charges 22 June)

Deployed in two parallel rows SW to NE north of the Admiralties and Bismarcks
17 2nd-class submarines (Note: Ro-104, Ro-105, Ro-106, Ro-108, Ro-116 all sunk by destroyer escort England)

Ro-36 (sunk by depth charges 13 June), Ro-41, Ro-42 (sunk by depth charges 10 June), Ro-43, Ro-44 (sunk by depth charges 16 June), Ro-47, Ro-68, Ro-104 (sunk by depth charges 23 May), Ro-105 (sunk by depth charges 31 May), Ro-106 (sunk by depth charges 22 May), Ro-108 (sunk by depth charges 26 May), Ro-112, Ro-113, Ro-114 (sunk by depth charges 17 June), Ro-115, Ro-116 (sunk by depth charges 23 May), Ro-117 (sunk by depth charges 17 June)

== American order of battle ==
Fleet and Fast Carrier commanders

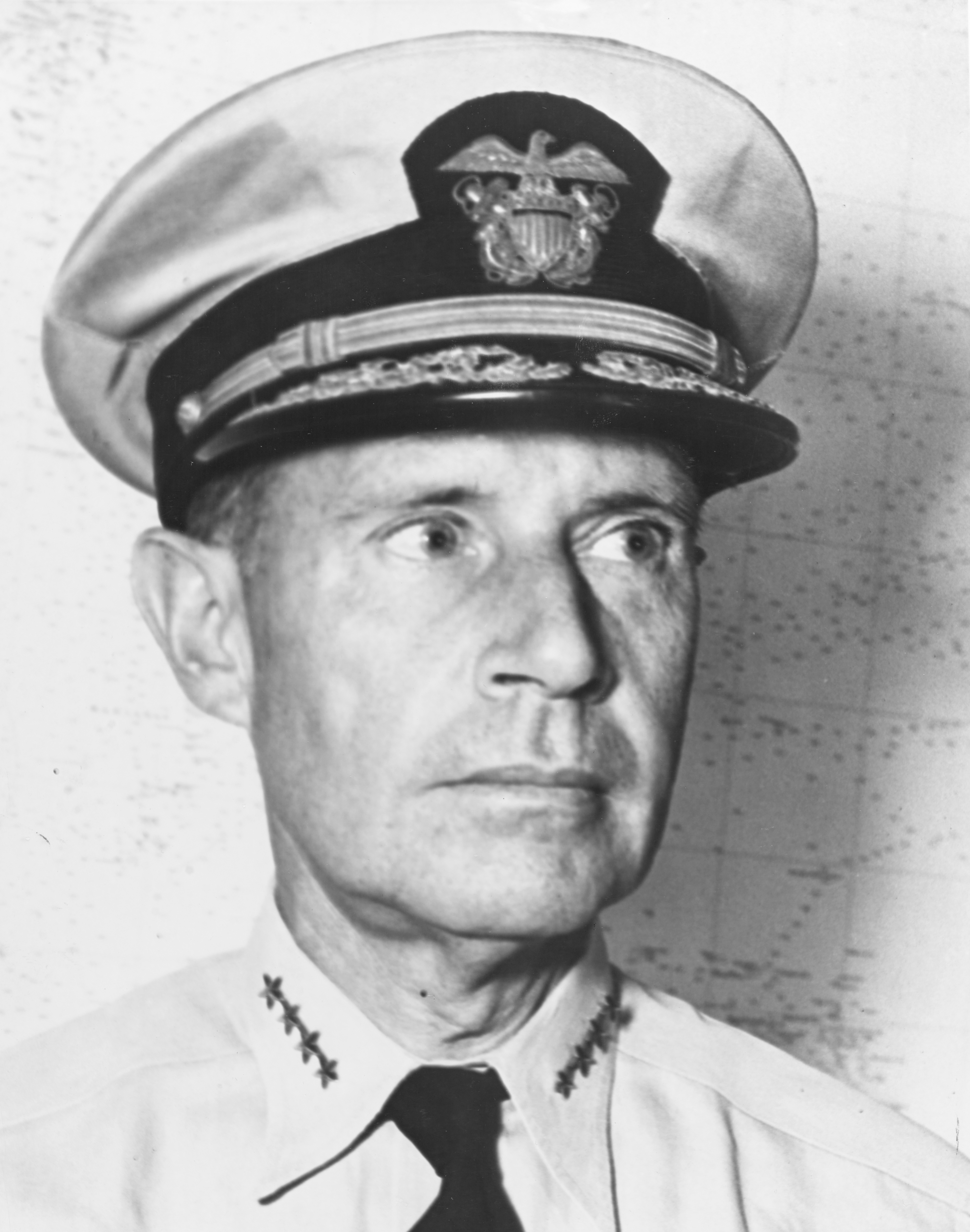
Adm. Raymond A. Spruance

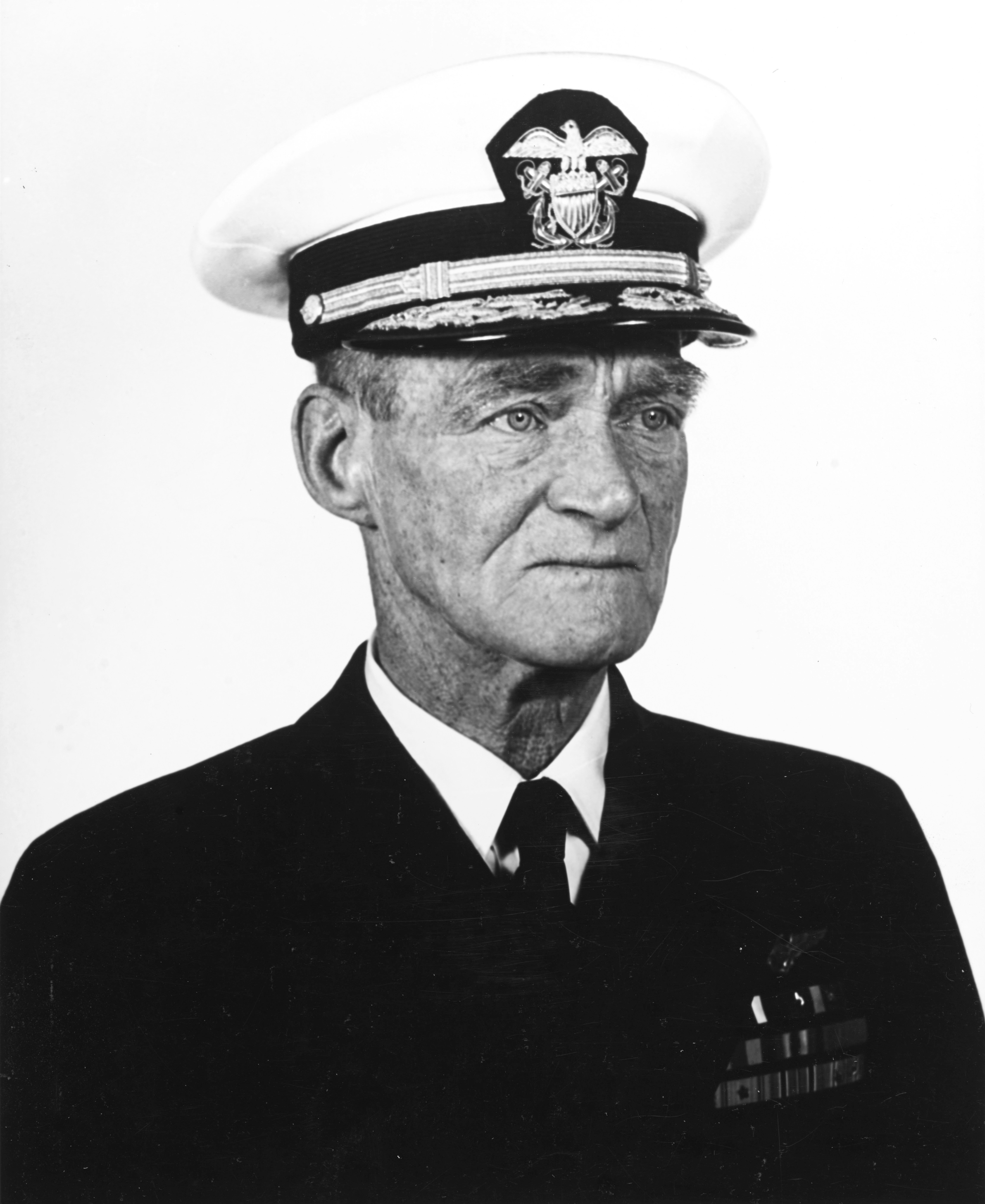
Vice Adm. Marc A. Mitscher

US Fifth Fleet
Admiral Raymond A. Spruance in heavy cruiser Indianapolis

Task Force 58 – Fast Carrier Forces
Vice Admiral Marc A. Mitscher in fleet carrier Lexington

=== Task Group 58.1 ===
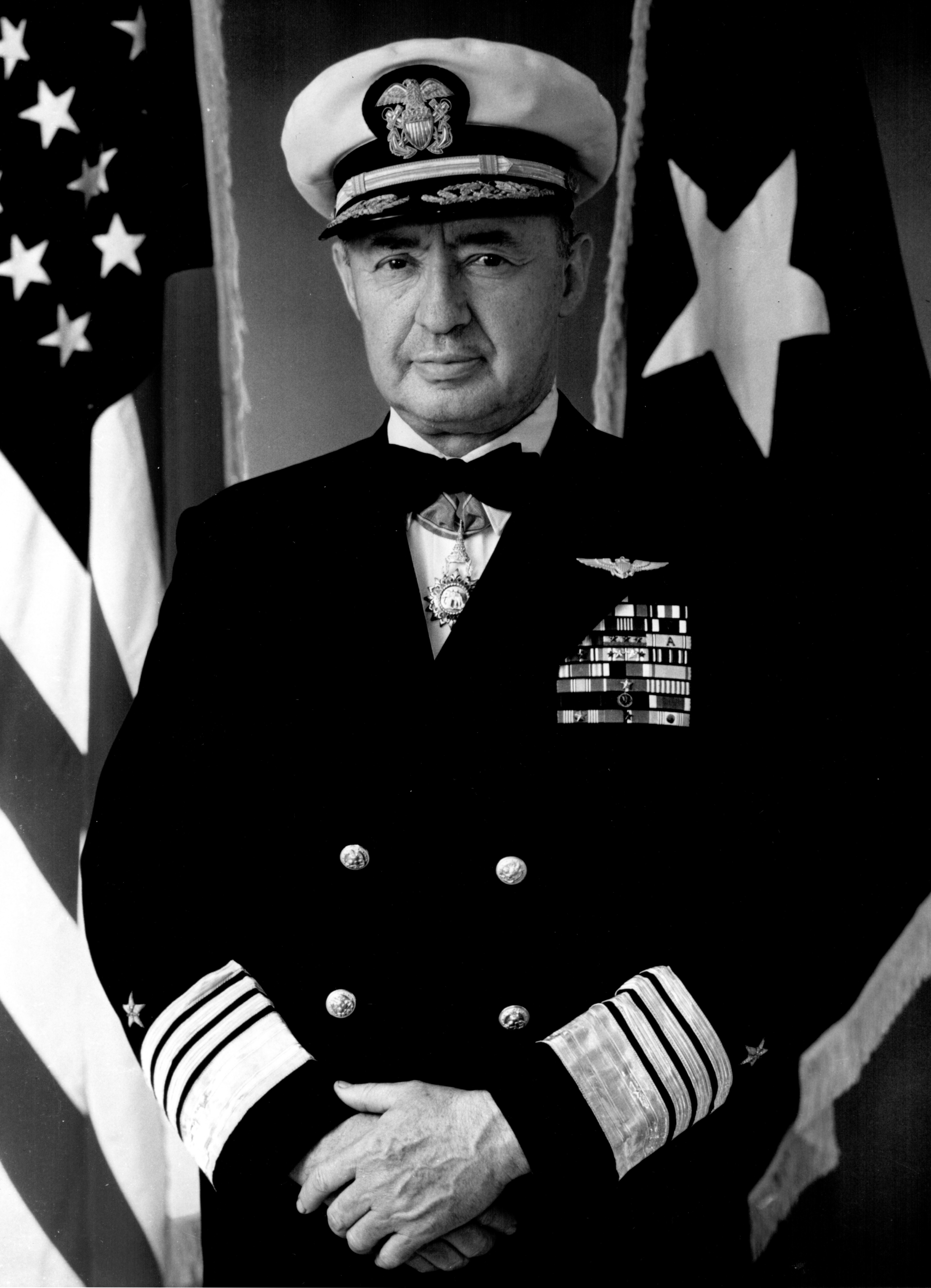
Rear Adm. Joseph J. Clark

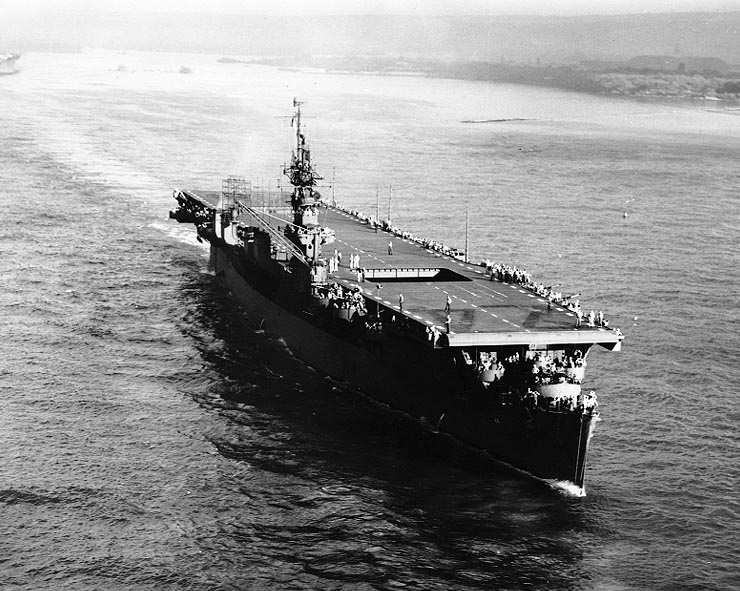
Light carrier Belleau Wood

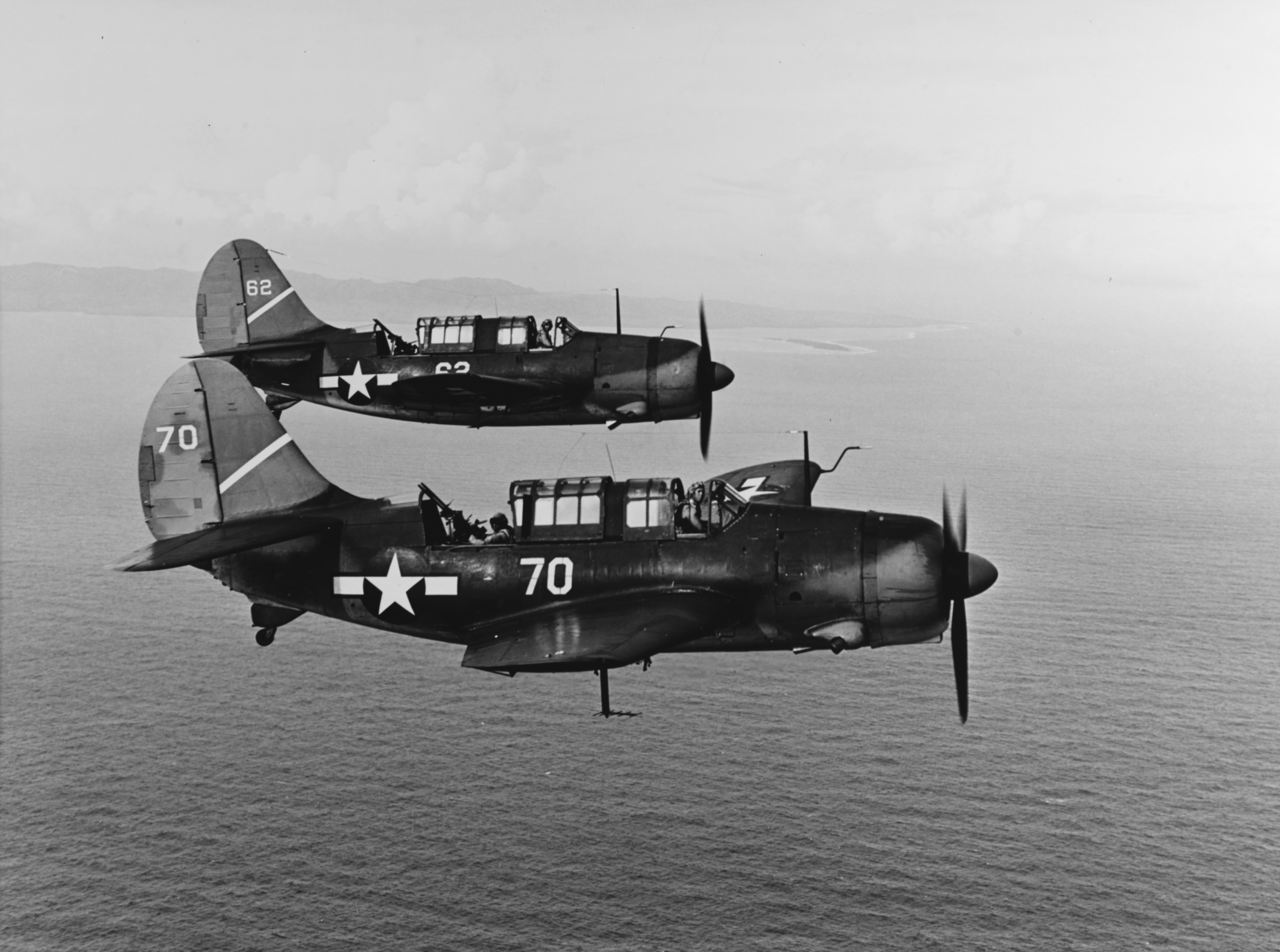
Curtiss SB2C Helldiver dive bombers

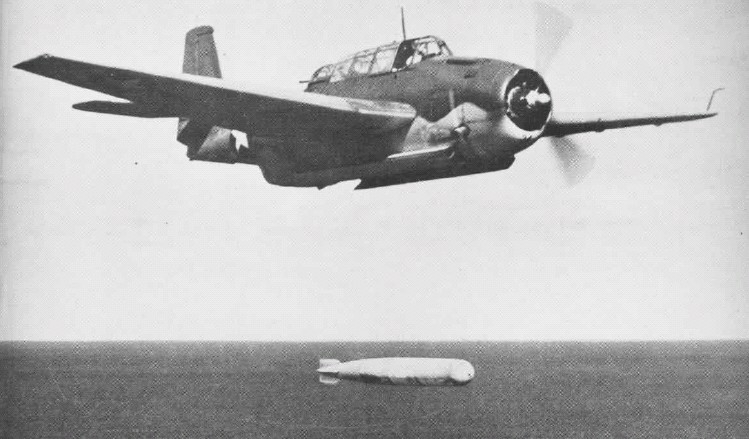
Grumman TBF Avenger torpedo bomber

Carrier Division 13
Rear Admiral Joseph J. Clark

2 fleet carriers

Hornet (Capt. William D. Sample)

Air Group 2 (Cmdr. Jackson D. Arnold)

36 F6F Hellcat fighters (Lt. Cmdr. W.A. Dean)
33 SB2C Helldiver dive bombers (Lt. Cmdr. G.B. Campbell)
18 TBF Avenger torpedo bombers (Lt. Cmdr. L.M.D. Ford)
4 F6F-xN Hellcat night fighters (Lt. R.L. Reiserer)

Yorktown (Capt. Ralph E. Jennings)

Air Group 1 (Cmdr. J.M. Peters)

41 F6F Hellcat fighters (Lt. Cmdr. B.M. Strean)
40 SB2C Helldiver, 4 SBD-5 Dauntless dive bombers (Lt. Cmdr. J.W. Runyan, USNR)
17 TBF Avenger torpedo bombers (Lt. Cmdr. W.F. Henry)
4 F6F-xN Hellcat night fighters (Lt. A.C. Benjes)

2 light carriers

Belleau Wood (Capt. John Perry)

Air Group 24 (Cmdr. E.M. Link)

26 F6F Hellcat fighters (Lt. Cmdr. Link)
9 TBF Avenger torpedo bombers (Lt. R.M. Swensson)

Bataan (Capt. Valentine H. Schaeffer)

Air Group 50 (Lt. Cmdr. J.C. Strange, USNR)

24 F6F Hellcat fighters (Lt. Cmdr. Strange)
9 TBF Avenger torpedo bombers (Lt. Cmdr. L.V. Swanson)

Cruiser Division 10 (Rear Admiral Leo H. Thebaud)

3 heavy cruisers

Baltimore (Capt. W.C. Calhoun)
Boston (Capt. E.E. Herrmann)
Canberra (Capt. A.R. Early)

Screen

2 anti-aircraft light cruisers (Note: These cruisers were intended as destroyer leaders when designed. After the first two to be used in this role, Atlanta and Juneau, were lost at the Naval Battle of Guadalcanal, this mission was rejected and the anti-aircraft mission adopted.) (Rear Admiral Thebaud)

San Juan (Capt. Guy W. Clark)
Oakland (Capt. William K. Phillips)

14 destroyers (Capt. Clark)

9 Fletcher-class (5 × 5 in. main battery): Bell, Boyd, Bradford, Brown, Burns, Charrette, Conner, Cowell, Izard
4 Gridley-class (4 × 5 in. main battery): Craven, Gridley, Maury, McCall
1 Bagley-class (4 × 5 in. main battery): Helm

=== Task Group 58.2 ===
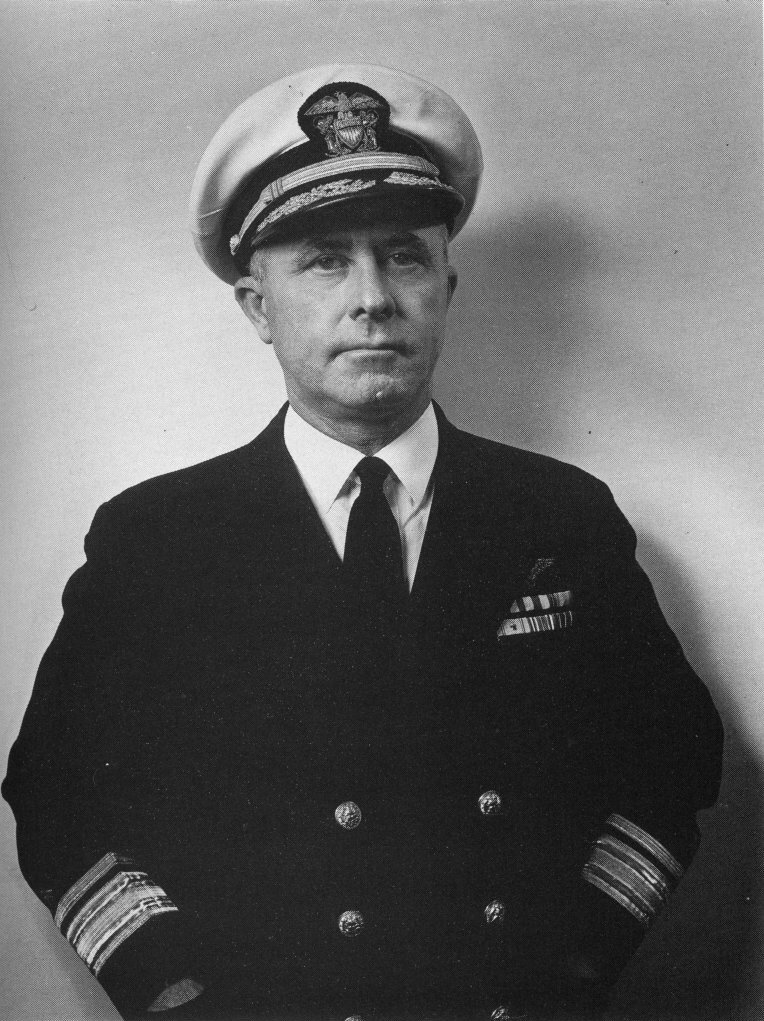
Rear Adm. Alfred E. Montgomery

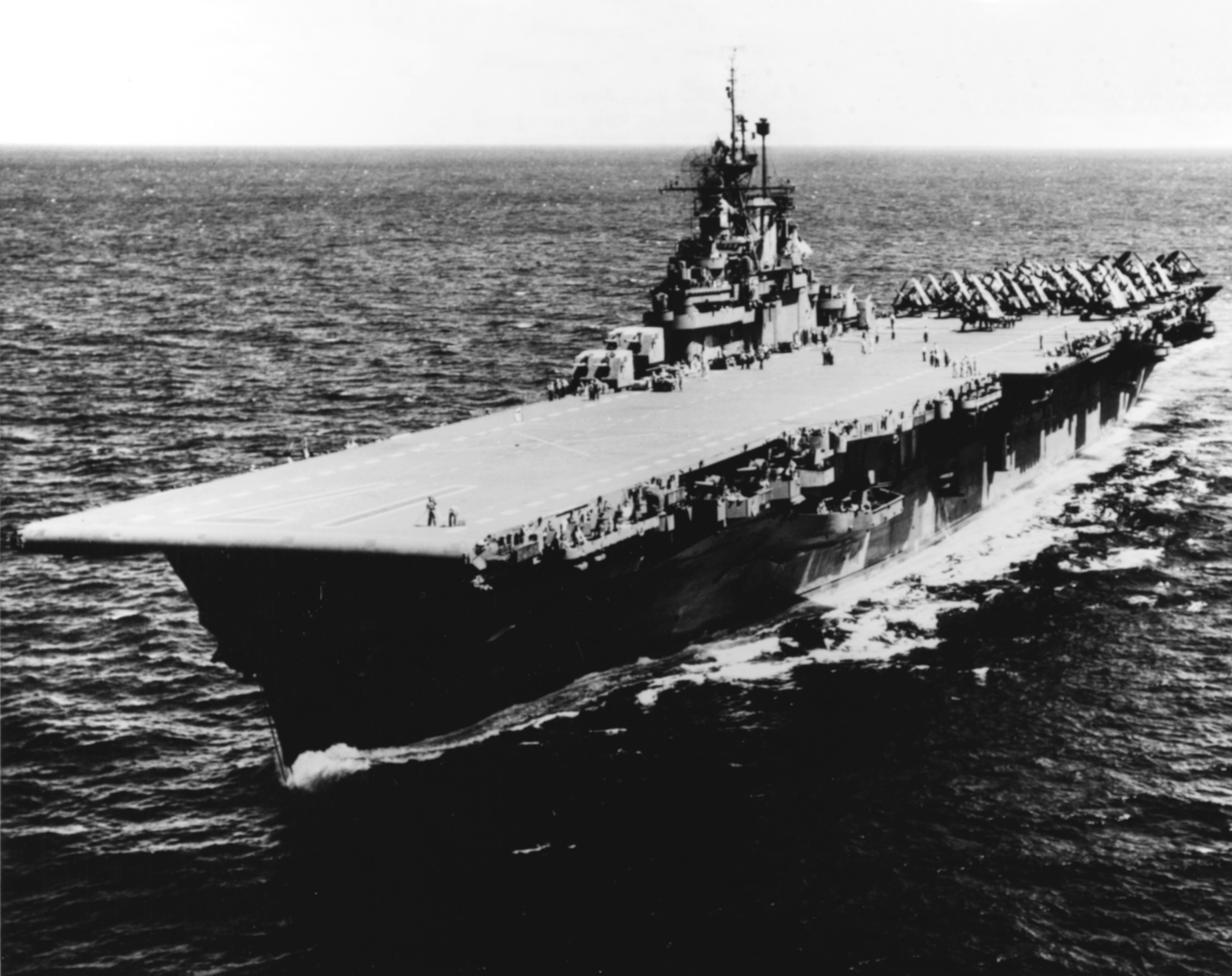
Fleet carrier Bunker Hill in 1945

Light carrier Cabot in 1945

Carrier Division 3
Rear Admiral Alfred E. Montgomery

2 fleet carriers

Bunker Hill (Capt. T.P. Jeter)

Air Group 8 (Cmdr. R.L. Shifley)

37 F6F Hellcat fighters (Lt. Cmdr. W.M. Collins)
33 SB2C Helldiver dive bombers (Lt. Cmdr. J.D. Arbes)
18 TBF Avenger, torpedo bombers (Lt. Cmdr. K.F. Musick)
4 F6F-xN Hellcat night fighters (Lt. Cmdr. Evan P. Aurand)

Wasp (Capt. Clifton Sprague)

Air Group 14 (Cmdr. W.C. Wingard)

34 F6F Hellcat fighters (Lt. Cmdr. E.W. Biros, USNR)
32 SB2C Helldiver dive bombers (Lt. Cmdr. J.D. Blitch)
18 TBF Avenger torpedo bombers (Lt. Cmdr. H.S. Roberts, USNR)
4 F6F-xN Hellcat night fighters (Lt. J.H. Boyum)

2 light carriers

Cabot (Capt. S.J. Michael)

Air Group 31 (Lt. Cmdr. R.A. Winston)

24 F6F Hellcat fighters (Lt. Cmdr. Winston)
9 TBF Avenger torpedo bombers (Lt. E.E. Wood, USNR)

Monterey (Capt. Stuart H. Ingersoll)

Air Group 28 (Lt. Cmdr. R.W. Mehle, USNR)

21 F6F Hellcat fighters (Lt. Cmdr. Mehle)
8 TBF Avenger torpedo bombers (Lt. Cmdr. R.P. Gift, USNR)

1 heavy cruiser

Minneapolis (Capt. Harry Slocum)

Cruiser Division 13 (Rear Admiral Laurance T. DuBose)

3 light cruisers

Santa Fe (Capt. Jerauld Wright)
Mobile (Capt. Charles J. Wheeler)
Biloxi (Capt. Daniel M. McGurl)

Screen

12 destroyers

9 Fletcher-class (5 × 5 in. main battery): Hickox, Hunt, Lewis Hancock, Marshall, Miller, Owen, Stephen Potter, The Sullivans, Tingey
3 Farragut-class (4 × 5 in. main battery): Dewey, Hull, MacDonough

=== Task Group 58.3 ===
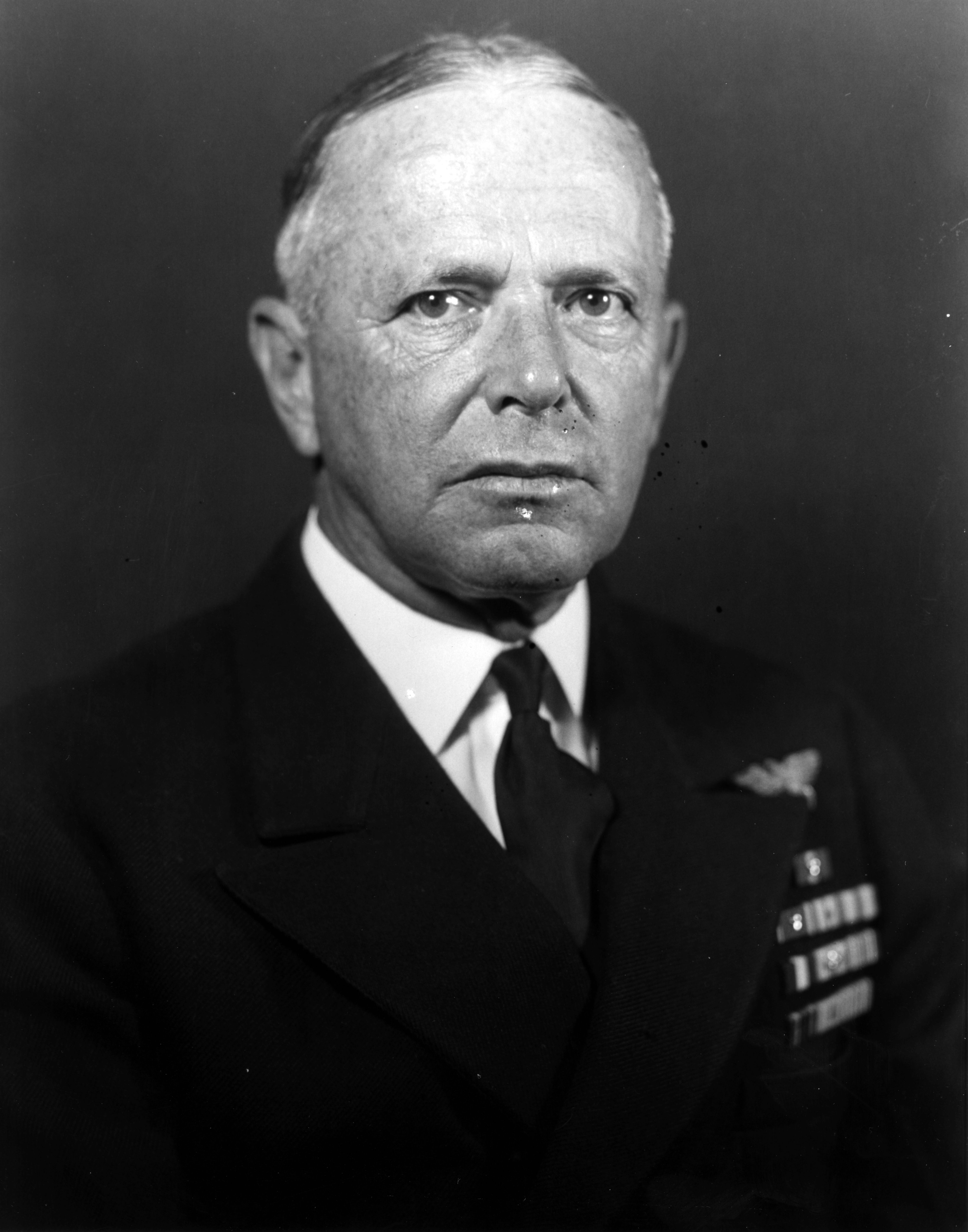
Rear Adm. John W. Reeves

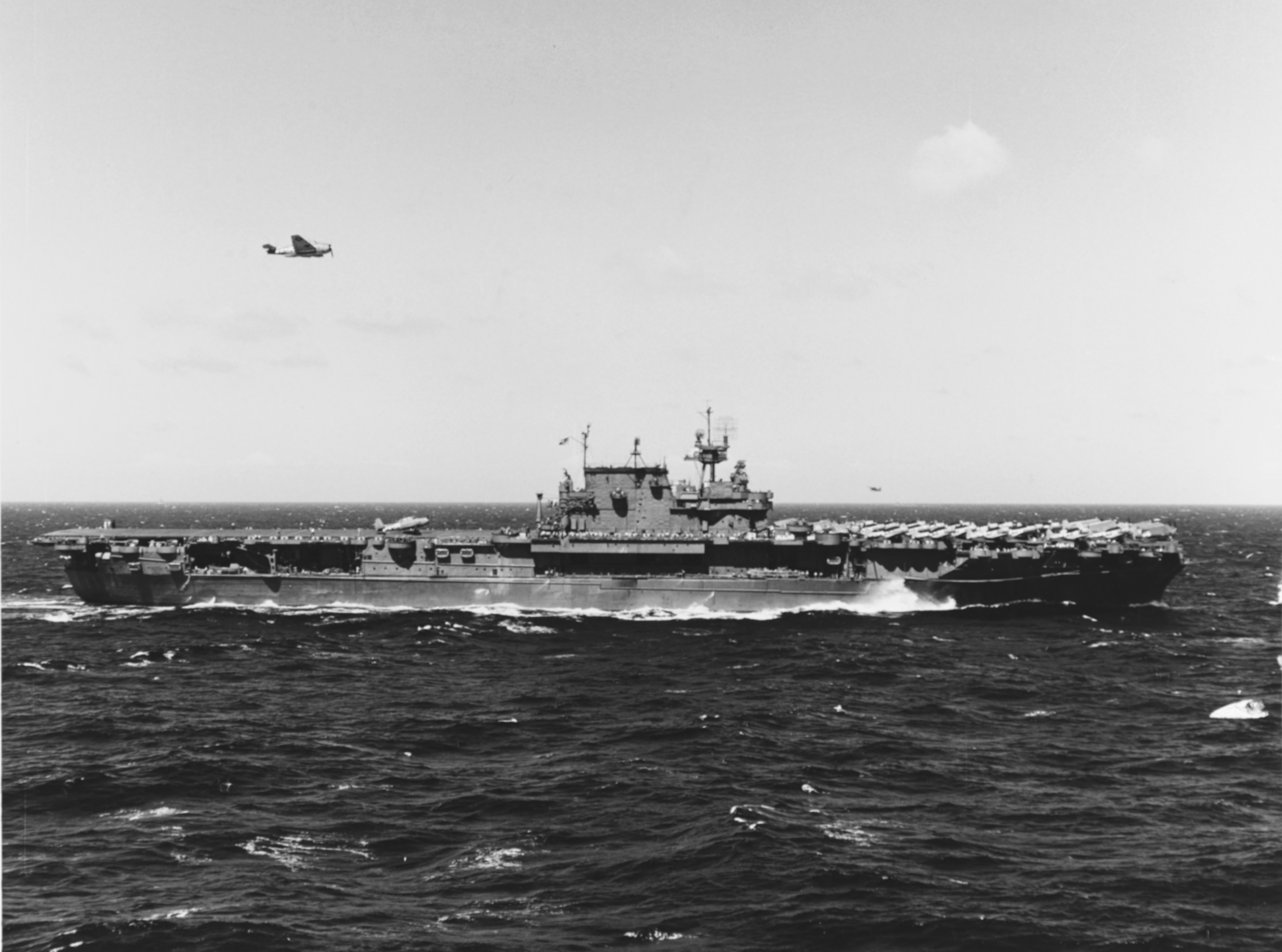
Fleet carrier Enterprise underway November 1943

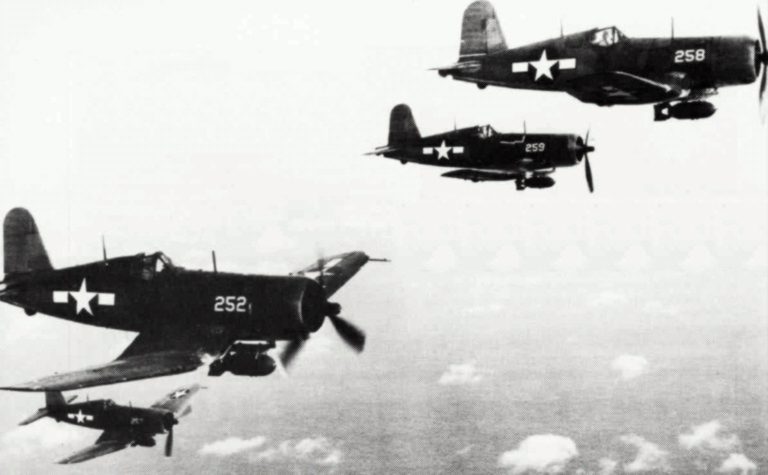
Marine Corps Corsairs in 1944

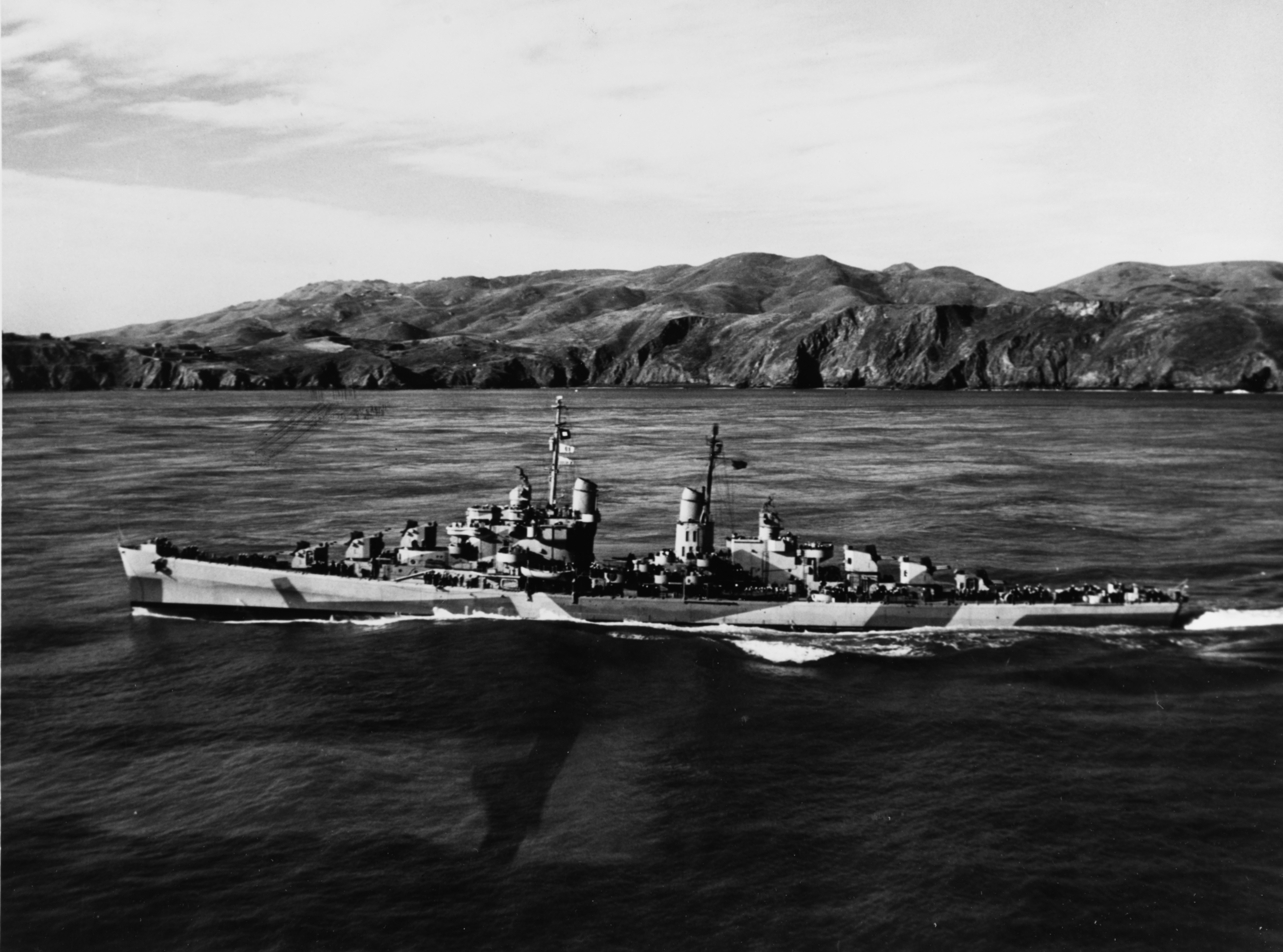
Anti-aircraft light cruiser Reno off California January 1944

Carrier Division 2
Rear Admiral John W. Reeves

2 fleet carriers

Enterprise (Capt. Matthias B. Gardner)

Air Group 10 (Cmdr. William R. Kane)

31 F6F Hellcat fighters (Lt. R.W. Schumann)
21 SBD Dauntless dive bombers (Lt. Cmdr. James D. Ramage)
14 TBF Avenger torpedo bombers (Lt. Cmdr. W.I. Martin)
3 F4U Corsair night fighters (Lt. Cmdr. R.E. Harmer)

Lexington (Capt. E.W. Litch)

Air Group 16 (Cmdr. E.M. Snowden)

37 F6F Hellcat fighters (Lt. Cmdr. Ralph Weymouth)
34 SBD Dauntless dive bombers (Lt. Cmdr. Weymouth)
18 TBF Avenger torpedo bombers (Lt. Cmdr. N.A. Sterrie, USNR)
4 F6F-xN Hellcat fighters (Lt. W.H. Abercrombie, USNR)

2 light carriers

San Jacinto (Capt. Harold M. Martin)

Air Group 51 (Lt. Cmdr. C.L. Moore)

24 F6F Hellcat fighters (Lt. Cmdr. Moore)
8 TBF Avenger torpedo bombers (Lt. Cmdr. D.J. Melvin)

Princeton (Capt. W.H. Buracker)

Air Group 27 (Lt. Cmdr. E.W. Wood – KIA)

24 F6F Hellcat fighters (Lt. Cmdr. Wood)
9 TBF Avenger torpedo bombers (Lt. Cmdr. S.M. Haley, USNR)

1 heavy cruiser

Indianapolis (Capt. E.R. Johnson)

Cruiser Division 12 (Rear Admiral Robert W. Hayler)

3 light cruisers

Montpelier (Capt. H.D. Hoffman)
Cleveland (Capt. A.G. Shepard)
Birmingham (Capt. Thomas B. Inglis)

Screen

1 anti-aircraft light cruiser

Reno (Capt. R.C. Alexander)

13 destroyers

All Fletcher-class (5 × 5 in. main battery): Anthony, Braine, Caperton, Clarence K. Bronson, Cogswell, Cotten, Dortch, Gatling, Healy, Ingersoll, Knapp, Terry, Wadsworth

=== Task Group 58.4 ===
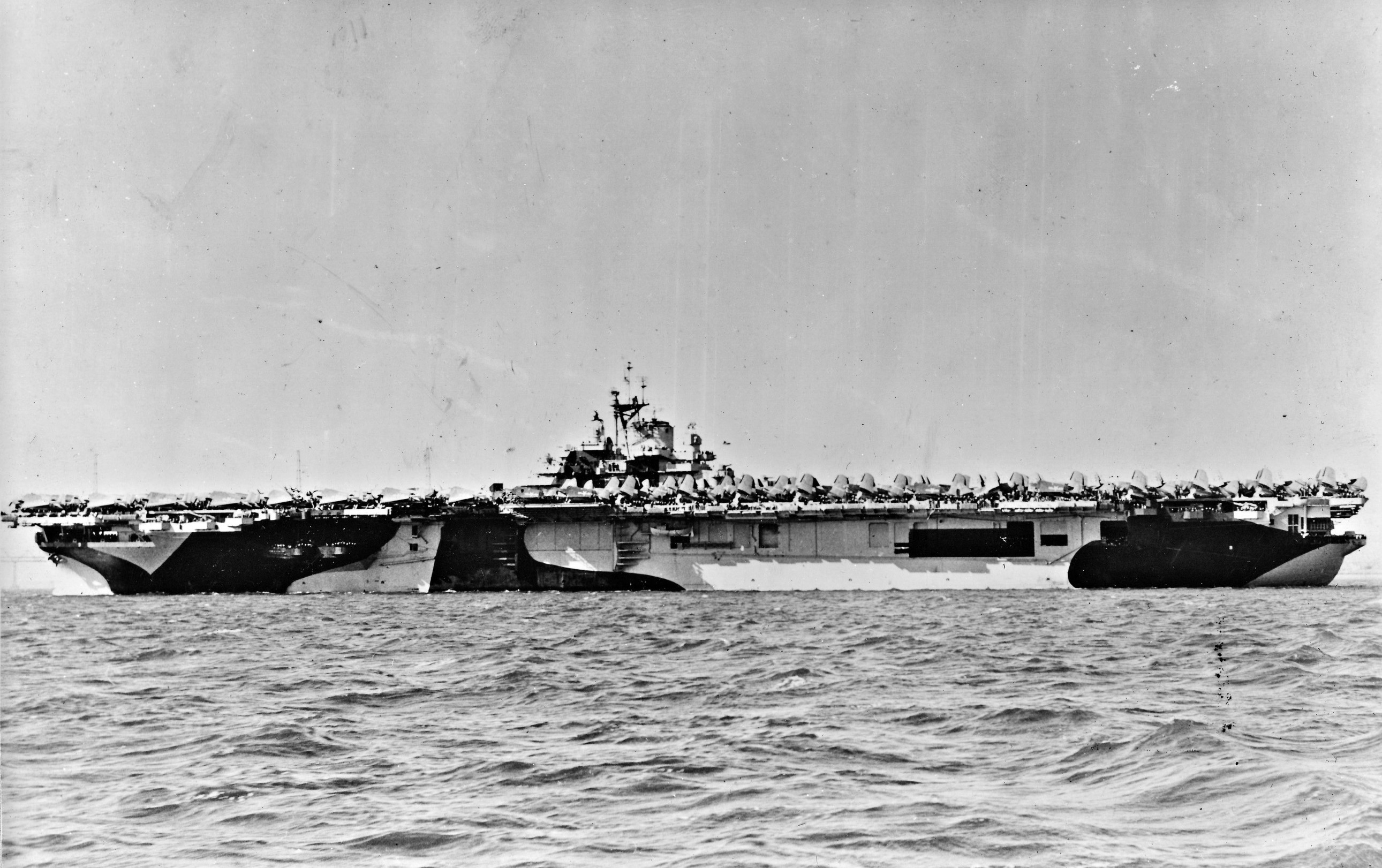
Fleet carrier Essex outfitted in dazzle camouflage

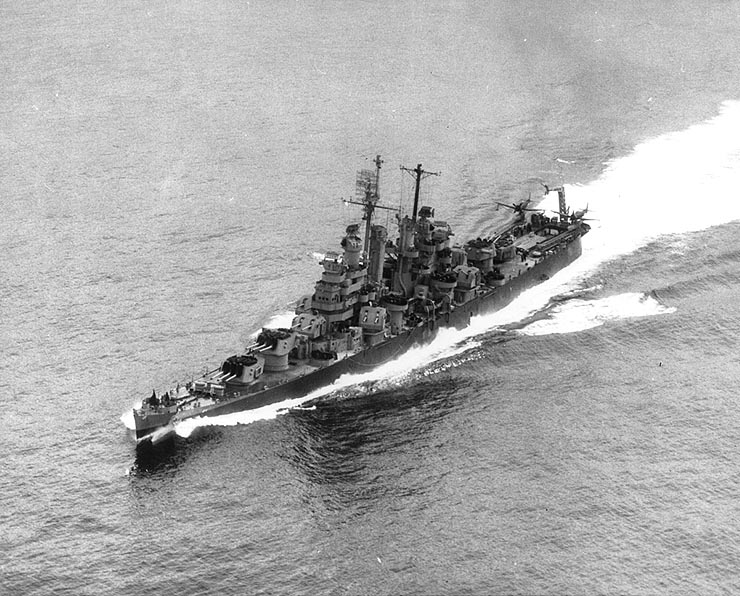
Light cruiser Vincennes in San Francisco Bay in 1945

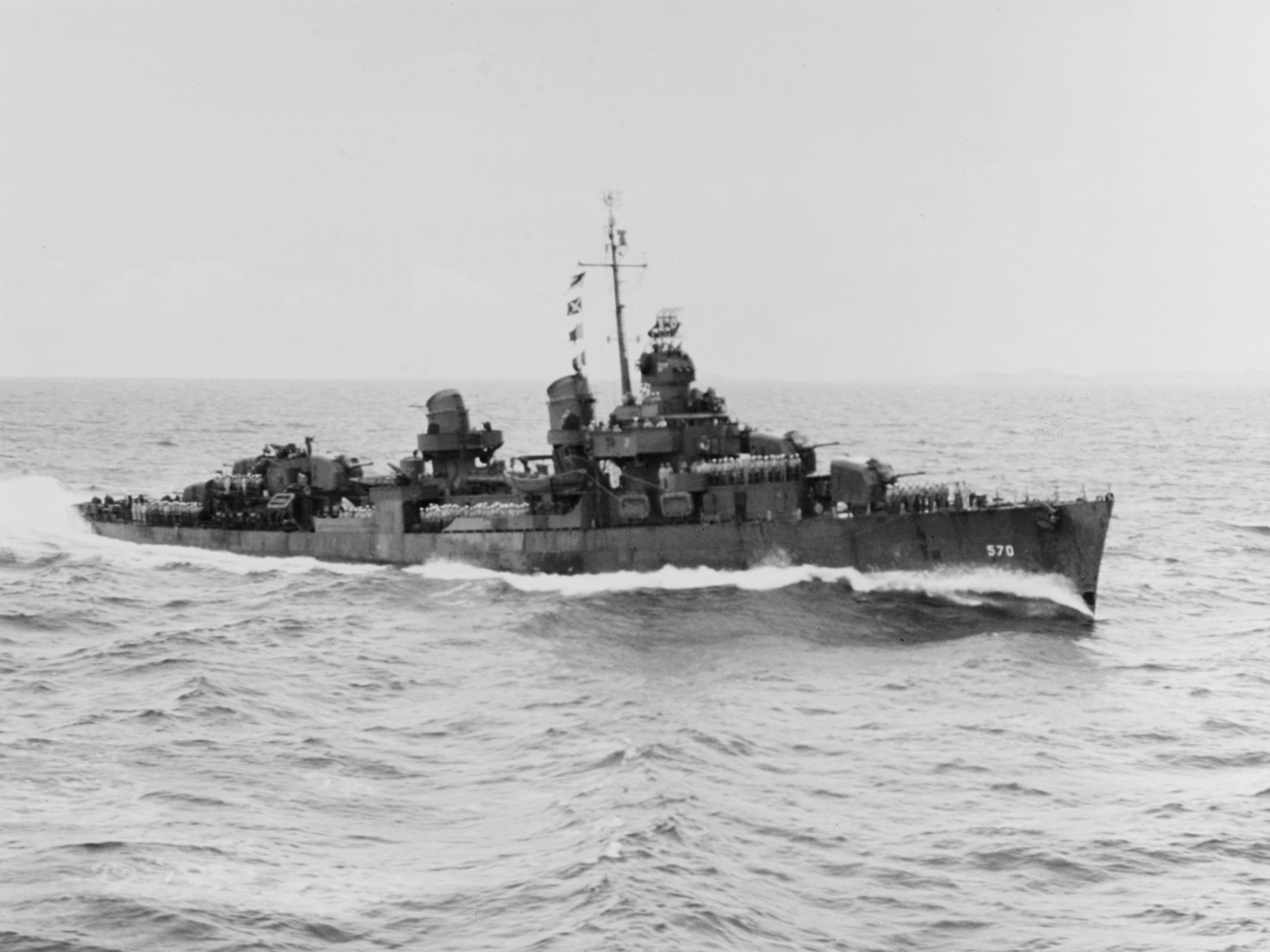
Fletcher-class destroyer Charles Ausburne underway

Carrier Division 12
Rear Admiral William K. Harrill

1 fleet carrier

Essex (Capt. Ralph A. Ofstie)

Air Group 15 (Cmdr. David McCampbell)

38 F6F Hellcat fighters (Lt. Cmdr. C.W. Brewer -- KIA)
36 SB2C Helldiver dive bombers (Lt. Cmdr. J.H. Mini)
20 TBF Avenger torpedo bombers (Lt. Cmdr. V.G. Lambert)
4 F6F-xN Hellcat night fighters (Lt. R.M. Freeman)

2 light carriers

Langley (Capt. W.M. Dillon)

Air Group 32 (Lt. Cmdr. E.C. Outlaw)

23 F6F Hellcat fighters (Lt. Cmdr. Outlaw)
9 TBF Avenger torpedo bombers (Lt. D.A. Marks)

Cowpens (Capt. H.W. Taylor)

Air Group 25 (Lt. Cmdr. R.H. Price)

23 F6F Hellcat fighters (Lt. Cmdr. Price)
9 TBF Avenger torpedo bombers (Lt. R.B. Cottingham, USNR)

Cruiser Division 14 (Rear admiral Wilder D. Baker)

3 light cruisers

Vincennes (Capt. A.D. Brown)
Houston (Capt. W.W. Behrens)
Miami (Capt. J.G. Crawford)

Screen

1 anti-aircraft light cruiser

San Diego (Capt. L.J. Hudson)

14 destroyers

6 Fletcher-class (5 × 5 in. main battery): Charles Ausburne, Stanly, Dyson, Converse, Spence, Thatcher
1 Mahan-class (5 × 5 in. main battery): Case
3 Gleaves-class (4 × 5 in. main battery): Lansdowne, Lardner, McCalla
4 Benham-class (4 × 5 in. main battery): Lang, Sterett, Wilson, Ellet

=== Task Group 58.7 ===
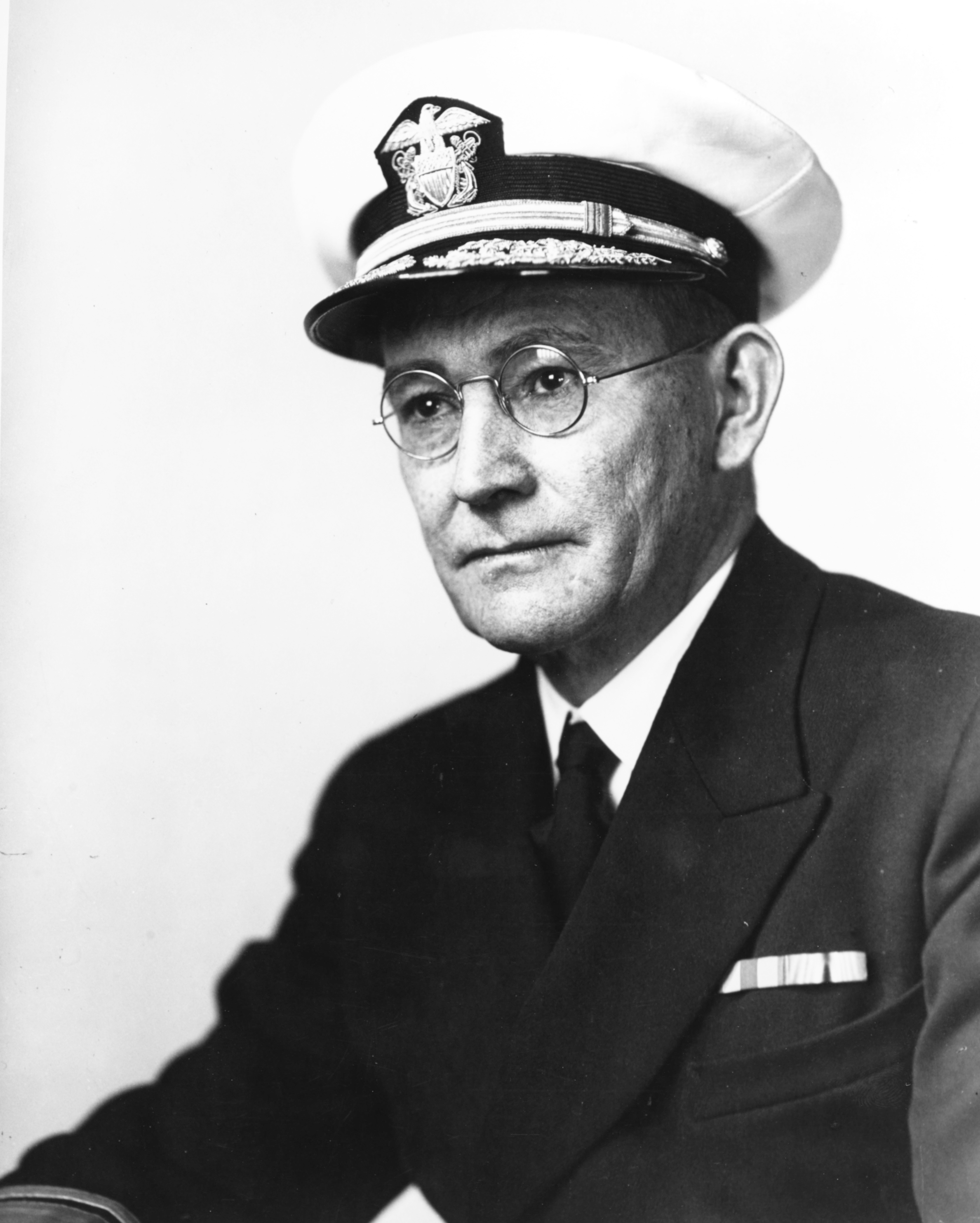
Vice Adm. Willis A. Lee

Fast battleships

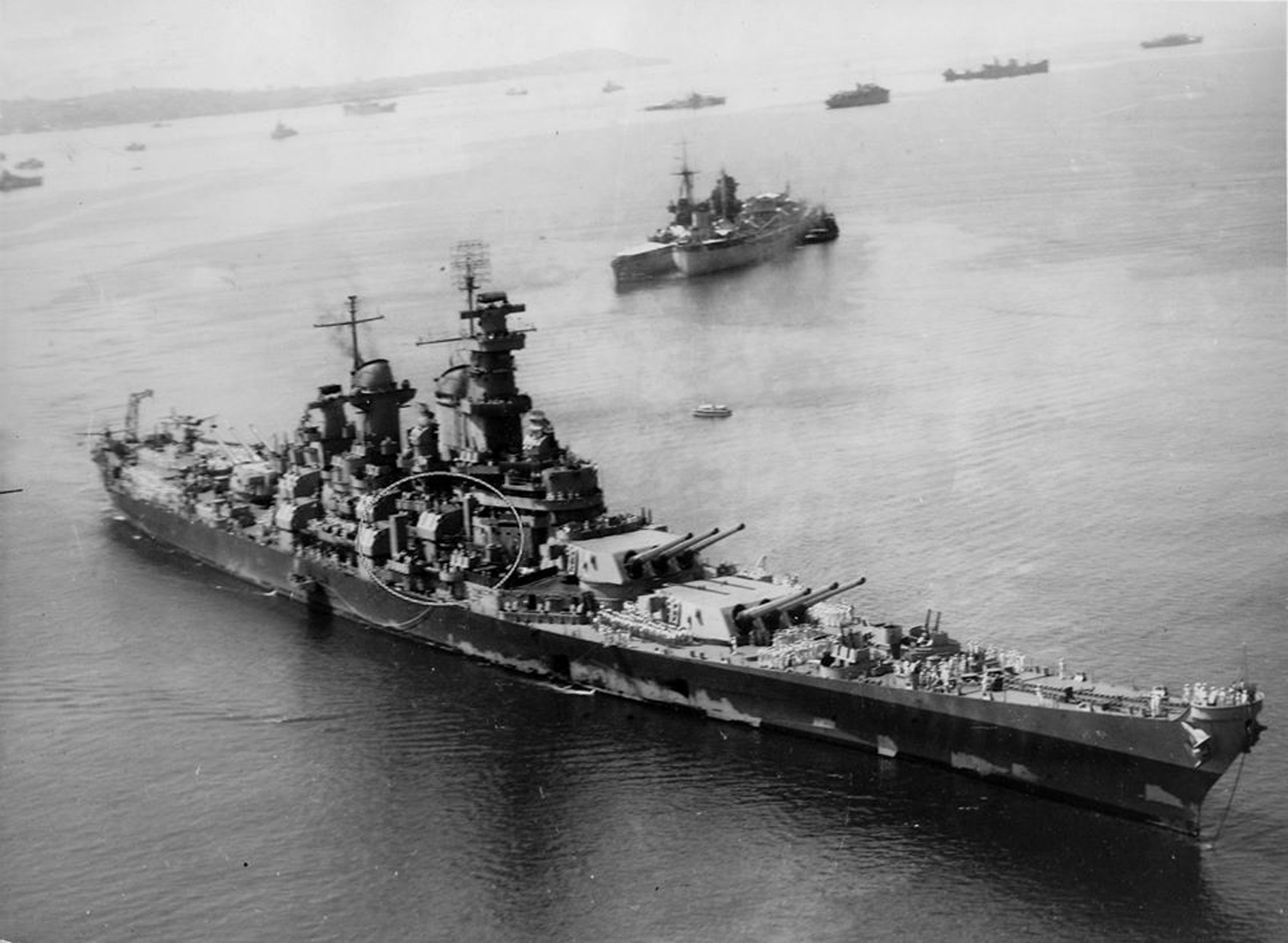
Iowa at anchor in Algeria

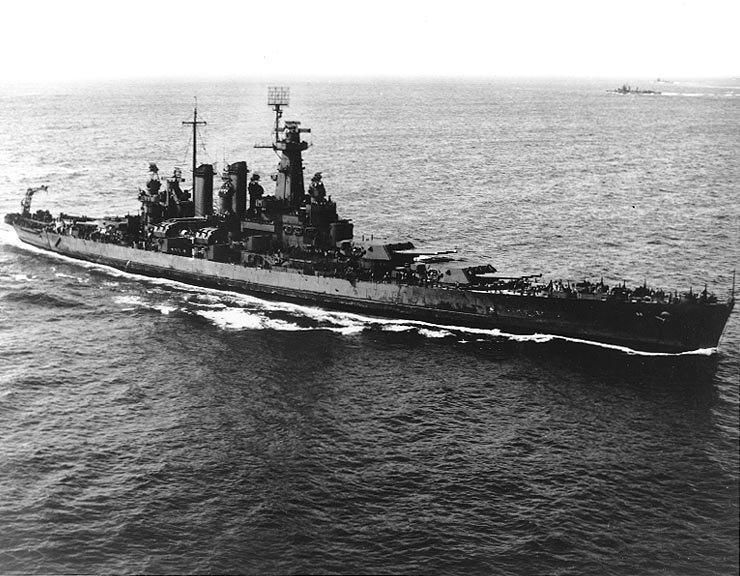
North Carolina underway

Destroyer Bagley

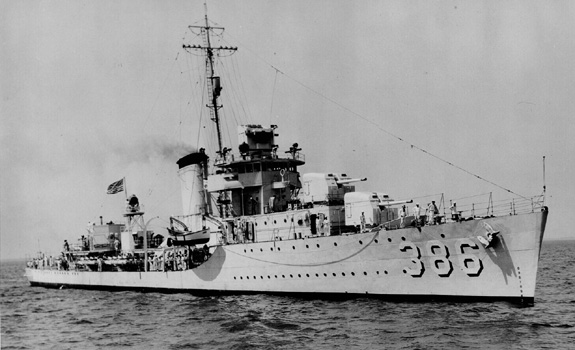
Before World War II

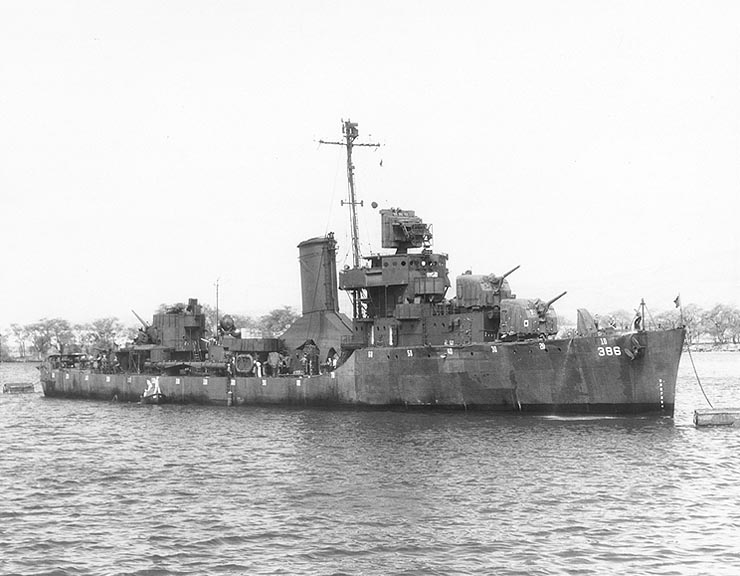
After World War II

Commander, Battleships, Pacific Fleet
Vice Admiral Willis Augustus Lee

Battleship Division 6 (Vice Admiral Lee)

2 North Carolina class

North Carolina (Capt. Frank P. Thomas)
Washington (Capt. Thomas R. Cooley)

Battleship Division 7 (Rear Admiral Olaf M. Hustvedt)

2 Iowa class

Iowa (Capt. John L. McCrea)
New Jersey (Capt. Carl F. Holden)

Battleship Division 8 (Rear Admiral Glenn B. Davis)

1 South Dakota class

Indiana (Capt. Thomas J. Keliher Jr.)

Battleship Division 9 (Rear Admiral Edward Hanson)

2 South Dakota class

South Dakota (Capt. Ralph S. Riggs)
Alabama (Capt. Fred D. Kirtland)

Cruiser Division 6 (Rear Admiral C. Turner Joy)

3 heavy cruisers

Wichita (Capt. J.J. Mahoney)
New Orleans (Capt. J.E. Hurff)
San Francisco (Capt. Harvey Overesch)

Screen

14 destroyers

1 Porter-class (8 × 5 in. main battery): Selfridge
9 Fletcher-class (5 × 5 in. main battery): Halford, Guest, Bennett, Fullam, Hudson, Yarnall, Twining, Stockham, Monssen
3 Bagley-class (4 × 5 in. main battery): Bagley, Mugford, Patterson
1 Mahan-class (5 × 5 in. main battery): Conyngham

=== Seventh Fleet Submarines ===
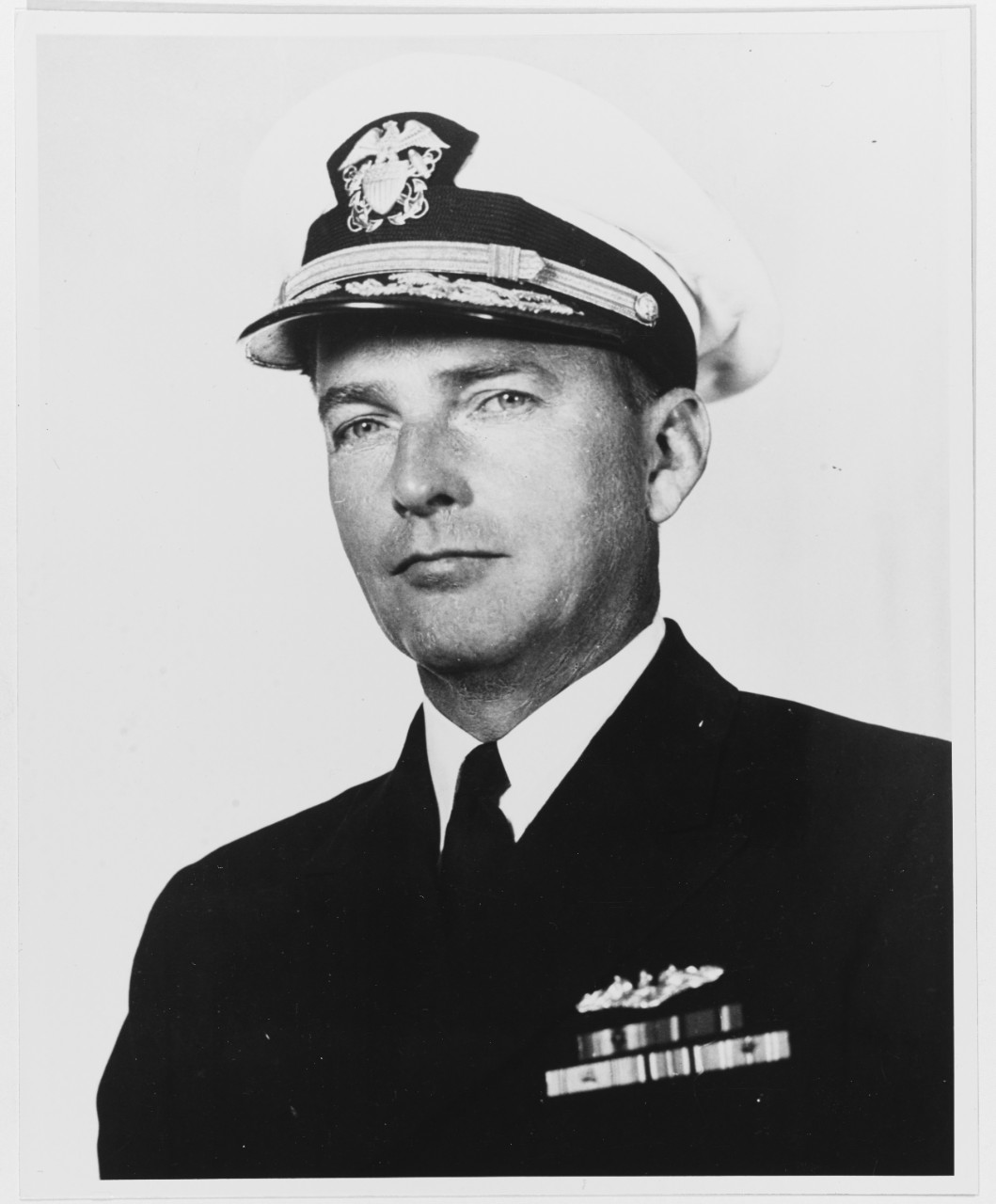
Rear Adm. Ralph W. Christie

Rear Admiral Ralph W. Christie (HQ at Fremantle)

Southeast of Mindanao

3 Gato-class (10 tubes: 6 forward, 4 aft): Hake, Bashaw, Paddle

IJN anchorage at Tawi Tawi

3 Gato-class (10 tubes: 6 forward, 4 aft): Harder, Haddo (Note: Skippered by Cmdr. Chester W. Nimitz, Jr.), Redfin

Off Luzon

2 Gato-class (10 tubes: 6 forward, 4 aft): Bluefish, Jack, Flier

=== Task Force 17 ===
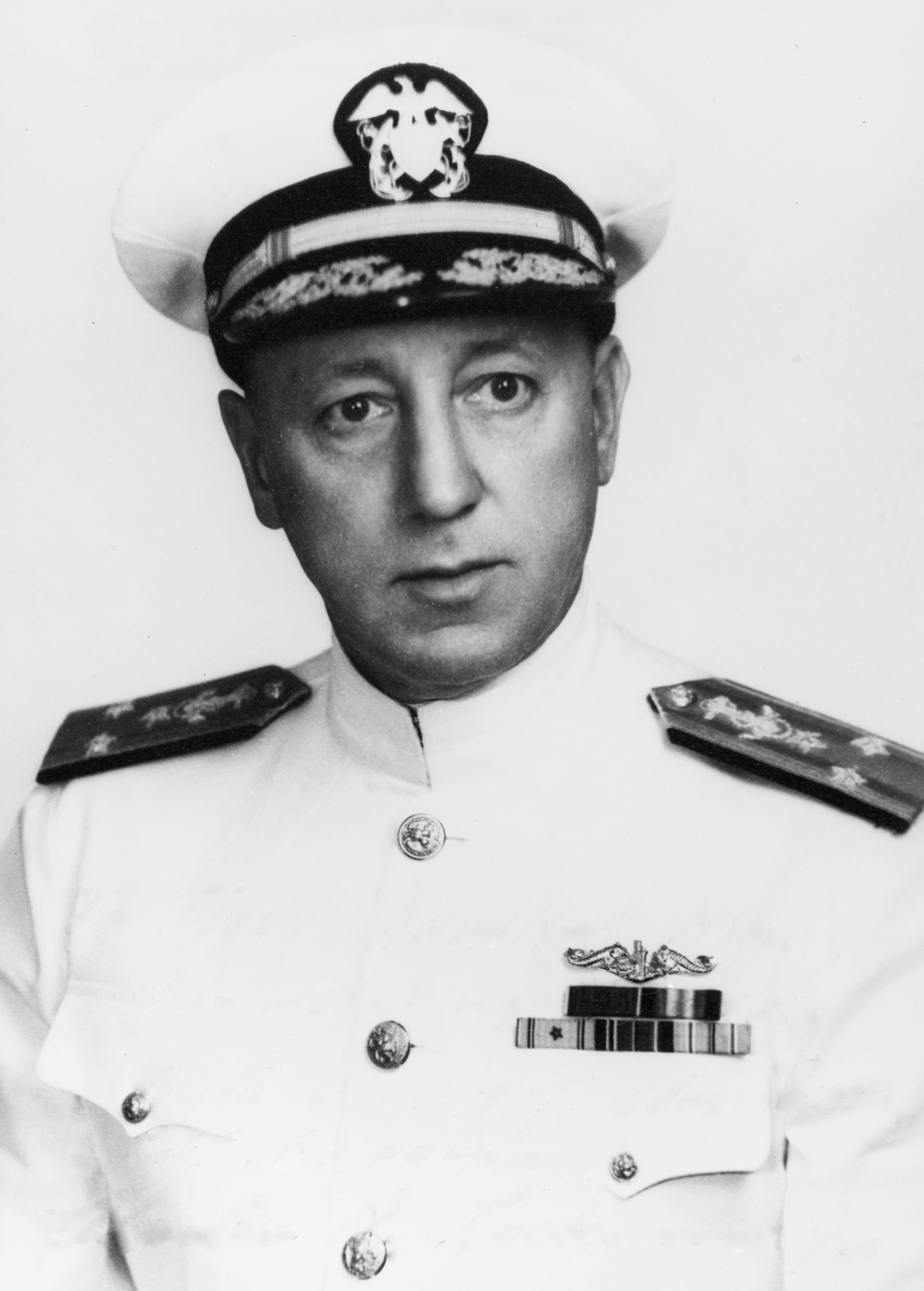
Vice Adm. Charles A. Lockwood

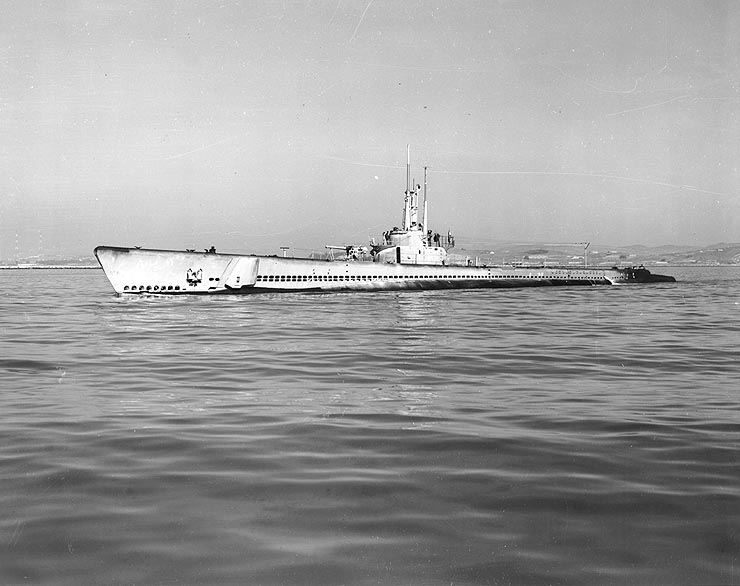
Balao-class submarine

Patrol Submarines
Vice Admiral Charles A. Lockwood (HQ at Pearl Harbor)

At the Bonins

2 Balao-class (10 tubes: 6 forward, 4 aft): Archerfish, Plaice
1 Gar-class (10 tubes: 6 forward, 4 aft): Gar
1 Sargo-class (8 tubes: 4 forward, 4 aft): Swordfish
1 Porpoise-class (6 tubes: 4 forward, 2 aft): Plunger

Southeast of Formosa and eastward

2 Balao-class (10 tubes: 6 forward, 4 aft): Pintado, Pilotfish
1 Gato-class (10 tubes: 6 forward, 4 aft): Tunny

East and Southeast of the Marianas

2 Gato-class (10 tubes: 6 forward, 4 aft): Albacore, Finback
1 Balao-class (10 tubes: 6 forward, 4 aft): Bang
1 Salmon-class (8 tubes: 4 forward, 4 aft): Stingray
1 Sargo-class (8 tubes: 4 forward, 4 aft): Seawolf

Ulithi and the Philippines

3 Gato-class (10 tubes: 6 forward, 4 aft): Flying Fish, Muskallunge, Cavalla
2 Balao-class (10 tubes: 6 forward, 4 aft): Seahorse, Pipefish

Off Surigao Strait

1 Gato-class (10 tubes: 6 forward, 4 aft): Growler

== Bibliography ==
- Morison, Samuel Eliot (1953), New Guinea and the Marianas, March 1944 – August 1944, History of United States Naval Operations in World War II, vol. VIII, Boston: Little, Brown and Co.
- Silverstone, Paul H. (1970). U.S. Warships of World War II. Garden City, NY: Doubleday and Co. ISBN 0-8702-1773-9.
- Stille, Mark (2016). US Navy Light Cruisers, 1941–45. Oxford: Osprey Publishing, Ltd. ISBN 978-1-4728-1140-0.
- Watts, A.J. (1966). Japanese Warships of World War II. Shepperton, Surrey: Ian Allan Ltd. ISBN 0-7110-0215-0.
