= Fast Carrier Task Force =

Primary striking force of the US Navy in the Pacific War

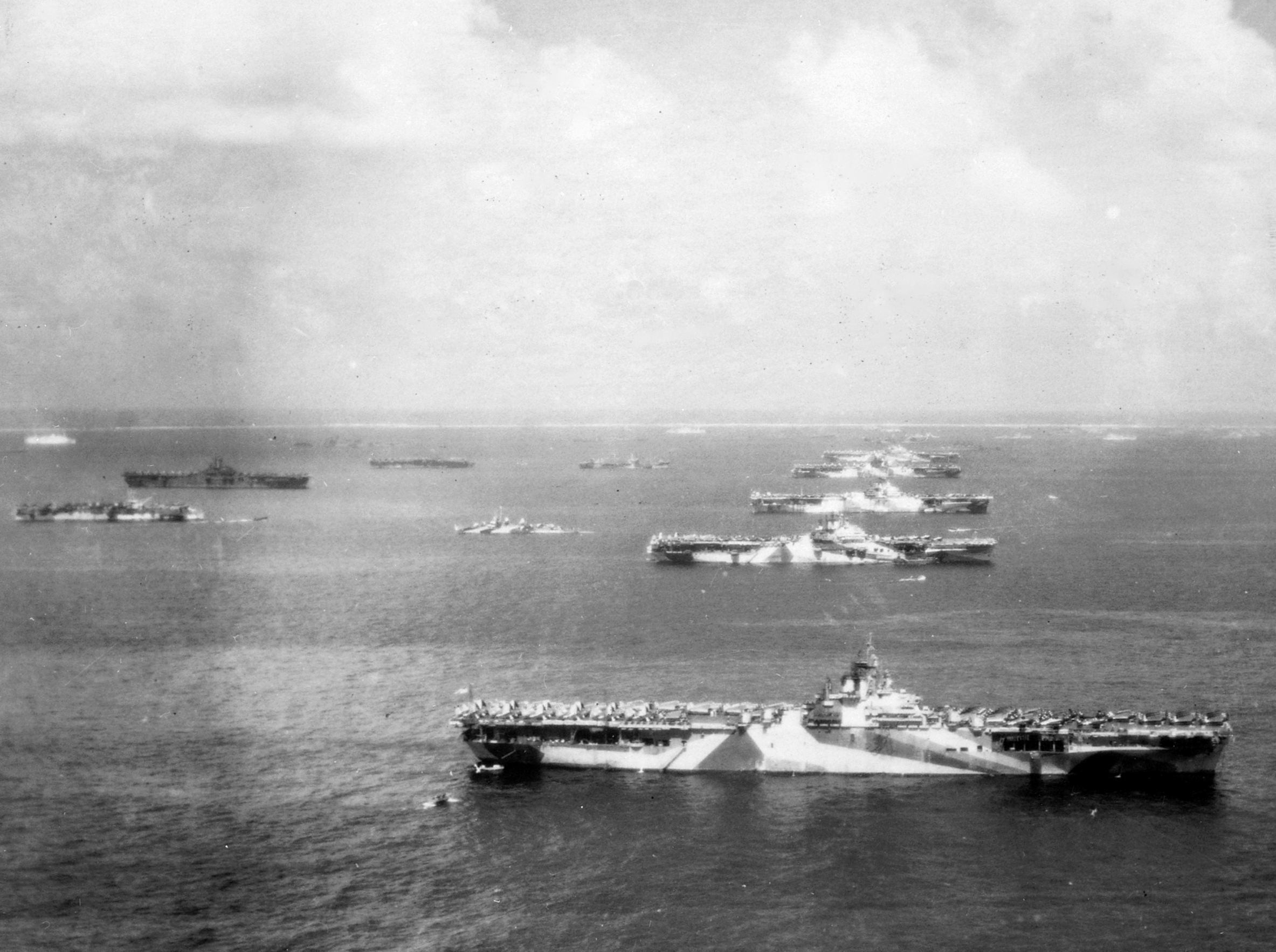
- Task Force 38 at Ulithi in December 1944
- Active: 1944–45
- Country: United States
- Branch: United States Navy
- Type: Fleet
- Size: 17 carriers, 6 battleships, 13 cruisers, 58 destroyers, 1,100 aircraft (December 1944); increased for Battle of Iwo Jima, 1945
- Part of: United States Pacific Fleet
- Garrison/HQ: Pearl Harbor
- Nickname: Task Force 38, Task Force 58
- Engagements: Pacific War

Commanders
- Notable commanders: Admiral Marc Mitscher; Admiral John S. McCain, Sr. Admiral John H. Towers

The Fast Carrier Task Force (TF 38 when assigned to Third Fleet, TF 58 when assigned to Fifth Fleet) was a group of ships in World War II. It was the main striking force of the United States Navy in the Pacific War from January 1944 through the end of the war in September 1945. The task force was made up of several separate task groups, each typically built around three to four aircraft carriers and their supporting vessels. The support vessels were screening destroyers, cruisers, and the newly built fast battleships.

== Carrier-based naval warfare ==
With the arrival of the fleet carriers the primary striking power of the navy was no longer in its battleship force, but with the aircraft that could be brought to battle by the carriers. The means by which the US Navy operated these carriers was developed principally by Admiral Marc Mitscher. Mitscher determined that the best defense for a carrier was its own air groups, and that carriers were more easily defended if they operated together in groups, with supporting ships along with them to aid in air defense, anti-submarine defense, and rescue of downed airmen.

Said Mitscher: "The ideal composition of a fast-carrier task force is four carriers, six to eight support vessels and not less than 18 destroyers, preferably 24. More than four carriers in a task group cannot be advantageously used due to the amount of air room required. Less than four carriers requires an uneconomical use of support ships and screening vessels."

The ships of each task group sailed in a circle formation centered on the carriers. The supporting ships sailed relatively close by, and added their anti-aircraft fire to that of the carriers to help ward off attacking aircraft. When under attack by torpedo aircraft, the task group would turn toward the oncoming aircraft to limit attack angles. Other than this measure, the carriers in the task group would not take evasive action from their attackers. This was in marked contrast with the Imperial Japanese Navy, but the choice made for more stable platforms for the anti-aircraft fire of all the ships in the task group and allowed the ships in the group to sail more closely together. The primary defense of the group against air attack was the group's own fighter cover.

== Admirals ==
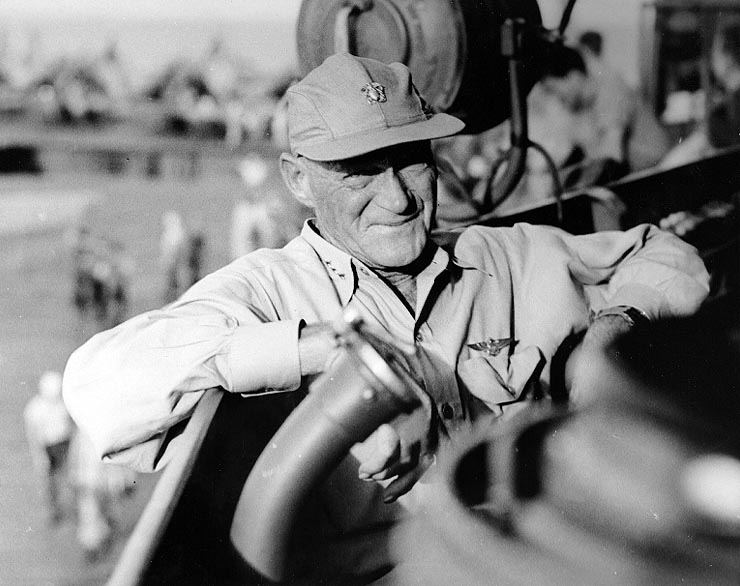
Admiral Marc Mitscher aboard the USS Lexington

The individual primarily responsible for the development and operations of the task force was Admiral Mitscher. (Note: At the end of the war, Admiral Nimitz said the following of Mitscher: "He is the most experienced and most able officer in the handling of fast carrier task forces who has yet been developed. It is doubtful if any officer has made more important contributions than he toward extinction of the enemy fleet.") The overall command of the task force alternated between two very different admirals: Raymond Spruance and William "Bull" Halsey. Spruance was calculating and cautious, while Halsey was more aggressive and known for taking risks. Most higher-ranking officers preferred to serve under Spruance; most common sailors were proud to serve under Halsey. Their commander was Admiral Chester Nimitz, who was responsible for all Pacific Ocean assets.

When the force was part of Admiral Spruance's Fifth Fleet, the carrier task force was commanded by Mitscher and bore the designation Task Force (TF) 58. When led by Admiral Halsey as part of the Third Fleet, the carrier force was commanded by Vice Admiral John S. McCain Sr. and its designation was Task Force (TF) 38. Planning for upcoming operations was completed when each admiral and his staff rotated out of active command. This allowed the Navy to perform at a higher operational tempo, while giving the Japanese the general impression of naval assets greater than what were actually available.

== World War II ==
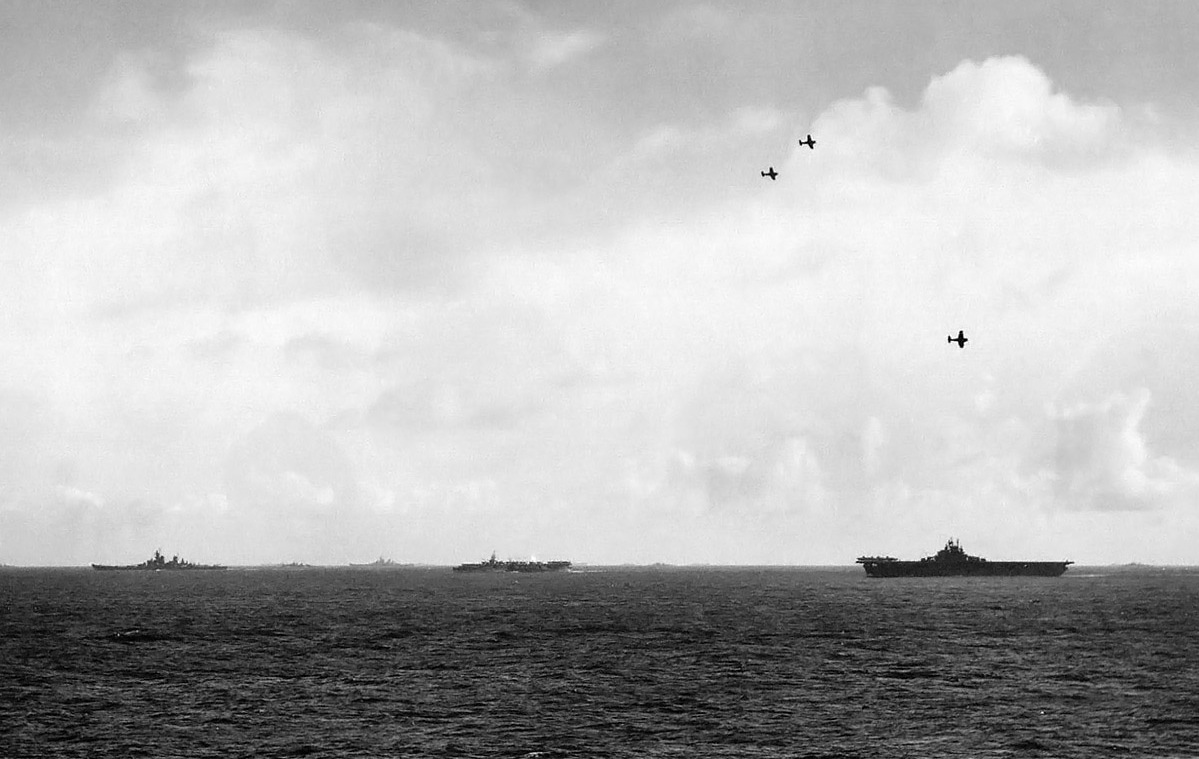
As Task Force 58, moving under the cover of a combat air patrol, 1944

The Fast Carrier Task Force took part in all the US Navy's battles in the Pacific during the last two years of the war. The task groups could operate independently or combine with the others as needs dictated. Raids against island strong points such as Iwo Jima or Chichi Jima might be undertaken by one or two task groups, but when a major operation was underway the task force would concentrate all four groups together. Each group would remain distinct but operate in close proximity to the other groups to provide the task force with maximum protection and maximum striking power.

The Fast Carrier Task Force worked in conjunction with the other two major components of the Pacific Fleet: the Amphibious Force, which was much larger overall and which carried and provided direct support to the Marine forces, and the Service Squadrons of hundreds of support vessels which resupplied and maintained the fleet. The fleet and task group designation changed when the command of the fleet changed hands. When under the umbrella of Fifth Fleet, the invasion force was called the Fifth Amphibious Force. When Halsey had command of the fleet, Third Amphibious Force was the designation. By the time of the Battle of Iwo Jima in early 1945, the Task Force included eighteen aircraft carriers, eight battleships and two Alaska-class large cruisers, along with numerous cruisers and destroyers. TF 58 alone commanded more firepower than any navy in history.

The original TF 38 came into existence in August 1943, built around USS Saratoga, and under the command of Rear Admiral Frederick C. Sherman. TF 58 was created on 6 January 1944 with Rear Admiral Marc Mitscher commanding, serving under the fleet command of Admiral Spruance in the Fifth Fleet. TF 38 continued to exist, but as a command structure only. TF 58 proved the success of the Fast Carrier TF concept with Operation Hailstone, a massive naval air squadrons and surface vessels attack on the Japanese ships and airfield at Truk Lagoon on 17–18 February 1944.

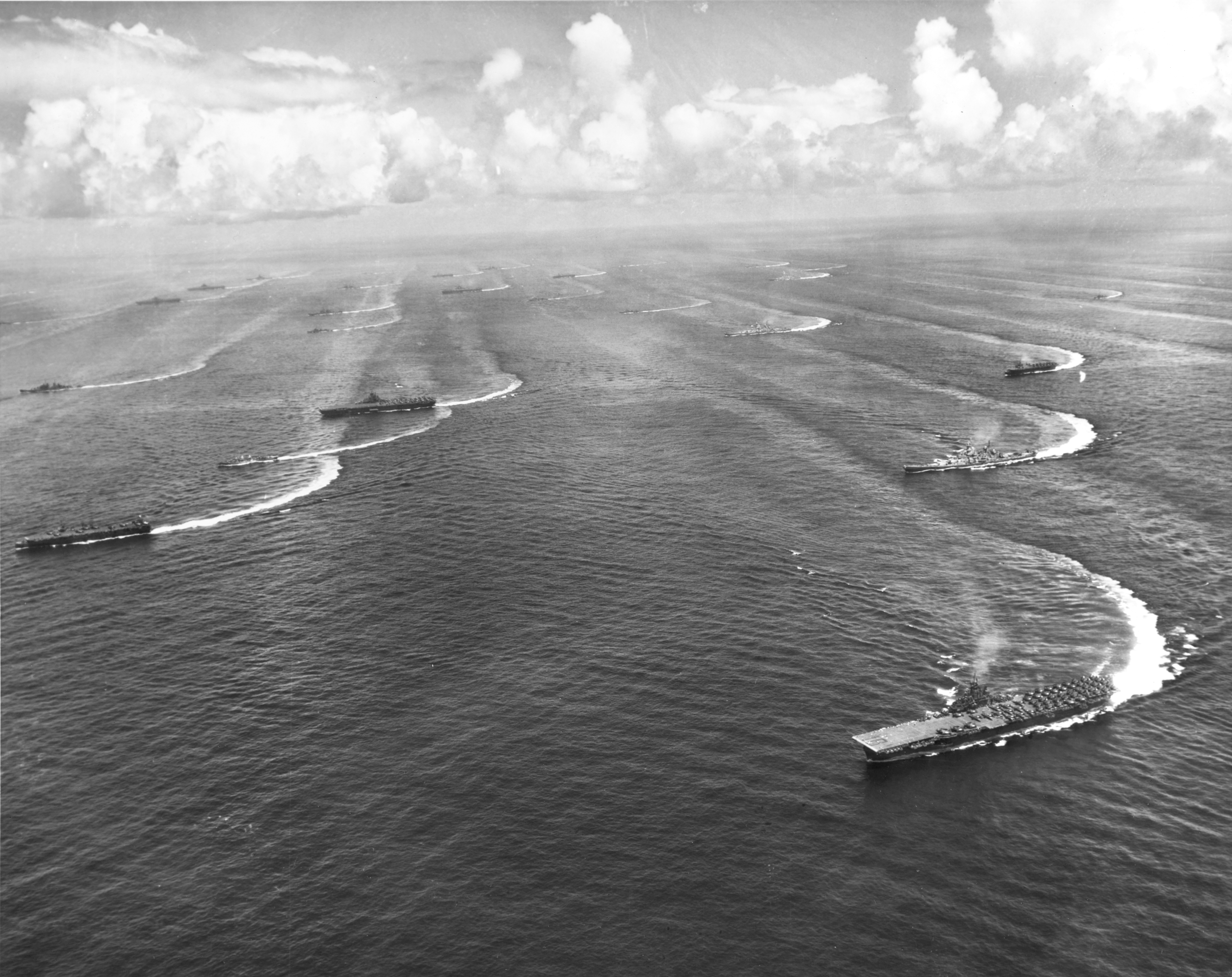
As Task Force 38, maneuvering off the Japanese coast, 17 August 1945

The only time that any aircraft carriers were used to support operations in New Guinea in the Southwest Pacific theater was during the double landings at Hollandia and Aitape in April 1944, hundreds of miles behind Japanese enemy lines and far beyond the range of short-ranged P-40 fighters of the Allied Air Forces. TF 58 and escort carriers in Task Force 78 supported the landings. TF 58 only stayed for four days but contributed much crucial air support to one of the greatest successes in the Pacific War.

With command change from Spruance to Halsey on 26 August 1944, all units changed designations again. Mitscher, who was an aviator from early training and had a masterful command of the airgroups, requested that he retain command of the Fast Carrier Task Force until his replacement, Admiral John McCain, could have proper time to become more familiar with the handling of a carrier task force. King and Nimitz concurred. Admiral Halsey, like Spruance before him, sailed with the Fast Carrier Task Force. The force grew to nine CVs and eight CVLs in preparation for the landings on Leyte. Task Force 38 was composed of four task groups: Task Group 38.1 was commanded by Admiral McCain, with its previous commander, Admiral Joseph "Jocko" Clark, remaining on as advisor, Task Group 38.2 was under the command of Admiral Gerald Bogan, Task Group 38.3 was led by Admiral Frederick Sherman, and Task Group 38.4 was under the command of Admiral Ralph Davison.

After the Battle of Leyte Gulf of October 1944, Mitscher went on shore leave and planning duty, and Vice Admiral McCain took over as commanding officer of TF 38, which continued under Halsey and the Third Fleet. In January 1945, TF 38 raided the South China Sea and attacked Japanese positions in Formosa and Luzon.

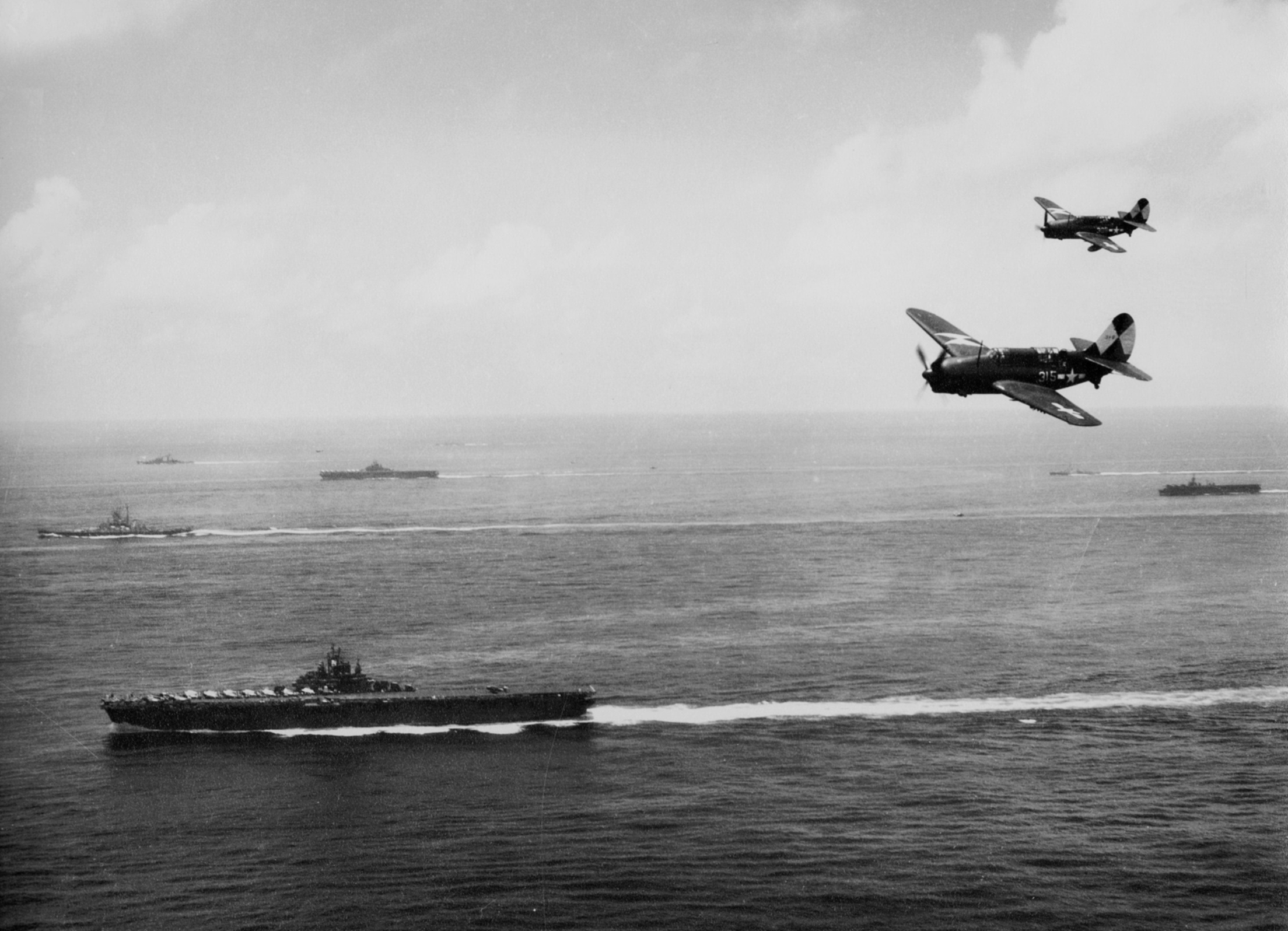
Ships of Task Group 38.3 operating off Okinawa during May 1945

On 26 January 1945, Halsey and McCain went on shore leave and planning duty, while Spruance and Mitscher returned to their previous commands. Third Fleet became Fifth Fleet, and TF 38 became TF 58. They led the fleet through the battles of Iwo Jima and Okinawa, facing sustained attacks from land-based Japanese kamikaze aircraft. As the Okinawa campaign dragged into its second month, the presence of the carriers was still required to provide close air support to the soldiers on the island as the Army and its Air Corps were not as adept as the Marine Corps at quickly establishing airfields over newly occupied territory. At the end of April, Admiral Nimitz came out to review the situation. After two months operating off the coast of Okinawa in support of Army forces engaged in battle on the island, the command staff was exhausted from the continuous pressure of fending off kamikaze attacks. On his return to Pearl Harbor, he notified Halsey that he would have to take over command from Spruance in thirty days, whether or not the mission was completed.

Nimitz' assessment of the exhaustion and psychological toll on Spruance and Mitscher and their staff due to the kamikazes proved to be justified. The kamikazes were so relentless at Okinawa that Spruance's flagships were struck two separate times (the heavy cruiser USS Indianapolis was hit on 31 March and had to retire for repairs which forced him to transfer to the battleship USS New Mexico which was also hit on 12 May). On 11 May, Mitscher and his chief of staff Commodore Arleigh Burke were merely yards away from getting killed or wounded by kamikazes on his flagship, USS Bunker Hill, which killed three of Mitscher's staff officers and eleven of his enlisted staff members and also destroyed his flag cabin along with all of his uniforms, personal papers, and possessions. Just three days later Mitscher's new flagship, USS Enterprise, was also struck by a kamikaze, forcing him to change his flagship yet again.

On 28 May 1945, Halsey arrived aboard USS Missouri, his new flagship, whereupon he relieved Spruance, while McCain relieved Mitscher. Spruance and Mitscher returned to Pearl Harbor. Fifth Fleet once again became Third Fleet, and Task Force 58 became Task Force 38. Halsey remained in command until the Japanese surrender ended the war on 2 September 1945.

== See also ==
- Battle of the Philippine Sea order of battle: Task Force 58 (June 1944)
- Battle of Leyte Gulf order of battle: Task Force 38 (October 1944)
- Typhoon Cobra, a powerful tropical cyclone that struck Task Force 38, causing heavy damage (December 1944)
- Battle of Okinawa order of battle: Task Force 58 (April 1945)
- Allied naval bombardments of Japan during World War II (July 1945)
- Combined Fleet
- British Pacific Fleet

== Bibliography ==
- Huggins, Mark (May–June 1999). "Setting Sun: Japanese Air Defence of the Philippines 1944–1945". Air Enthusiast (81): 28–35. ISSN 0143-5450.
- Potter, E.B. (2005). Admiral Arliegh Burke. U.S. Naval Institute Press. ISBN 978-1-59114-692-6.
- Reynonds, Clark (1968). The Fast Carriers. U.S. Naval Institute Press. ISBN 1-55750-701-5.
- Taylor, Theodore (1954). The Magnificent Mitscher. Naval Institute Press. ISBN 1-59114-850-2.
- Willmott, H.P. (1984). June, 1944. Blandford Press. ISBN 0-7137-1446-8.
