= USS Plunger =

USS Plunger has been the name of more than one United States Navy ship, and may refer to:

- USS Plunger (1897), a submarine launched in 1897, never commissioned, and cancelled in 1900
- USS Plunger (SS-2), renamed USS A-1 in 1911, a submarine in commission from 1903 to 1905 and from 1907 to 1913
- USS Plunger (SS-179), a submarine in commission from 1936 to 1945
- USS Plunger (SSN-595), a submarine in commission from 1962 to 1990
