= USS Pintado =

Two vessels of the United States Navy have borne the name USS Pintado, named in honor of the pintado.

- USS Pintado (SS-387) was a Balao-class submarine commissioned in 1944 and struck in 1967.
- USS Pintado (SSN-672) was a Sturgeon-class submarine commissioned in 1971 and struck in 1998.
