= USS Tunny =

Two submarines of the United States Navy have been named USS Tunny, for the tunny, any of several oceanic fishes resembling the mackerel.

- USS Tunny (SS-282), a Gato-class submarine, served in World War II, as a Regulus missile boat, and during the Vietnam War.
- USS Tunny (SSN-682), a Sturgeon-class submarine, served during the last years of the Cold War.
