= Gralla (surname) =

Gralla is the Germanized form of the Polish surname Grala. Notable people with the surname include:

- Arthur R. Gralla (1913–1998), American sailor
- Dina Gralla (1905–1994), German actress
