= USS Batfish (SSN-681) =

Submarine of the United States

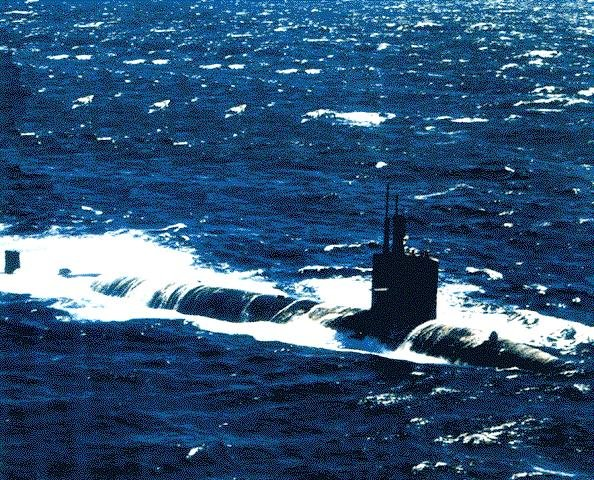
- USS Batfish (SSN-681) at the end of March 1995 in the western Atlantic Ocean on her way to a six-month Mediterranean Sea deployment as part of the USS Theodore Roosevelt (CVN-71) carrier battle group.

History

United States
- Name: Batfish
- Namesake: The batfish, the name of any of several fishes
- Ordered: 25 June 1968
- Builder: General Dynamics Electric Boat
- Laid down: 9 February 1970
- Launched: 9 October 1971
- Sponsored by: Mrs. Arthur R. Gralla
- Commissioned: 1 September 1972
- Decommissioned: 17 March 1999
- Stricken: 17 March 1999
- Fate: Scrapping via Ship and Submarine Recycling Program completed 22 November 2002
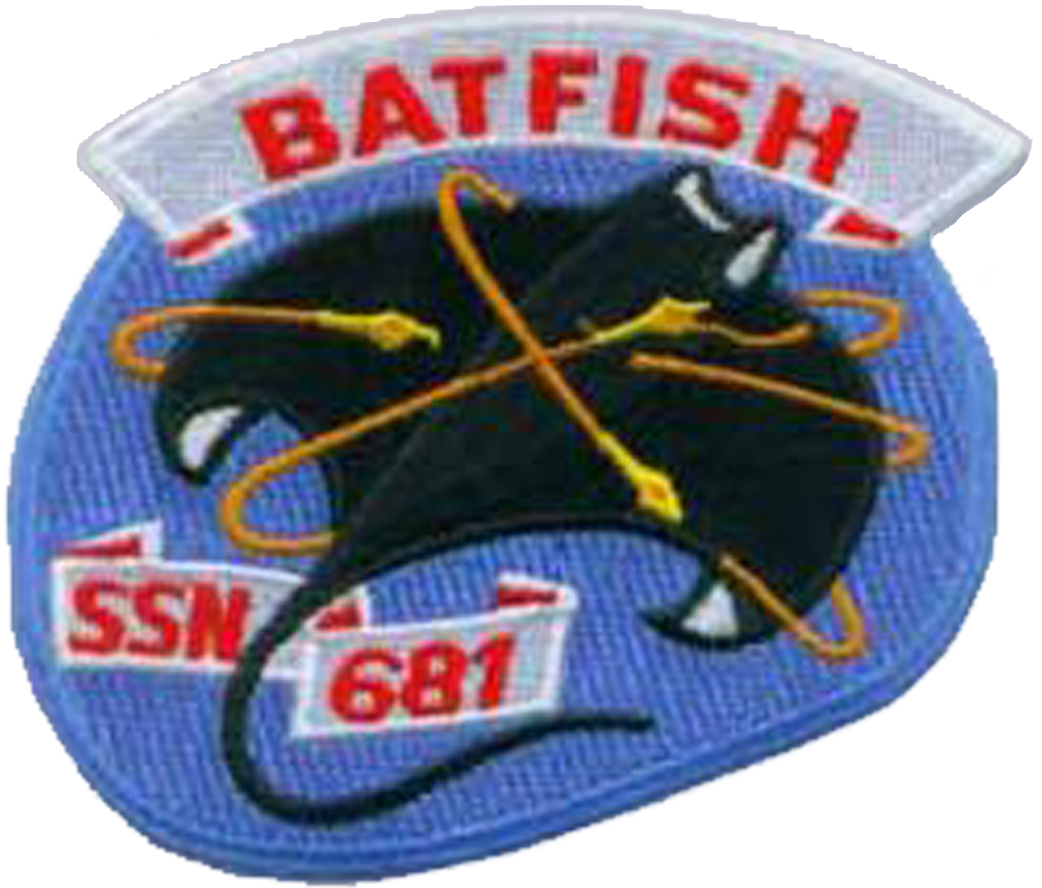
- Badge

General characteristics
- Class & type: Sturgeon-class submarine
- Displacement: 3,640 long tons (3,698 t) surfaced; 4,650 long tons (4,725 t) submerged
- Length: 302 ft 2 in (92.10 m)
- Beam: 31 ft 8 in (9.65 m)
- Draft: 28 ft 6 in (8.69 m)
- Installed power: 15,000 shaft horsepower (11.2 megawatts)
- Propulsion: One S5W nuclear reactor with S3G3 modified core, two steam turbines, one screw
- Speed: 20 knots (37 km/h; 23 mph) surfaced; 30 knots (56 km/h; 35 mph) submerged
- Test depth: 1,300 feet (400 meters)
- Complement: 112 (14 officers, 98 enlisted men)
- Armament: 4 × 21-inch (533 mm) torpedo tubes

USS Batfish (SSN-681), was a nuclear-powered attack submarine of the United States Navy. She was the eleventh Sturgeon-class submarine launched. Her primary missions were anti-submarine warfare, intelligence gathering, and screening carrier battle groups. She was launched in 1971 and decommissioned in 1999.

== Construction and characteristics ==
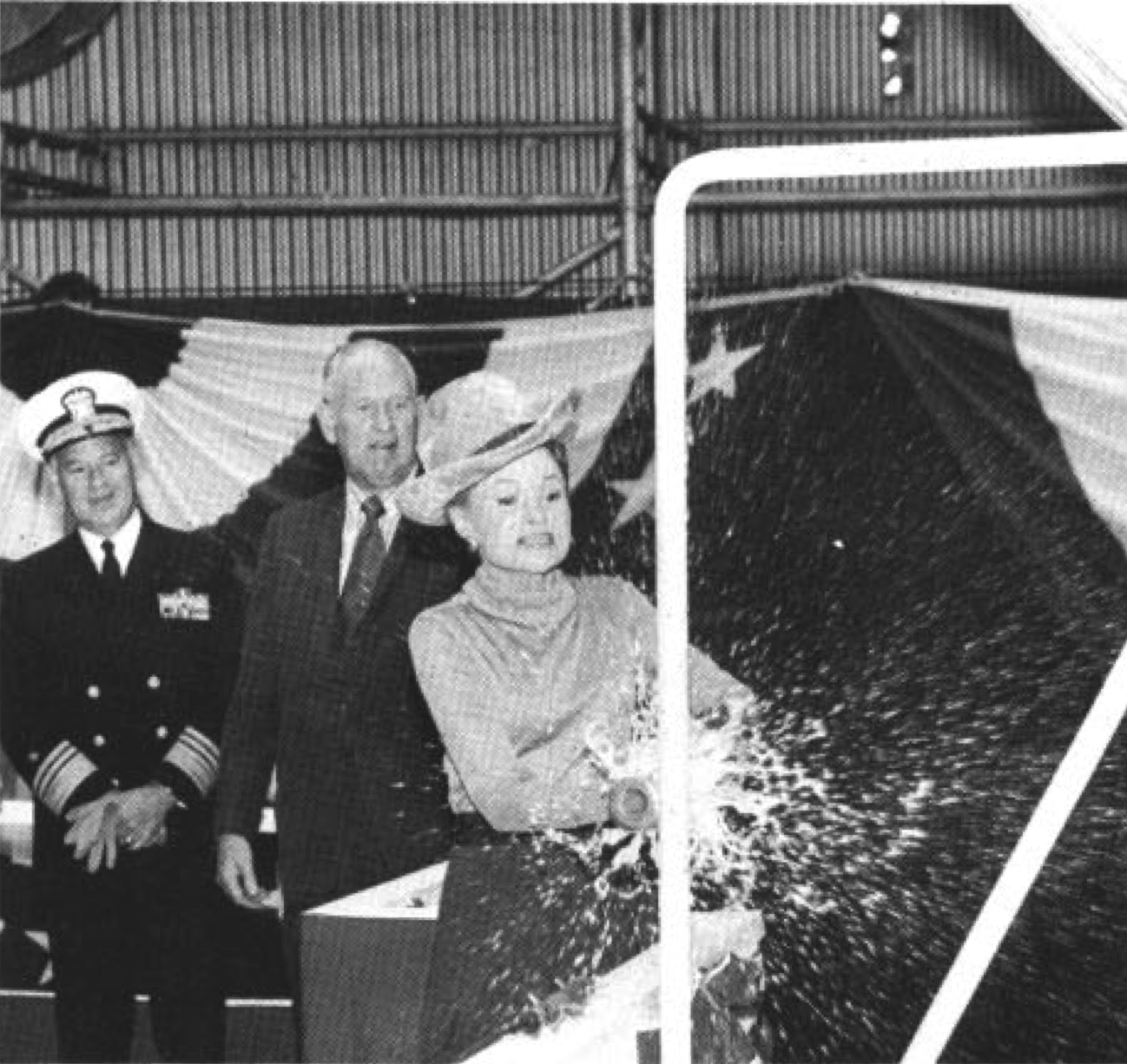
Mrs. Gralla christens Batfish at her launch ceremony.

The contract to build Batfish was awarded to the Electric Boat Division of General Dynamics Corporation on 25 June 1968. Her keel was laid down in its Groton, Connecticut shipyard on 9 February 1970. The boat was launched on 9 October 1971, sponsored by Mrs. Mildred C. Gralla, wife of Vice Admiral Arthur R. Gralla, commander of the Military Sealift Command. The featured speaker at the ceremony was Senator Lowell P. Weicker. The submarine completed her initial sea trials successfully in June 1972 under the supervision of Admiral Hyman G. Rickover. She was commissioned at a ceremony in Groton on 1 September 1972 where Rear Admiral Walter L. Small was the featured speaker.

Batfish was originally budgeted at $67 million in the Navy's fiscal year 1967 budget. By 1970 he estimated cost had risen to $76.5 million, both because her various subcontractors had learned just how complex these submarines were, and because of design modifications required by the Navy.

The ship was 302 feet 2 inches (92.10 m) long; she was a long-hull variant of the Sturgeon class which provided an extra 10 feet (3.0 m) of hull space over the earlier vessels in her class. Batfish had a beam of 31 feet 8 inches (9.65 m), and a draft of 29 feet 6 inches (8.99 m) when surfaced. She displaced 3,640 long tons when surfaced and 4,650 long tons when submerged.

Her hull and sail were made from welded steel plates. Her bow was reserved for her spherical sonar array, and thus her torpedo tubes were mounted amidships.

She had a single propeller that was driven by two steam turbines. Steam for the turbines was produced by a Westinghouse S5W nuclear reactor. Her maximum speed was approximately 20 knots surfaced and 30 knots submerged.

Her main armament was four 21-inch torpedo tubes which accommodated Mark 48 torpedoes, SUBROC and Harpoon missiles, and various mines.

Batfish had BQQ-5 sonar system which included a bow-mounted spherical-array. It also had a retractable 1,100-foot towed array, likely a TB-16. She had two periscopes for visual search, one smaller than the other to minimize the possibility of detection.

The submarine was an early user of a number of advanced technologies. In 1976, Batfish was the first submarine to make operational use of Extremely-Low-Frequency radio communications. In 1980, she was the first U.S. submarine to receive Special Hull Treatment, a coating of rubberized anechoic tiles which were glued to her hull to dampen noise emissions. An electrostatically supported gyro navigator (ESGN) inertial navigation system allowed Batfish to determine her location even when navigating submerged for extended periods.

She was manned by 12 officers and 95 enlisted men at the time of her launch, but her complement varied over time and was as large as 12 officers and 110 men.

Batfish was the second ship of the United States Navy to be named for the batfish. The first Batfish was a successful World War II submarine.

== Service history ==
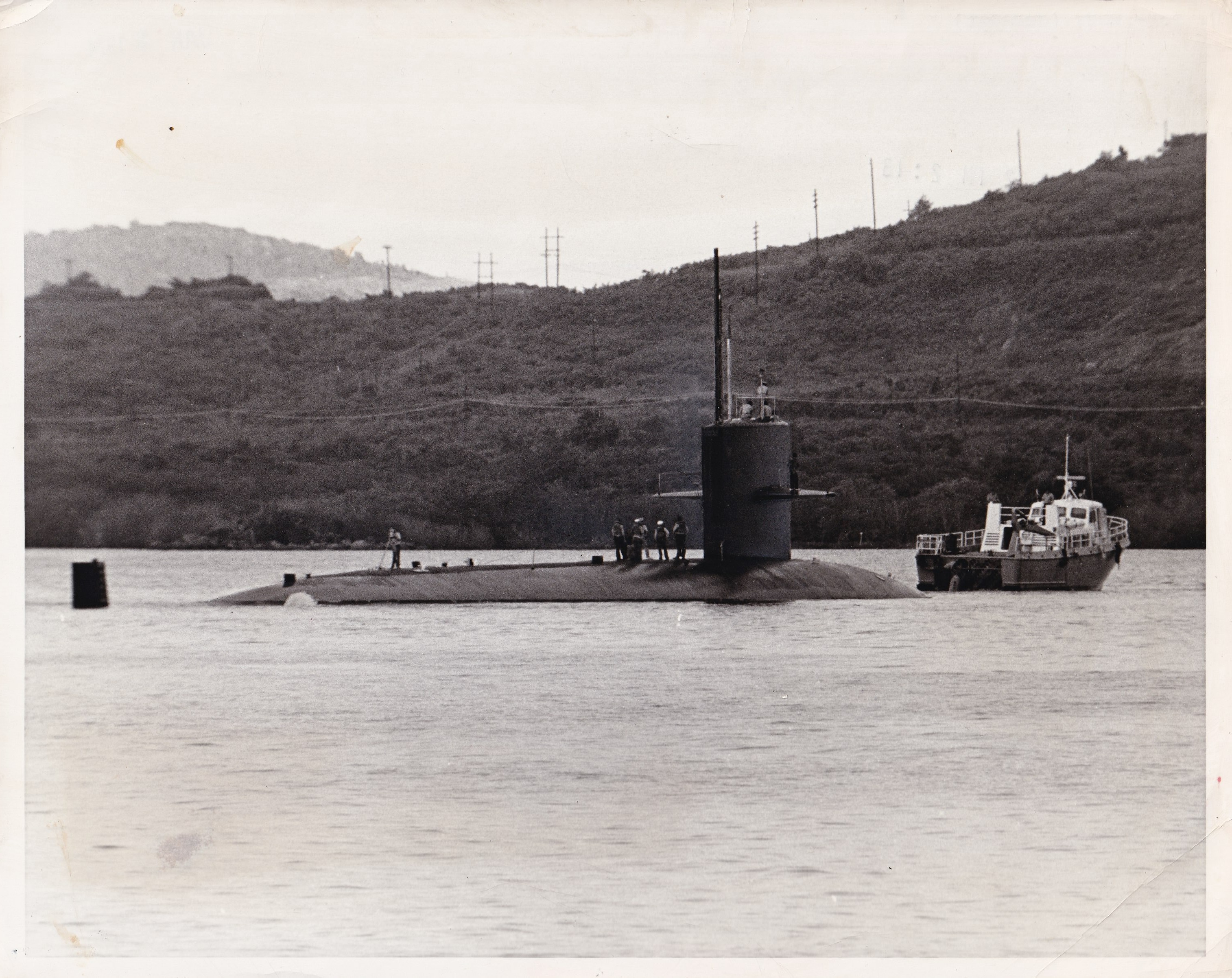
Batfish at Naval Station Roosevelt Roads testing her torpedo tubes in 1972

After commissioning, Batfish was assigned to Submarine Squadron 4, which at the time was based at Naval Station Charleston at Charleston, South Carolina. She arrived there on 7 October 1972 after stops at Norfolk and the U.S. Naval Academy.

Through the late spring of 1974, Batfish went through training, evaluation, maintenance, and modification to ready her for deployment. About 1 p.m. on 22 January 1973, Batfish ran hard aground at the entrance to Charleston Harbor while proceeding to sea. She was pulled free by five tugs at about 7 p.m. that same day. Fog was reported as a possible cause of the grounding. She returned to port where her bottom was repaired.

The boat was sent on her first operational deployment in 1974. Much of Batfish's service history was classified, but it clearly involved shadowing Soviet ballistic missile submarines, and intelligence gathering near the Soviet's Arctic coast. Contemporary reporting on her activities was sparse. The following activities are documented:

Start	End	Mission	Ports of Call
Late spring 1974	End of June 1974	ASW in Eastern Atlantic	Portland, England
July 1974		Fleet exercise off Jacksonville, FL	
August 1974	October 1974	NATO exercise "Northern Merger"	
23 July 1975		Special Operations in the Atlantic	
26 August 1975		ASW operations with 6th Fleet	Taranto, Italy
September 1975		NATO exercise "Deep Express"	La Maddalena, Italy
November 1975		NATO exercise "Devil Foil"	La Spezia, Italy
November 1975		NATO exercise "Dogfish"	La Maddalena, Italy
December 1975	January 1976	Special Operations	Naples, Italy
October 1976		NATO exercise "Teamwork '76"	
2 March 1978	17 May 1978	Operation Evening Star (see below)	
14 November 1978	9 December 1978	Fleet exercise "Gulfex '79"	Tampa, Cape Canaveral, Florida
October 1979		Fleet exercise "Linear Chair"	
July 1986		Fleet exercise "Advance Phase III"	
February 1992	August 1992	Operation Maritime Monitor in Mediterranean	
22 March 1995	July 1995	Theodore Roosevelt Carrier Battle Group in support of operations in the Balkans	

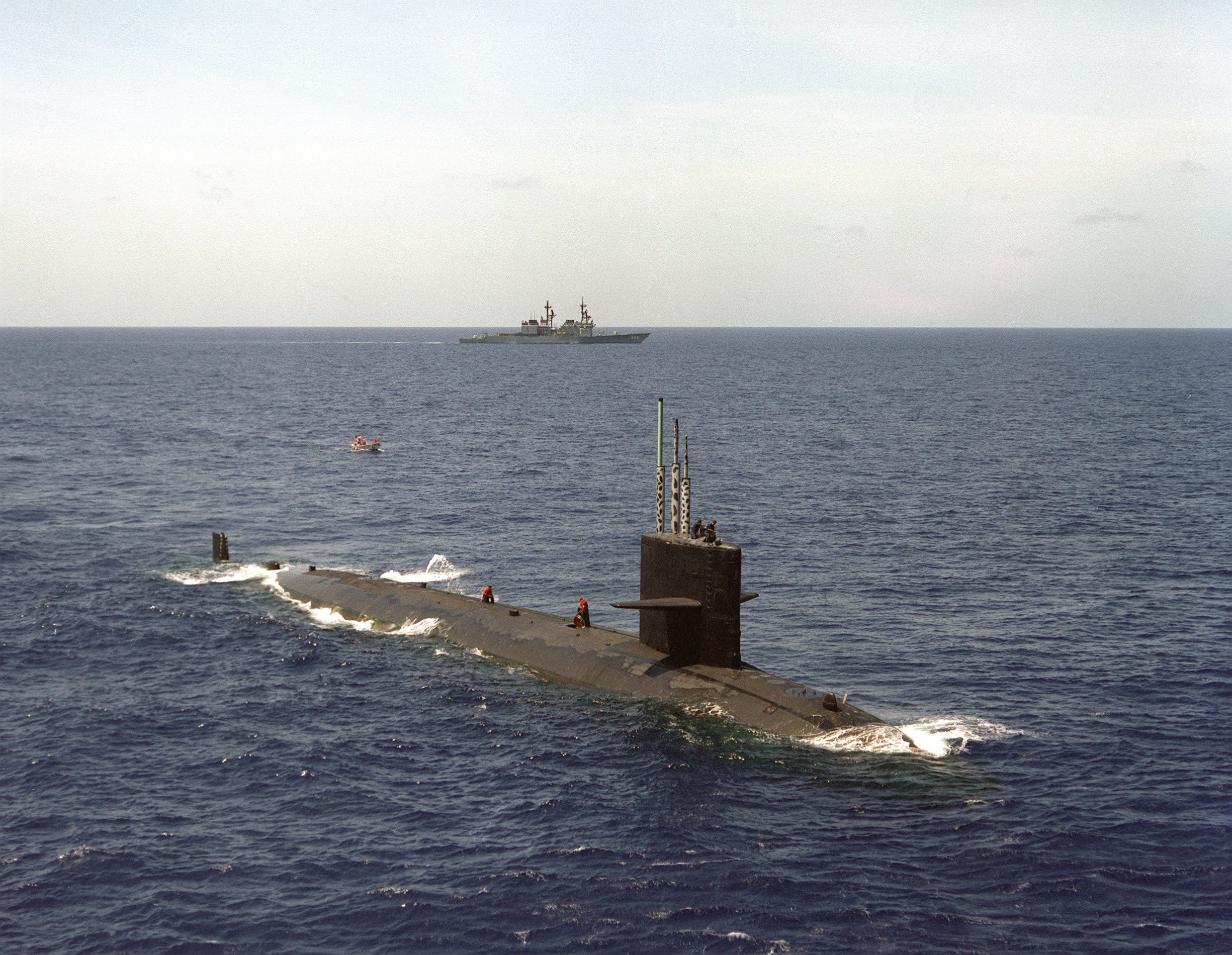
Batfish during Advance Phase III in 1986

The 1993 Base Realignment and Closure Commission recommended the consolidation of Atlantic Fleet nuclear submarines into one base. Consequently, Batfish's homeport was changed in September 1994 to Groton and Naval Submarine Base New London. This remained her home port for the rest of her operational life.

=== Operation Evening Star, 1978 ===
On 2 March 1978, Batfish left Charleston captained by Commander (later Rear Admiral) Thomas Evans. Like most of the boat's deployments, details of "Operation Evening Star" were classified. Some of the details of this remarkable patrol were declassified in June 1999, and a press conference highlighting the mission was held on 1 March 2001 as part of a program to honor the centennial of the U.S. submarine force.

Batfish was dispatched from Charleston because U.S. spy satellites and CIA-sponsored Norwegian intelligence activities suggested that a Soviet Navy Yankee I-class ballistic missile submarine was about to leave her base on the Kola Peninsula. On 17 March 1978, Batfish detected this submarine in the Norwegian Sea some 200 nautical miles (370 km) above the Arctic Circle. Batfish began trailing the boat, collecting valuable information on how Soviet submarines operated. On 19 March, after 350 miles and 51 hours of trailing her target, Batfish lost contact during a storm. A P-3 Orion patrol plane sent from Reykjavik refound the Soviet sub, and Batfish was able to once again slip in behind her on 21 March. Batfish remained in contact with the missile submarine for the next 44 days over 8,870 nautical miles, only breaking off in the Norwegian Sea as the Soviet ship returned to base.

On 17 May 1978, after 77 days submerged, Batfish surfaced off Charleston to return to her home port. Commander Evans was awarded the Legion of Merit for this mission.

The Soviets remained unaware that their submarines were being followed until U.S. Navy Chief Warrant Officer John Anthony Walker reported the incident to them while he was spying in the 1980s. Walker pleaded guilty to espionage in 1985. Ironically, the leak of Batfish's success in tracking the Soviet missile submarine may have contributed to the end of the Cold War. The realization that its submarine-launched missiles were vulnerable, and were not a reliable second-strike force is thought by some to have influenced Soviet unwillingness to compete with the United States. In 1985, Secretary of the Navy John Lehman declared that U.S. submarines would attack Soviet missile submarines "in the first five minutes of the war", a statement given credibility by Batfish's success in Operation Evening Star.

=== Major maintenance ===
The boat underwent continual maintenance to keep her running, and she had short periods of upkeep and restricted availability throughout her service life. During her 27 years of commissioned service, she spent over three years undergoing two major overhauls.

Batfish underwent a 15-month overhaul at Portsmouth, Virginia beginning in March 1979. This work was estimated at $36.7 million.

The submarine began an extensive overhaul in January 1988 at the Charleston Naval Shipyard. She did not leave the yard for sea trials until December 5, 1990. Vice Admiral Roger F. Bacon, Commander of the Submarine Force, U.S. Atlantic Fleet, publicly criticized the shipyard's work as 14 months late and $6 million over budget. The overhaul cost $127.5 million.

== Final disposition ==
Batfish changed to "in commission, in reserve" status, pending scrapping, on 2 November 1998. She was decommissioned on 17 March 1999 at the Pearl Harbor Submarine Base and stricken from the Naval Vessel Register the same day. Her scrapping via the Nuclear-Powered Ship and Submarine Recycling Program at Puget Sound Naval Shipyard in Bremerton, Washington, was completed on 22 November 2002.

== Awards ==
Batfish and her crew earned a variety of honors and awards during her service including:

- Navy Unit Commendation in 1977, 1978, 1982, 1995, and 1998
- Meritorious Unit Commendation in 1975 and 1996
- Navy "E" Ribbon in 1976 and 1991
- National Defense Service Medal (second)
- Armed Forces Expeditionary Medal in May–June 1998
- Armed Forces Service Medal in 1992 and 1995
- Sea Service Deployment Ribbon (multiple)
