= USS Reno (CL-96) =

Atlanta-class light cruiser

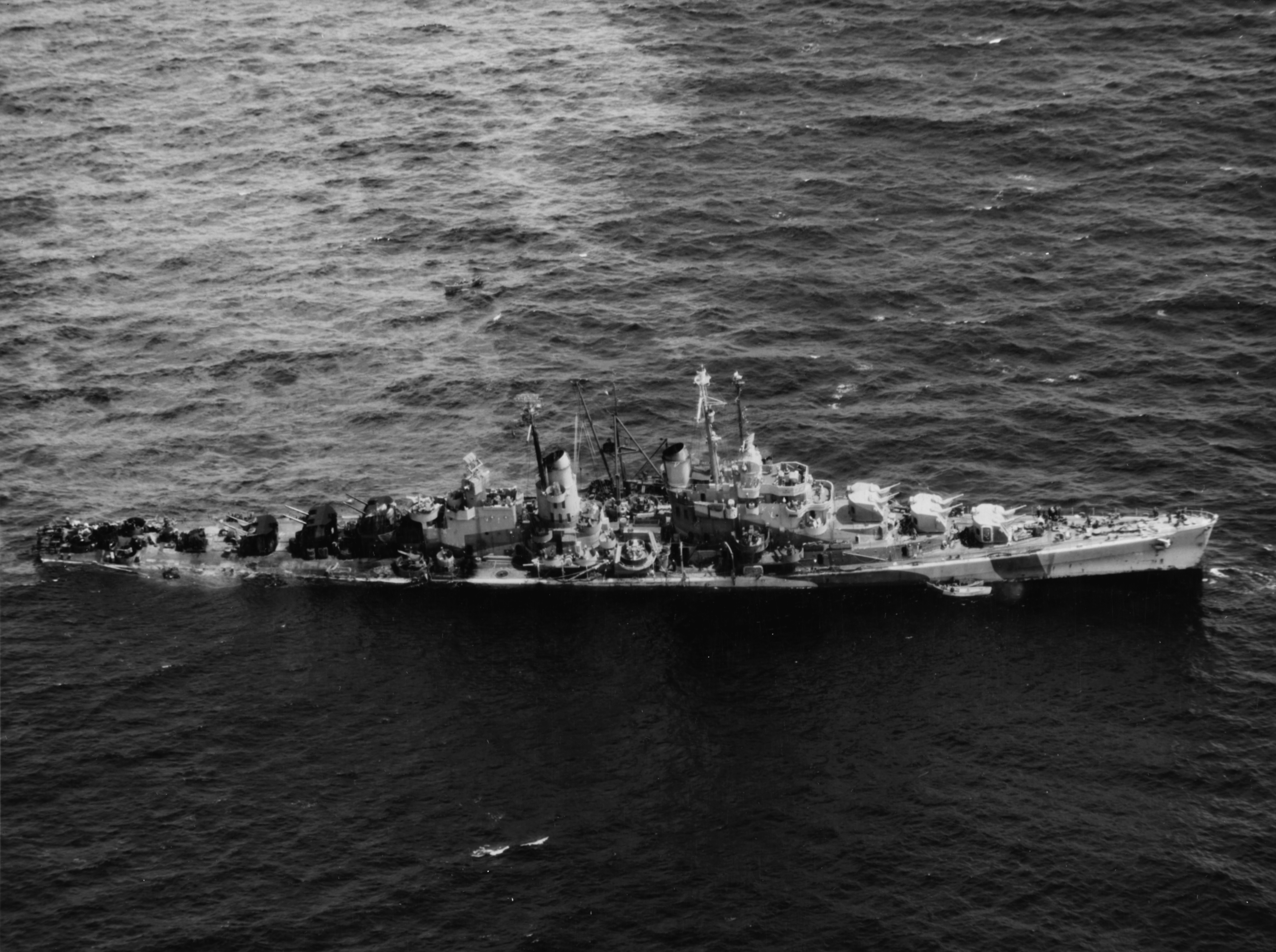
- USS Reno, November 1944, down by the stern two days after being torpedoed

History

United States
- Name: Reno
- Namesake: City of Reno, Nevada
- Builder: Bethlehem Shipbuilding Corporation, San Francisco, California
- Laid down: 1 August 1941
- Launched: 23 December 1942
- Sponsored by: Mrs. August C. Frohlich
- Commissioned: 28 December 1943
- Decommissioned: 4 November 1946
- Reclassified: CLAA-96 18 March 1949
- Stricken: 1 March 1959
- Identification: Hull symbol:CL-96; Hull symbol:CLAA-96; Code letters:NBPO
- Honors and awards: 3 × battle stars
- Fate: Scrapped in 1962

General characteristics (as built)
- Class & type: Atlanta-class light cruiser
- Displacement: 6,718 long tons (6,826 t) (standard); 8,340 long tons (8,470 t) (max)
- Length: 541 ft 6 in (165.05 m) oa
- Beam: 53 ft (16 m)
- Draft: 20 ft 6 in (6.25 m) (mean); 26 ft 6 in (8.08 m) (max)
- Installed power: 4 × Steam boilers; 75,000 shp (56,000 kW)
- Propulsion: 2 × geared turbines; 2 × screws
- Speed: 32.5 kn (37.4 mph; 60.2 km/h)
- Complement: 688 officers and enlisted
- Armament: 12 × 5 in (127 mm)/38 caliber Mark 12 guns (6×2); 8 × dual 40 mm (1.6 in) Bofors anti-aircraft guns; 16 × 20 mm Oerlikon anti-aircraft cannons; 8 × 21 in (533 mm) torpedo tubes; 6 × depth charge projectors; 2 × depth charge tracks
- Armor: Belt: 1.1–3 3/4 in (28–95 mm); Deck: 1 1/4 in (32 mm); Turrets: 1 1/4 in (32 mm); Conning Tower: 2 1/2 in (64 mm)

USS Reno (CL-96) was an updated Atlanta-class light cruiser - sometimes referred to as an "Oakland-class" - designed and built to specialize in antiaircraft warfare. She was the first warship to be named for the city of Reno, Nevada. Reno (DD-303) was a destroyer named for Lt. Commander Walter E. Reno.

Reno was laid down by Bethlehem Shipbuilding Corporation, at San Francisco, California, on 1 August 1941. She was launched on 23 December 1942; sponsored by Mrs. August C. Frohlich; and commissioned on 28 December 1943. The USS Reno saw combat in the Pacific theater from April 1944 until it was torpedoed and damaged in November that year. The light cruiser was repaired and performed several transport voyages to Europe before being decommissioned in November 1946.

== Service history ==
=== Shakedown ===
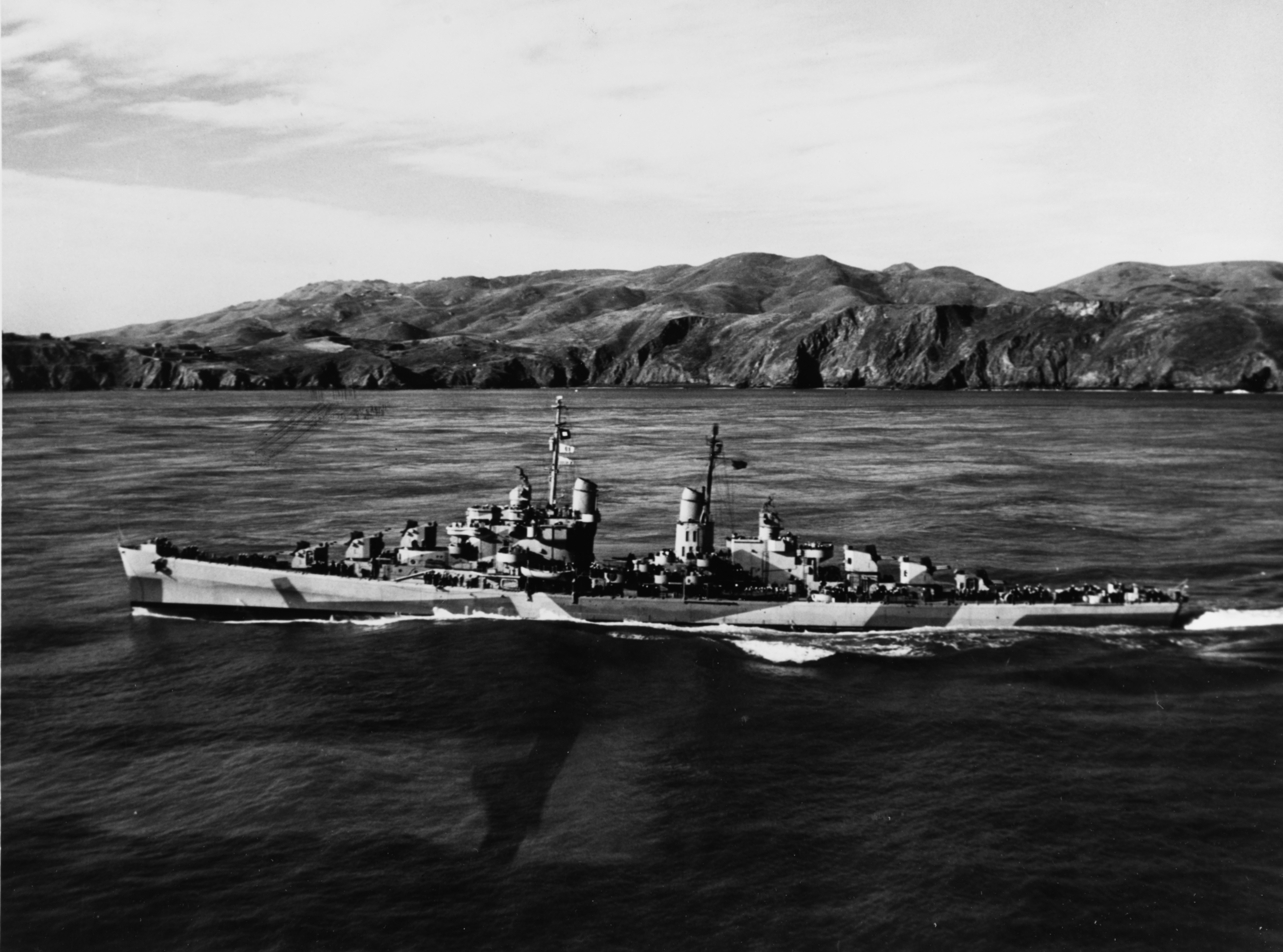
Reno underway off California in January 1944

Following a shakedown cruise off the coast of San Diego, the USS Reno departed from San Francisco on 14 April 1944, steaming west to join the 5th Fleet, under the command of Admiral Raymond A. Spruance. As an active unit in Vice Admiral Marc Mitscher's Fast Carrier Task Force (Task Force 58), Reno first came in contact with the enemy while supporting minor air raids against Marcus Island on 19–20 May. Three days later, she also supported air strikes on Japanese-held Wake Island.

=== Battle of the Philippine Sea ===
During the months of June to July 1944, Reno joined the fast aircraft carriers in air attacks against Saipan on 11 June, Pagan Island on 12–13 June, and against the Volcano Islands and the Bonin Islands - namely Iwo Jima, Haha Jima, and Chichi Jima on 15–16 June. Three days later, Reno aided in repelling a large-scale Japanese Navy aircraft carrier task force attempt to defeat the American invasion of the Marianas Islands (including Guam, Saipan, and Tinian, during the Battle of the Philippine Sea - the world's largest carrier vs. carrier battle of all time, and an overwhelming victory by the U.S. Navy.

=== Guam ===
From 20 June to 8 July 1944, Reno joined operations covering the conquest of Saipan. She then covered amphibious landings on Guam from 17 to 24 July, and two days later, she took part in air strikes against the Palau Islands from 26 to 29 July. The 5th Fleet then became the 3rd Fleet, as Admiral William F. Halsey, Jr., rotated in to command this fleet. Doubling back northward again, one more series of air strikes were made on the Bonin Islands on 4–5 August. Then on 7 September, TF 38 (formerly TF 58) returned south to hit the Palaus again.

=== Philippines ===
After steaming west across the Philippine Sea, Reno and TF 38 carried out some of the first American air raids against the Philippines hitting the southern island of Mindanao, and its adjacent islands, from 9–13 September 1944. TF 58 supported the amphibious landings on two of the Palau's from 15 to 20 September, and then on 21–22 September, it carried out air strikes against the Manila area of Luzon in the northern Philippines. While striking the island of Nansei Shoto on 8 October, Reno and TF 38 came closer to the Japanese Home Islands than any other major units of the U.S. Navy had been during World War II.

During a 3-day series of air strikes by TF 38 on Japanese airfields on the previously-touched island of Formosa from 12 to 14 October 1944, Reno shot down at least six enemy aircraft. At the height of this aerial battle, one Imperial Japanese Navy torpedo plane crashed on Reno's fantail, exploding and partially incapacitating turret #6, but the turret officer in charge succeeded in maintaining his defensive fire against the attacking Japanese planes.

==== USS Princeton ====
On 24 October 1944, four days after the amphibious invasion of Leyte, while supporting air strikes against Japanese airfields on Luzon, TF 38 was subjected to a large-scale air attack by land-based aircraft from Clark Field, Luzon. The light aircraft carrier Princeton took the brunt of the attack; she was hit by an aerial bomb and forced to withdraw from the Task Force. Reno was assigned to help fight fires on board Princeton by bringing her fire hoses to bear, and also to rescue her crewmen. Reno closed Princeton five times but could not remain on station because of intense heat and smoke from the burning carrier.

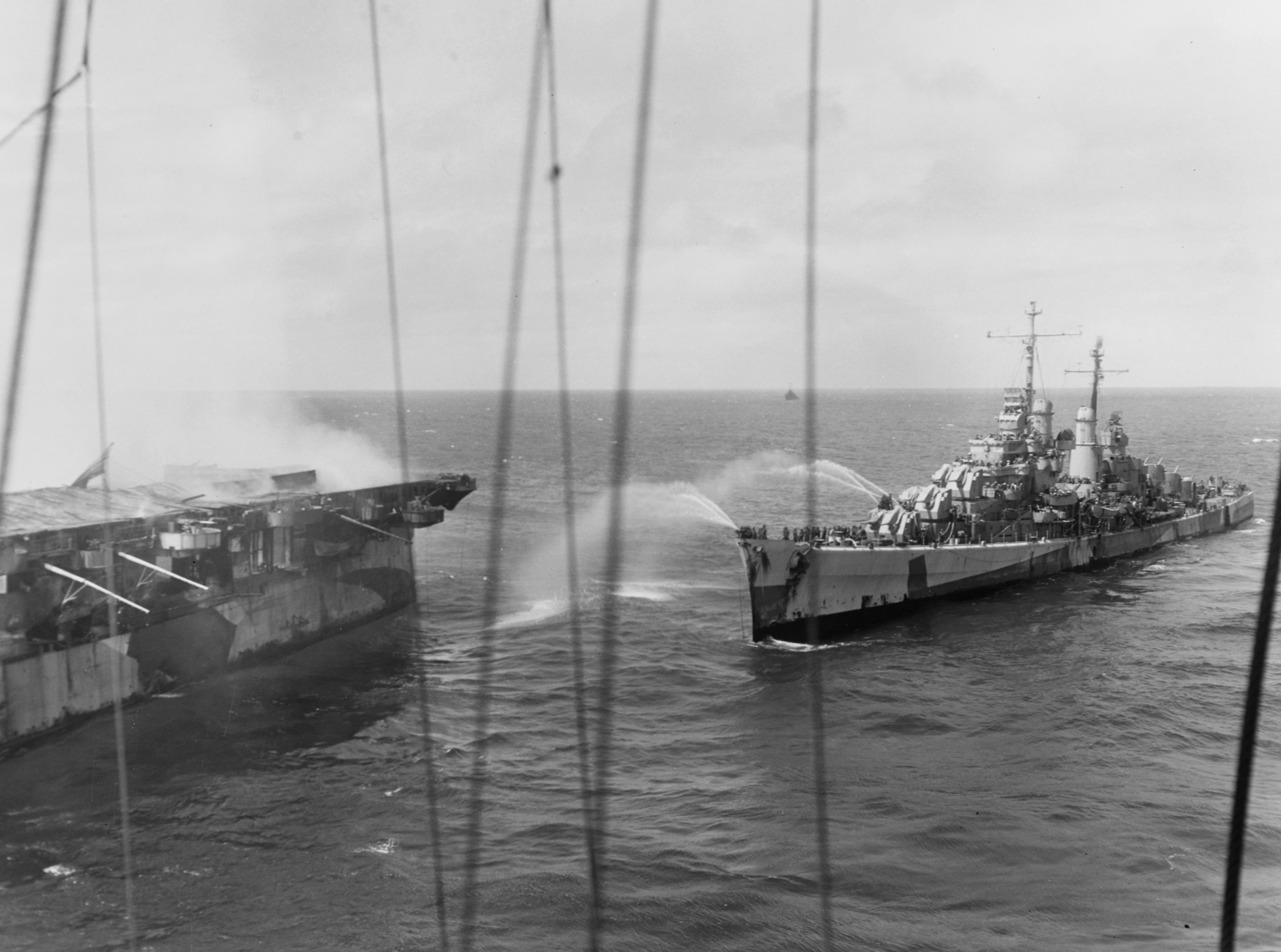
Reno coming alongside USS Princeton to assist with fighting fires on 24 October 1944

While Reno was assisting Princeton, the carrier began listing and her flight deck struck Reno, crushing one of her 40 mm mounts. Efforts to save the aircraft carrier continued, but when Princeton's torpedo warhead magazine exploded, Reno was ordered to sink Princeton with her own torpedoes.

On 25 October, having rejoined TF 38, Reno and the other warships steamed northward to engage the Japanese Northern Force, setting off the Battle off Cape Engaño, which was the final engagement of the Battle for Leyte Gulf.

==== I-41 attack ====
On the night of 3 November 1944, well east of the San Bernardino Strait, as part of Admiral Sherman's Task Group 3 (TG 38.3) of Task Force (TF 38) Fast Carrier Task Force, Reno received two torpedo hits on her port side fired from Japanese submarine I-41 while escorting Lexington. One torpedo lodged in the outer hull of Reno and was later defused. The second hit exploded four decks below topside. This was the first time in almost two years that a Japanese submarine successfully attacked a ship operating with fast carriers. Casualties were 46 dead and many injured.

After a night dead in the water, she survived yet another attempt to sink her by an unknown Japanese submarine firing three torpedoes that missed, but was rescued by a destroyer left behind to defend her. Reno was towed 1,500 miles (2,400 km) to the major American base at Ulithi Atoll for some temporary repairs by fleet tug USS Zuni. Among other measures taken to reduce topweight, her starboard torpedo tubes were jettisoned to help preserve stability in the damaged state. During this 700-mile voyage, a crew of 242 remained aboard. A total of 1250 tons of seawater was pumped from flooded compartments, a feat noted favorably by Vice Admiral Charles McMorris in his November 1944 endorsement of Reno's report on the torpedoing. Gunnery officer Arthur R. Gralla received the Navy and Marine Corps Medal for his role leading the dewatering effort in difficult conditions.

=== Repairs in Charleston, South Carolina ===
She then steamed under her own power across the Pacific, through the Panama Canal, then to Charleston, S.C., where she entered Charleston Navy Yard on 22 March 1945 for heavy repairs. Emerging seven months later, Reno was ordered to the Texas coast, then back to Charleston for the addition of hundreds of bunk spaces. She then reported for "Operation Magic Carpet," steaming roundtrip twice to Le Havre, France bringing home U.S. Army troops.

=== Decommission ===
In early 1946, Reno steamed to Port Angeles, Washington, where she decommissioned on 4 November 1946, and then entered the Pacific Reserve Fleet, berthed at Bremerton, Washington. Reclassified CLAA-96 18 March 1949, she remained at Bremerton until her name was struck from the Naval Vessel Register 1 March 1959. Her hulk was sold on 22 March 1962 to the Coal Export Co., of New York City, for scrapping.

One of Reno's 5-inch gun turrets was kept for display at the U.S. Navy Museum, in eastern Washington, D.C. The ship's bell and flag are on display in City Hall in Reno, Nevada. During the BLM riots in May/June 2020 the flag was taken by a concerned citizen to protect it from being burned after the Reno City Hall and downtown area was attacked and looted. It was later returned anonymously to a local news station with a handwritten note that read, "Needed protecting. Looters were flag burning. R.i.P Gorge[sic] Floyd".

== Awards ==
Reno earned three battle stars for World War II service.
