= USS Batfish =

Two ships of the United States Navy have borne the name USS Batfish, named in honor of the batfish, any of several fishes; a pediculate fish of the West Indies, the flying gurnard of the Atlantic, or a California sting ray.

- USS Batfish (SS-310), was a Balao-class submarine, commissioned in 1943 and struck in 1972.
- USS Batfish (SSN-681), was a Sturgeon-class submarine, commissioned in 1972 and struck in 1999.
