= Arthur R. Gralla =

United States Navy admiral

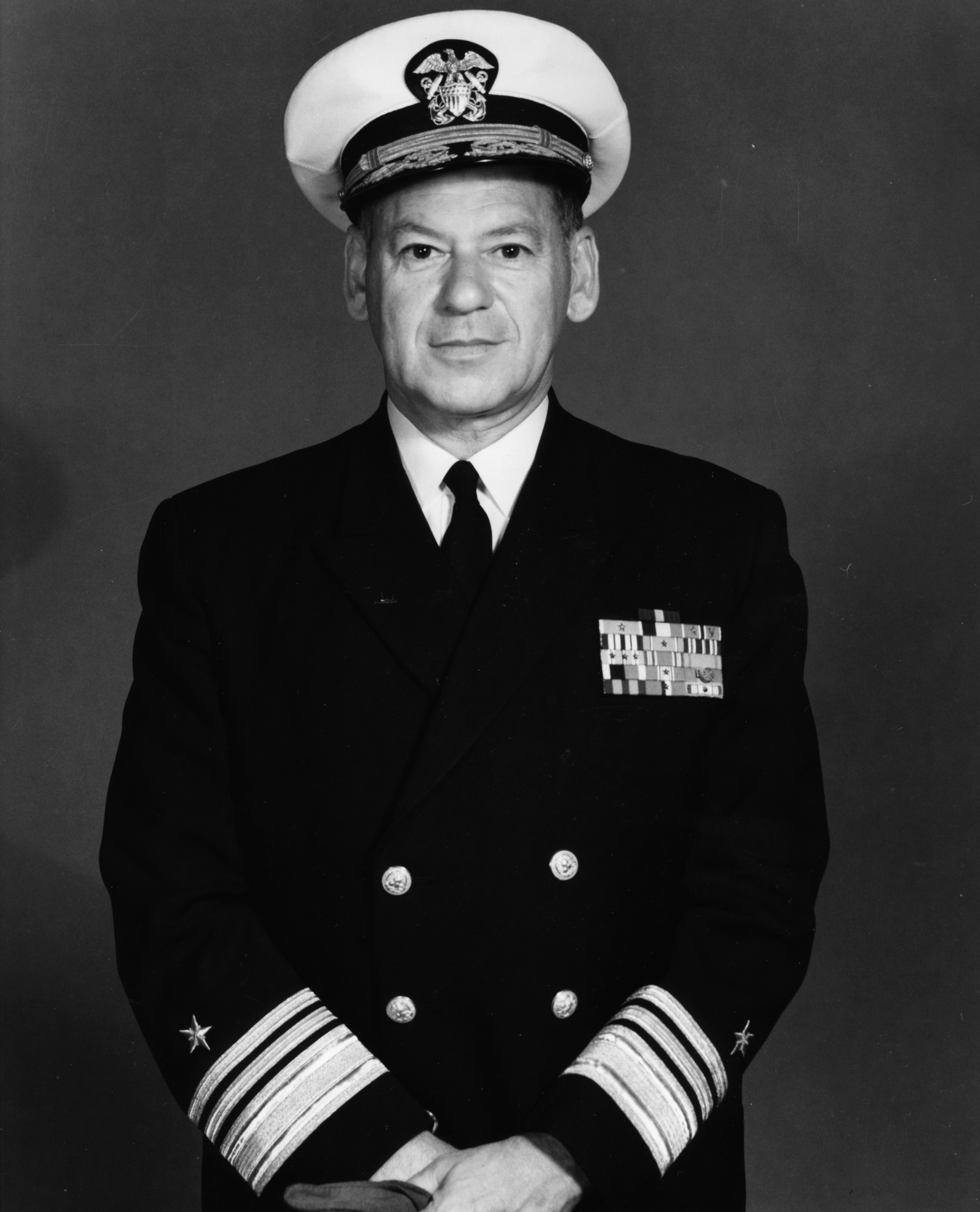
- Vice Admiral Arthur R. Gralla
- Born: April 21, 1913; Brooklyn, New York, United States
- Died: May 22, 1998 (aged 85); McLean, Virginia, United States
- Burial place: Arlington National Cemetery (Section 66, Site 4357-A)
- Military career
- Allegiance: United States
- Branch: United States Navy
- Service years: 1934–1971
- Rank: Vice Admiral
- Commands: USS Dennis J. Buckley; Naval Ordnance Test Unit; USS Norton Sound; Task Force 88, Operation Argus; Bureau of Ordnance; Destroyer Flotilla II, Atlantic Fleet; Military Sealift Command
- Awards: Bronze Star with Gold Star device Navy and Marine Corps Medal; Legion of Merit; Defense Distinguished Service Medal

Arthur Robert Gralla (April 21, 1913 – May 22, 1998) was an American sailor who rose to the rank of Vice Admiral in the United States Navy.

Born and raised in Brooklyn, Gralla spent time in the U.S. Merchant Marine before entering the United States Naval Academy. He was decorated for several actions while serving as gunnery officer aboard the USS Reno in the Pacific theater of World War II in 1944. He then held a number of command and staff appointments before being decorated again for his role commanding a missile test task force as part of Operation Argus. As Vice Admiral, he was briefly Naval Inspector General before being named Commander, Military Sealift Command.

Gralla studied at Brooklyn College before entering the Naval Academy. He also earned a master's degree from the Massachusetts Institute of Technology (MIT).

== Early life and education ==
Gralla was born April 21, 1913, in Brooklyn, New York. His father was chief clerk at the headquarters of the New York Police Department. Gralla was raised in the Brownsville neighborhood, where he attended a Hebrew school.

While attending Brooklyn College, Gralla spent a summer as an apprentice seaman in the U.S. Merchant Marine. He then enrolled in the United States Naval Academy, graduating in 1934 with honors, ninth out of a class of 463. In 1942 he earned a master's degree in electrical engineering from MIT, where he was elected to Sigma Xi.

== Naval career ==
After commissioning, Gralla served aboard the USS Omaha. From 1937 to 1939, he was an aide to the commander of the Special Service Squadron. He then served aboard destroyers before beginning his studies at MIT. He studied ordnance engineering at MIT, and after graduating he spent part of 1942 as a researcher in the Bureau of Ordnance's Fire Control Research and Development Division.

Gralla then served in the Pacific theater of World War II, first aboard the USS Reno as gunnery officer. The Reno was an anti-aircraft cruiser. Gralla was decorated for his conduct in three engagements aboard the Reno in late 1944. In the first, on October 14, the Reno shot down 11 Japanese torpedo bombers. Then, on October 24, during the Battle of Leyte Gulf, the Reno engaged the enemy to shield the heavily damaged USS Princeton. Finally, on November 3, after the Reno was struck by an enemy torpedo and began taking on water, Gralla led the dewatering effort, which saved the ship. For his role in these events, Gralla was awarded the Bronze Star, a Gold Star device in lieu of a second Bronze Star, and the Navy and Marine Corps Medal.

In 1945, Gralla became the gunnery officer of the USS Macon. After the war, he commanded the USS Dennis J. Buckley. Gralla then held a number of staff assignments, including in the office of the Chief of Naval Operations; the Air Defense Board; the Staff of the Commander-in-Chief, Naval Forces, Northern Europe and Mediterranean; and the office of the Deputy Chief of Naval Operations for Fleet Operations and Readiness. Gralla returned to command to commission and serve as the first commanding officer of the U.S. Naval Ordnance Test Unit at Patrick Air Force Base.

In August 1957, now-Captain Gralla assumed command of the USS Norton Sound. The Norton Sound was a missile test ship. As commander of the Norton Sound, Gralla led Task Force 88, a fleet of nine ships with 4,500 sailors. The task force tested nuclear-armed rockets as part of Operation Argus between July and September 1958. For his leadership, Gralla was awarded the Legion of Merit, with his citation praising his "unusual technical and professional competence, sound leadership, and outstanding initiative".

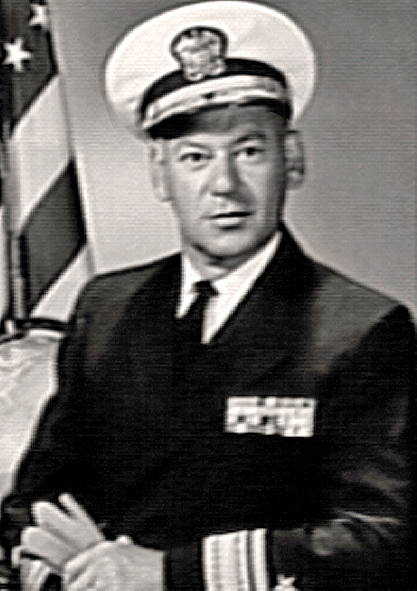
Gralla as Rear Admiral.

In September 1958 Gralla was ordered back to the Bureau of Ordnance in Washington, D.C. In 1961 he led an investigation of a deadly fire aboard the carrier USS Saratoga. In 1966 he was appointed Director of the reorganized Bureau of Ordnance Systems. Upon promotion to admiral, he commanded Destroyer Flotilla II in the Atlantic Fleet. He received the Defense Distinguished Service Medal for his work modernizing major weapons systems through the Naval Ordnance Systems Command. In 1969, he was promoted to Vice Admiral and named Naval Inspector General.

Later in 1969, Gralla received his final appointment, as commander of the Military Sea Transportation Service, which was renamed Military Sealift Command in 1970. In this role, he clashed with Deputy Secretary of Defense David Packard over Packard's proposal to place most U.S. military logistics under the Army. This would have included sealift, over which Gralla's service had jurisdiction. Much of the top brass agreed with Gralla, and ultimately Congress did not endorse Packard's plan. However, in November 1971, Gralla was forced into retirement in retaliation for testifying to Congress against Packard's plan.

== Personal life ==
Gralla married Mildred C. Lesser on May 31, 1936. They remained married until his death. They had two sons, Arthur R. Gralla Jr. and Richard J. Gralla.

Gralla was Jewish. He was the U.S. Navy's fourth Jewish Vice Admiral.

Later in life, Gralla settled in Arlington, Virginia. He died on May 22, 1998, at the Arleigh Burke Pavilion in McLean, Virginia from pneumonia. He is buried at Arlington National Cemetery.
