= USS Birmingham (CL-62) =

Cleveland-class light cruiser

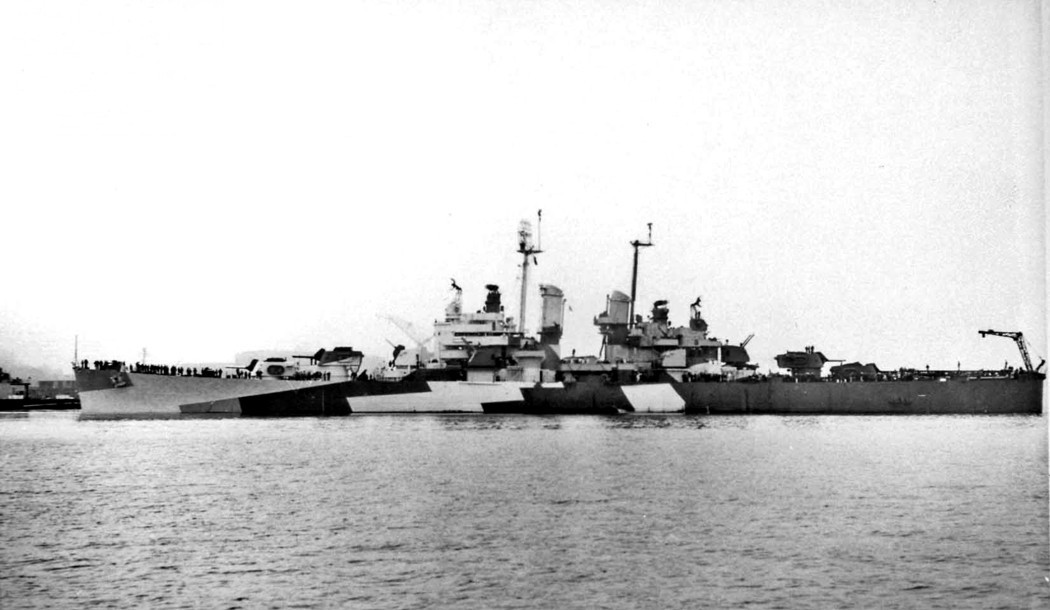
- Birmingham off the Mare Island Naval Shipyard, 7 February 1944

History

United States
- Name: Birmingham
- Namesake: City of Birmingham, Alabama
- Builder: Newport News Shipbuilding and Dry Dock Company, Newport News, Virginia
- Laid down: 17 February 1941
- Launched: 20 March 1942
- Commissioned: 29 January 1943
- Decommissioned: 2 January 1947
- Stricken: 1 March 1959
- Fate: Sold for scrap on 12 November 1959

General characteristics
- Class & type: Cleveland-class light cruiser
- Displacement: Standard: 11,744 long tons (11,932 t); Full load: 14,131 long tons (14,358 t)
- Length: 610 ft 1 in (185.95 m)
- Beam: 66 ft 4 in (20.22 m)
- Draft: 24 ft 6 in (7.47 m)
- Installed power: 4 × Babcock & Wilcox boilers; 100,000 shp (75,000 kW)
- Propulsion: 4 × steam turbines; 4 × screw propellers
- Speed: 32.5 knots (60.2 km/h; 37.4 mph)
- Range: 11,000 nmi (20,000 km; 13,000 mi) at 15 kn (28 km/h; 17 mph)
- Complement: 1,285 officers and enlisted
- Armament: 12 × 6 in (152 mm) Mark 16 guns; 12 × 5 in (127 mm)/38 caliber guns; 28 × 40 mm (1.6 in) Bofors anti-aircraft guns; 21 × 20 mm (0.79 in) Oerlikon anti-aircraft guns
- Armor: Belt: 3.5–5 in (89–127 mm); Deck: 2 in (51 mm); Barbettes: 6 in (152 mm); Turrets: 6 in (152 mm); Conning Tower: 5 in (127 mm)
- Aircraft carried: 4 × floatplanes
- Aviation facilities: 2 × stern catapults

USS Birmingham (hull number: CL-62) was a Cleveland-class light cruiser of the United States Navy, which were built during World War II. The class was designed as a development of the earlier Brooklyn-class cruisers, the size of which had been limited by the First London Naval Treaty. The start of the war led to the dissolution of the treaty system, but the dramatic need for new vessels precluded a new design, so the Clevelands used the same hull as their predecessors but were significantly heavier. The Clevelands carried a main battery of twelve 6-inch (152 mm) guns in four three-gun turrets, along with a secondary armament of twelve 5 in (127 mm) dual-purpose guns. They had a top speed of 32.5 knots (60.2 km/h; 37.4 mph).

She was laid down at the Newport News Shipbuilding and Dry Dock Company of Newport News, Virginia, on 17 February 1941 and launched on 20 March 1942 by Mrs. Cooper Green, wife of the president of the Birmingham City Commission. She was commissioned on 29 January 1943, Captain John Wilkes in command. Birmingham earned eight battle stars, receiving heavy damage on at least three occasions.

== Design ==
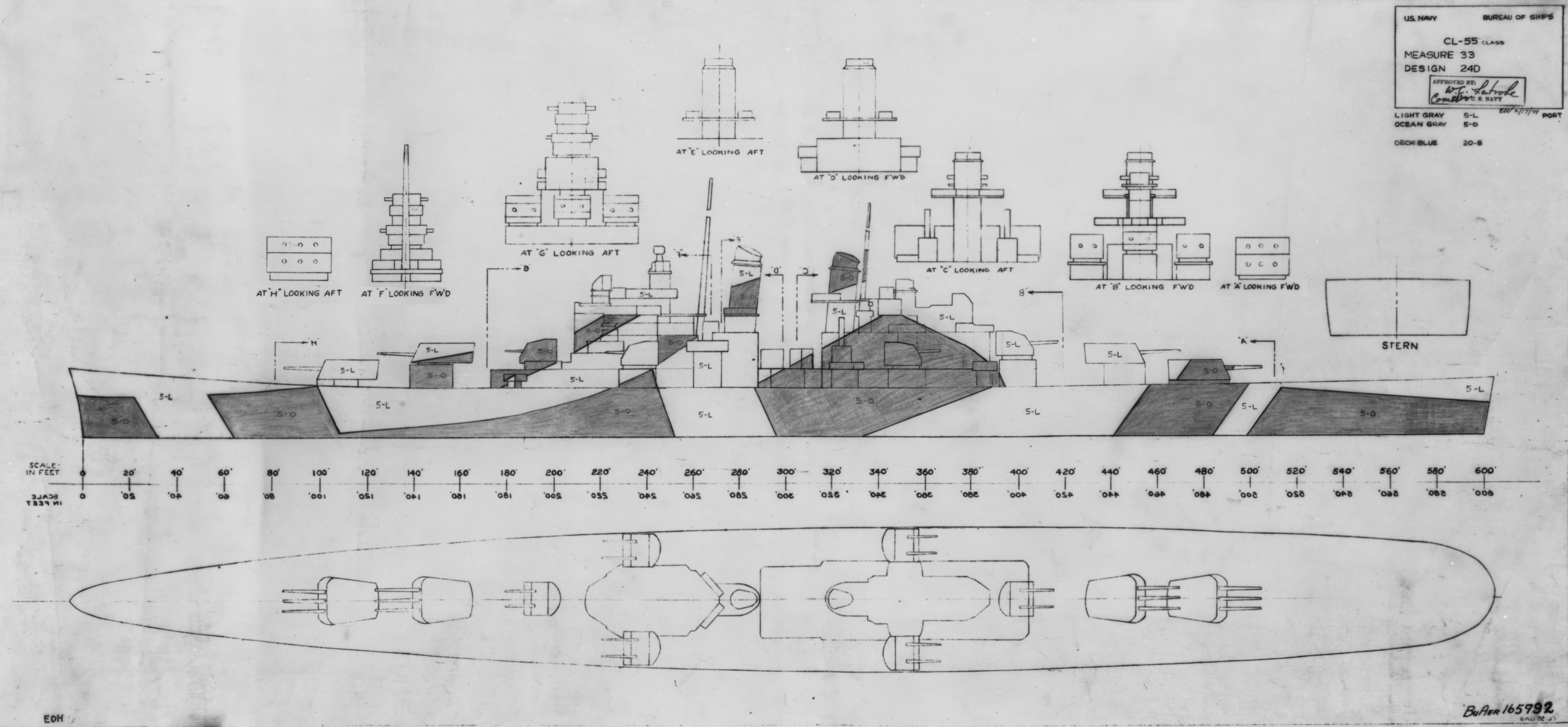
Depiction of the Cleveland class, showing the plan and profile

The Cleveland-class light cruisers traced their origin to design work done in the late 1930s; at the time, light cruiser displacement was limited to 8,000 long tons (8,100 t) by the Second London Naval Treaty. Following the start of World War II in September 1939, Britain announced it would suspend the treaty for the duration of the conflict, a decision the US Navy quickly followed. Though still neutral, the United States recognized that war was likely and the urgent need for additional ships ruled out an entirely new design, so the Clevelands were a close development of the earlier Brooklyn-class cruisers, the chief difference being the substitution of a two-gun 5 in (127 mm) dual-purpose gun mount for one of the main battery 6 in (152 mm) gun turrets.

Birmingham was 610 feet 1 inch (186 m) long overall and had a beam of 66 ft 4 in (20.22 m) and a draft of 24 ft 6 in (7.47 m). Her standard displacement amounted to 11,744 long tons (11,932 t) and increased to 14,131 long tons (14,358 t) at full load. The ship was powered by four General Electric steam turbines, each driving one propeller shaft, using steam provided by four oil-fired Babcock & Wilcox boilers. Rated at 100,000 shaft horsepower (75,000 kW), the turbines were intended to give a top speed of 32.5 knots (60.2 km/h; 37.4 mph). Her crew numbered 1285 officers and enlisted men.

The ship was armed with a main battery of twelve 6 in /47-caliber Mark 16 guns (Note: /47 refers to the length of the gun in terms of calibers. A /47 gun is 47 times long as it is in bore diameter.) in four 3-gun turrets on the centerline. Two were placed forward in a superfiring pair; the other two turrets were placed aft of the superstructure in another superfiring pair. The secondary battery consisted of twelve 5 in (127 mm) /38-caliber dual-purpose guns mounted in twin turrets. Two of these were placed on the centerline, one directly behind the forward main turrets and the other just forward of the aft turrets. Two more were placed abreast of the conning tower and the other pair on either side of the aft superstructure. Anti-aircraft defense consisted of twenty-eight Bofors 40 mm (1.6 in) guns in four quadruple and six double mounts and twenty-one Oerlikon 20 mm (0.79 in) guns in single mounts.

The ship's belt armor ranged in thickness from 3.5 to 5 in (89 to 127 mm), with the thicker section amidships where it protected the ammunition magazines and propulsion machinery spaces. Her deck armor was 2 in (51 mm) thick. The main battery turrets were protected with 6.5 in (170 mm) faces and 3 in (76 mm) sides and tops, and they were supported by barbettes 6 inches thick. Birmingham's conning tower had 5-inch sides.

== Service history ==
Birmingham was laid down at the Newport News Shipbuilding & Dry Dock Company at Newport News, Virginia on 17 February 1941. The completed hull was launched on 20 March 1942. Fitting-out work was completed less than a year later, by which time she had been moved to the Norfolk Naval Shipyard, and she was commissioned there on 29 January 1943. Captain John E. Wilkes served as the ship's first commander. On 20 February, Birmingham embarked on her shakedown cruise in the Chesapeake Bay, which also included gunnery tests to confirm the structural integrity of her main battery turrets, practice launching and recovering her seaplanes, and shooting practice for her gun crews. On 19 March, the ship sailed for Annapolis, Maryland, to be inspected, before returning to Norfolk on 3 April for repairs. Another round of initial training followed in the Chesapeake from 23 April, including night firing practice, refueling at sea, and fighter director exercises. In late May, she returned to Norfolk for additional repairs, before departing on 8 June for the Mediterranean Sea to join forces then engaged in the Mediterranean Theater.

=== World War II ===
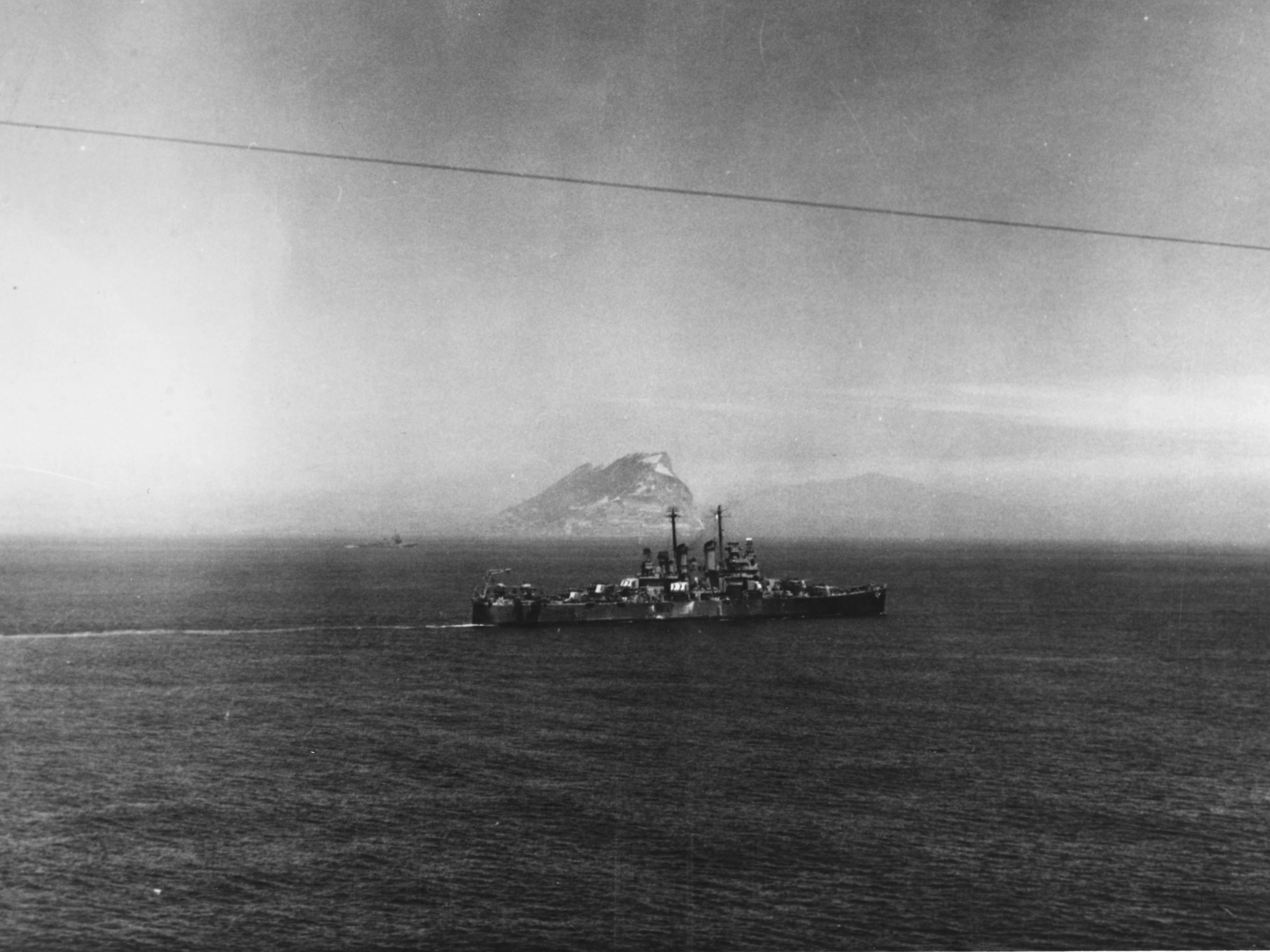
Birmingham passing through the Strait of Gibraltar

==== European Theater ====
Birmingham reached Mers El Kébir in French Algeria on 22 June, where she made preparations to join the invasion fleet that was to conduct Operation Husky, the invasion of Sicily. She was assigned to Task Group (TG) 86.1, along with the light cruiser Brooklyn and the destroyers Buck and Ludlow, which sortied on 29 June. The ships escorted part of the invasion force, which arrived off the landing beaches on the morning of 9 July. TG 86.1 helped guide the landing ships to their designated beaches, after which Birmingham shifted to shore bombardment to cover their approach. She launched two of her seaplanes to help spot the fall of shot and search for Axis artillery batteries.

During operations off the invasion beaches, Birmingham was escorted by Ludlow and the destroyer Edison. Poor visibility hampered the cruiser's gunners, and her aircraft were repeatedly engaged by friendly forces that mistook them for hostile planes. At 07:15, one of the aircraft returned to Birmingham, having been badly damaged by friendly ground fire and a German Messerschmitt Bf 109 fighter, and half an hour later, the second seaplane withdrew as well, having nearly been shot down by a pair of British Bell P-39 Airacobra fighters. At 09:18, Birmingham checked her fire, as Allied ground forces had achieved their initial objectives by that time. The ship continued to operate off the Sicilian coast for the next nine days, providing fire support to ground forces as they fought their way inland, and protecting minesweepers as they cleared Axis mines from the area.

Birmingham left the waters off Sicily on 21 July to refuel at Bizerte in French Tunisia; she thereafter sailed to Algiers in French Algeria before moving on to Mers El Kébir. On 27 July, she departed for the United States, arriving in Norfolk on 8 August, where she underwent repairs that lasted for ten days. From there, she sailed to join the forces engaged with Japan in the Pacific Ocean. She passed through the Panama Canal on 22 August and reached Pearl Harbor in Hawaii on 5 September.

==== Pacific Theater ====
After arriving in Pearl Harbor, Birmingham was assigned to TG 15.1 as part of the escort for the aircraft carrier Lexington and the light carriers Belleau Wood and Princeton. The unit sortied on 11 September to launch a raid on Japanese positions at Tarawa and Makin, returning to Pearl Harbor on 23 September. After refueling and rearming, they sortied again on 29 September to attack Wake Island. Birmingham was detached from the carrier group on 5 October to carry out shore bombardments of the island, targeting coastal batteries and storage dumps. Her spotter aircraft came under attack by a Mitsubishi A6M Zero, but the spotter was only hit by two bullets from the Zero before it escaped. TG 15.1 left the area on 6 October and arrived back in Pearl Harbor five days later.

===== Solomon Islands operations =====
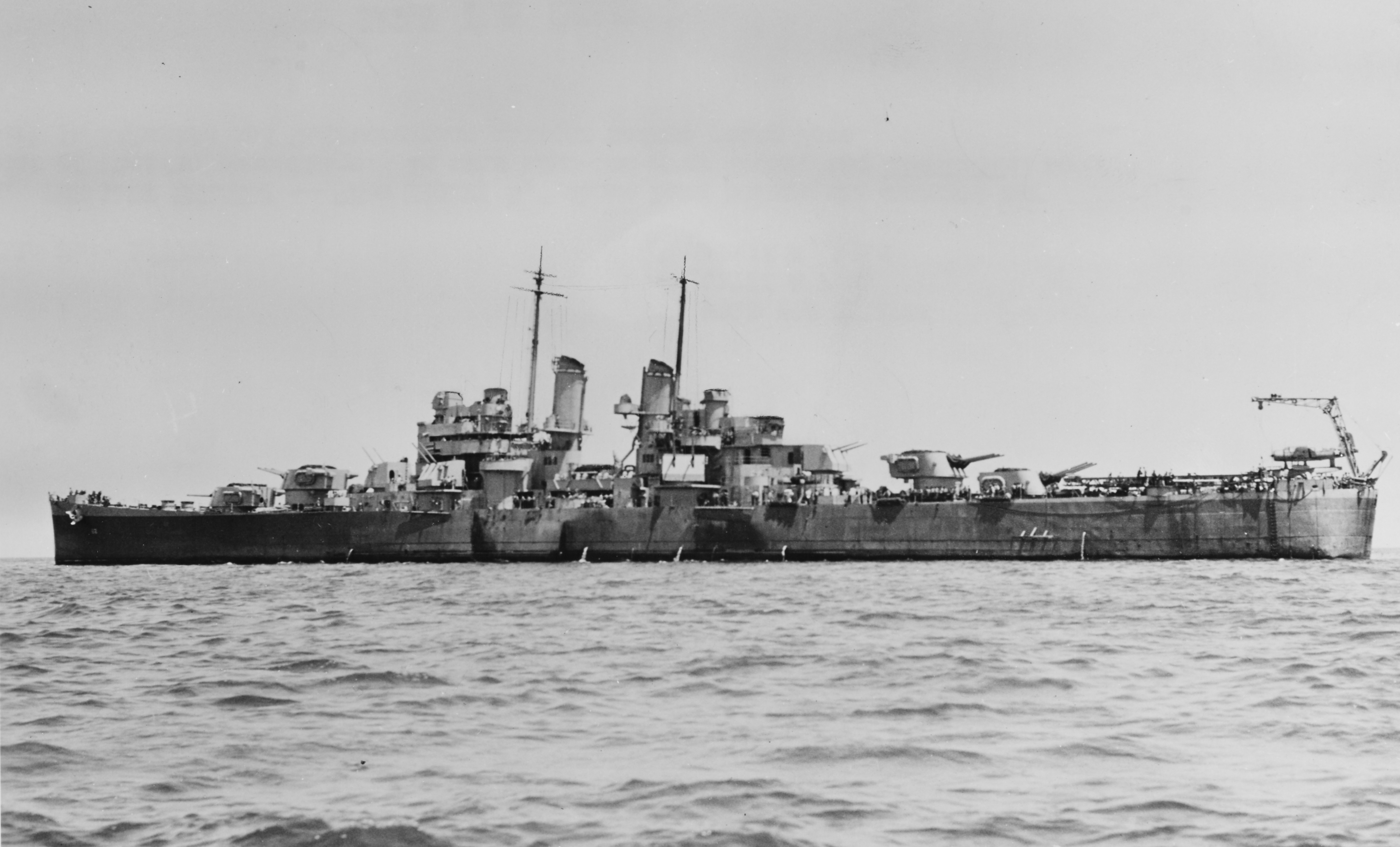
Birmingham early in her career, c. February 1943

Birmingham was reassigned to the Solomon Islands campaign, and she got underway on 21 October to join the naval forces operating there. She reached Espiritu Santo on 4 November, and the next day joined the escort for a convoy of six transport ships headed to Bougainville; two other light cruisers and four destroyers comprised the rest of the escort group. The group safely arrived in Empress Augusta Bay on the morning of 8 November and while they were unloading their cargoes, Birmingham and the other escorts patrolled to the southwest of the bay. Throughout the afternoon and early evening, Birmingham and her sister ship Mobile detected a total of thirteen Japanese aircraft in the distance, but none of them attacked the Allied flotilla during this period. At around 18:30, a Japanese Mitsubishi G4M medium bomber closed with the American ships. At the same time, the air-search radars on the American cruisers picked up a large attack force incoming, at a distance of about 25,000 yd (23,000 m).

Birmingham and the other two cruisers opened fire with their main batteries at 19:11, at a range of 18,000 yd (16,000 m), to try to disrupt the incoming aerial attack. As the Japanese aircraft closed in the darkness, the American ships launched flares to illuminate the planes. Birmingham engaged an Aichi D3A Val that was approaching the ship and inflicted fatal damage with her 20 mm and 40 mm guns, though not before the Val released its bomb. It skipped on the water and struck Birmingham's hull on the starboard quarter; the explosion tore a hole in the hull that was 15 ft (4.6 m) wide and destroyed her aircraft hangar. Almost immediately after, another aircraft hit Birmingham with a torpedo on her port bow, blowing a 30 ft (9.1 m) hole and causing significant damage to the hull structure. Two of her fuel oil storage compartments were also flooded. The ship's damage control teams quickly moved to contain the flooding and suppress fires from both hits, but a second Val made an attack run at Birmingham. The anti-aircraft gunners destroyed the plane as it dove on Birmingham, but its bomb nevertheless struck turret #4. The mount and all three gun barrels were damaged in the blast. In total, the three attacks killed two men and wounded another thirty-two.

Birmingham was still able to steam at 30 knots (56 km/h; 35 mph) and maintain her position in the formation. Further Japanese attacks occurred throughout the night, but the ships' 5-inch guns kept the aircraft at bay. At 19:58, Birmingham shot down a G4M that was dropping flares over the formation, and later that night her 5-inch guns destroyed another G4M at a range of 4,000 yd (3,700 m). Birmingham withdrew without further damage, and reached the central Solomons by the morning; from there, the ships sailed on to Florida Island on 10 November. There, the ship received temporary repairs to shore up the damaged bulkheads. A vent for the flooded compartments in the bow was also created to reduce pressure on the forward bulkheads, and while steaming back to the United States, it created periodic geysers of water, which earned the ship the nickname "Old Faithful". Birmingham left Florida on 16 November for Espiritu Santo, though she stayed there only briefly before continuing on to Hawaii, which she reached on 1 December.

===== Repairs and training =====
The ship was dry docked in Pearl Harbor for repairs to her hull, and on 18 December she departed for the Mare Island Navy Yard in San Francisco, California, arriving there four days later. There, she underwent permanent repairs, including six new 6-inch guns and new aircraft catapults. On 7 February 1944, while she was being moved in the harbor, Birmingham accidentally collided with the merchant vessel Manukai, and had her bow damaged again. Further repairs were necessitated, which lasted about a week. She thereafter conducted a short shakedown cruise before sailing from Mare Island on 18 February to return to Pearl Harbor, arriving there on 23 February. The ship thereafter took part in training exercises off Kahoʻolawe in the Hawaiian islands before leaving Hawaii on 5 March. She sailed next to the Ellice Islands, refueling at Funafuti on 10 March, before continuing on to the Solomons. She arrived in Purvis Bay there four days later, where she was assigned to Task Group 53.1.

Birmingham spent the next two months conducting training exercises in preparation for upcoming amphibious invasions planned for the Marianas Islands. These exercises included shore bombardment practice and coordination practice between shore-based fire control teams and the ship's gunners, along with bombardments of Japanese positions on the Shortland Islands in company with her sisters Cleveland and Montpelier and four destroyers. During this action, she engaged in a gunnery duel with shore batteries on the island. On 24 May, she took part in a large-scale simulated amphibious invasion on Guadalcanal, which included live-fire practice in Kula Gulf. On 3 June, the ship returned to Purvis Bay, by which time some fifty men aboard the vessel were suffering from bacillary dysentery. As a result, the ship's medical team fumigated the ship to kill disease-carrying insects. The next day, she sortied as part of the escort for a convoy of transports and Landing Ships, Tank bound for the Marshall Islands, which were being used as the staging ground for the upcoming invasion of the Marianas. Dysentary continued to spread among the crew, and by 10 June, a total of 244 men had been infected. She nevertheless sailed that day as part of the invasion fleet.

===== Mariana and Palau Islands campaign =====
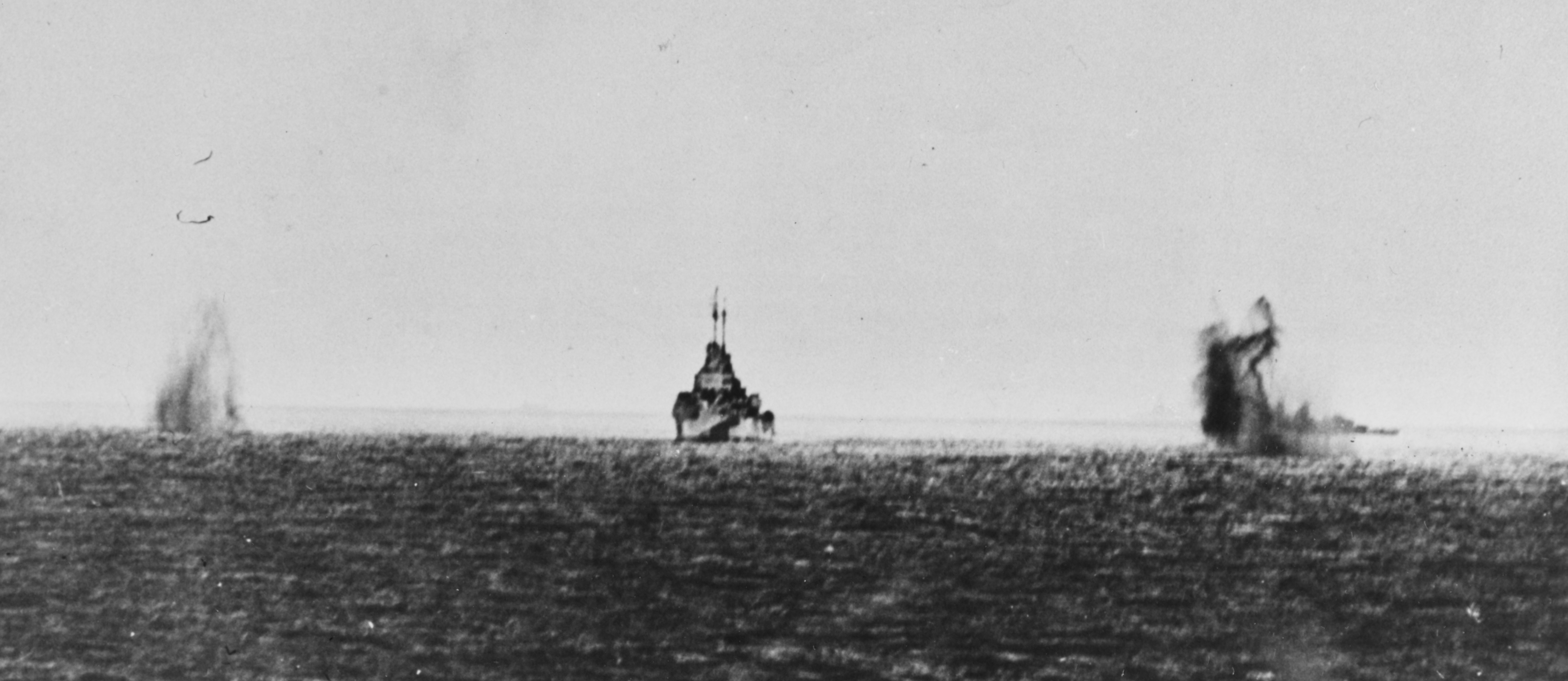
Birmingham under fire from Japanese coastal artillery off Saipan

Birmingham was transferred to TG 52.17, which arrived off Saipan on 14 June for the imminent invasion of Saipan; the ship protected minesweepers clearing Japanese mines off the island and covered Underwater Demolition Teams (UDT) clearing obstacles around the landing beaches. She also fired on Japanese positions in the area. The next day, Birmingham cruised off Garapan to cover UDTs on the beach and engaged Japanese coastal artillery and anti-aircraft guns in the area. She then closed to 3,000 yd (2,700 m) from shore, and at 08:46, she came under heavy fire from several Japanese guns. The ship received light damage to her upper works, but quickly returned fire, and over the course of the next two hours, silenced most of the guns and destroyed two ammunition dumps being used to supply them. In the course of the action, she had fired 1,345 rounds from her main battery and 1,172 shells from her secondary guns. Later in the day, she again closed with the beach to draw fire from shore guns, which were then engaged by American carrier planes.

On 16 June, Birmingham returned to the invasion beaches and joined the shore bombardment group that supported the ground forces as they went ashore. Birmingham shelled Japanese positions near an airfield as marines fought to secure it. By 09:00, her crew had begun coordinating with a ground-based fire control team, and the ship spent the rest of the day responding to fire support requests. Later that day, she was assigned to Task Unit 52.1.1, which spent the next two days bombarding Japanese positions on Saipan and neighboring Tinian. By that time, the US had received reports of a large scale Japanese counteroffensive approaching from the Philippines. Birmingham accordingly withdrew to replenish ammunition and stores from the attack cargo ship Alhena before rejoining the fleet on 17 June.

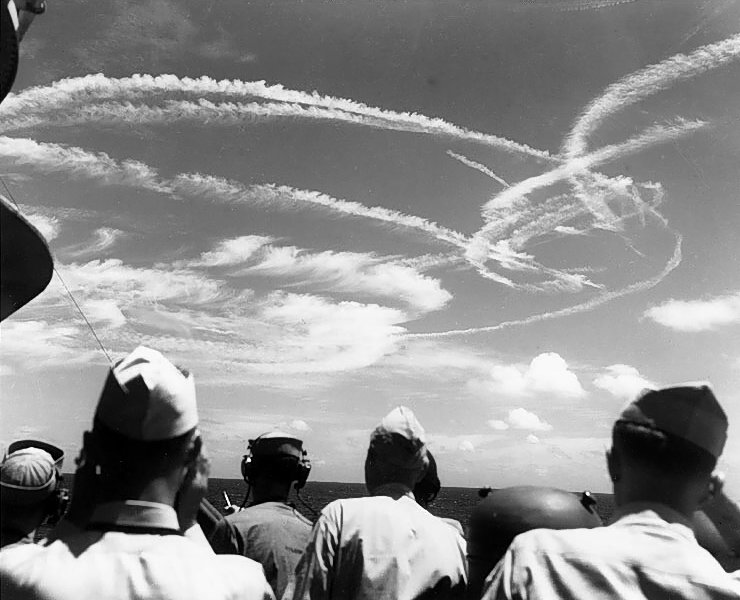
Contrails from American and Japanese aircraft during the Battle of the Philippine Sea, seen from Birmingham

The ship joined TG 58.3, which was centered on the aircraft carrier Enterprise and the light carriers Princeton and San Jacinto. The fleet had positioned itself some 150 nmi (280 km; 170 mi) to the west of the Marianas to protect the invasion force. Japanese patrol aircraft located the American fleet on the morning of 19 June and, in the ensuing Battle of the Philippine Sea, launched a series of air strikes, but American combat air patrols intercepted most of them before they reached the fleet. After shooting down hundreds of Japanese aircraft, the American aircraft launched strikes of their own against the Japanese carriers on 20 June and inflicted further losses on the Japanese fleet, including the sinking of the carrier Hiyō. The American aircraft arrived back at their carriers late in the evening and faced difficult night landings; Birmingham assisted by lighting signal smoke pots, and she also put life rafts to rescue pilots who had to ditch their aircraft at sea. The Americans pursued the retreating Japanese on 21 June, but were unable to catch them and returned to the Marianas.

Birmingham next left the fleet on 26 June in company with three destroyers to shell Japanese positions on Tinian, particularly in Tinian Town, the main settlement on the island. They also used white phosphorus shells to set fire to sugar cane fields near the town, and they sank five sampans in port. The Americans then withdrew to replenish ammunition before returning to Tinian the next day for further bombardments. Over the course of the day's shelling, the ships destroyed about seventy-five percent of Tinian Town and burned much of the surrounding farmland. Birmingham moved back to Saipan on 28 June and resumed gunfire support duties off Garapan, which she carried out for the next several days. These operations included destroying three Japanese tanks on 5 July. The next day, Birmingham returned to Tinian to resume attacks on that island through the day, before withdrawing later in the evening.

With Saipan under American control, the ship next joined the bombardment group covering the invasion of Guam on 21 July. She attacked Japanese positions on the island as American troops went ashore but encountered little return fire. On 23 July, she returned to Saipan to begin preparatory bombardments for the invasion of Tinian, which took place two days later. During the preparatory phase, Birmingham closed with the shore and used her 20 mm and 40 mm guns to attack Japanese trench lines. On the 25th, one of her spotter aircraft estimated that the ship had killed approximately 250 soldiers. She remained off Tinian through 1 August, bombarding Japanese forces as American troops fought to secure the island. In the course of operations during the campaign, Birmingham fired a total of 7,683 rounds from her main guns and 10,875 shells from her 5-inch guns. On 7 August, Birmingham got underway, bound for Eniwetok for maintenance and to replenish ammunition and stores in preparation for the next stage of the campaign.

She then joined TG 38.5, which sortied on 3 September to attack the Palau Islands in the western Carolines. She joined the screen for the carriers Essex and Lexington and the light carrier Langley, which carried out a series of air strikes on Angaur, Pelelieu, and Babeldaob between 6 and 7 September. These marked the beginning of preparatory attacks leading to the invasion of Pelelieu the following week. The Fast Carrier Task Force moved on to attack airfields in the southern Philippines, both to draw Japanese attention away from Palau and to neutralize aircraft that might interfere with the invasion. These attacks began on 9 September. During one of these raids, aircraft spotted a Japanese convoy of small coastal vessels off Mindanao; Birmingham, her sister Santa Fe, and the destroyers Laws, Longshaw, Morrison, and Pritchett were detached to intercept it. American aircraft helped direct the ships to their target, and in the course of the action, Birmingham sank three cargo ships, a large sampan, and a small motor boat, and she assisted in the destruction of eight smaller vessels. Birmingham and the rest of the ships returned to the carriers, which continued to strike targets in the Philippines through 12 September. During this period, Birmingham used one of her seaplanes to recover a downed pilot from the carrier Wasp. The fleet returned to the Carolines for further strikes there, before resuming attacks on the Philippines later in September. On 27 September, the fleet withdrew to the Kossol Roads to refuel and replenish ammunition.

===== Philippines campaign =====
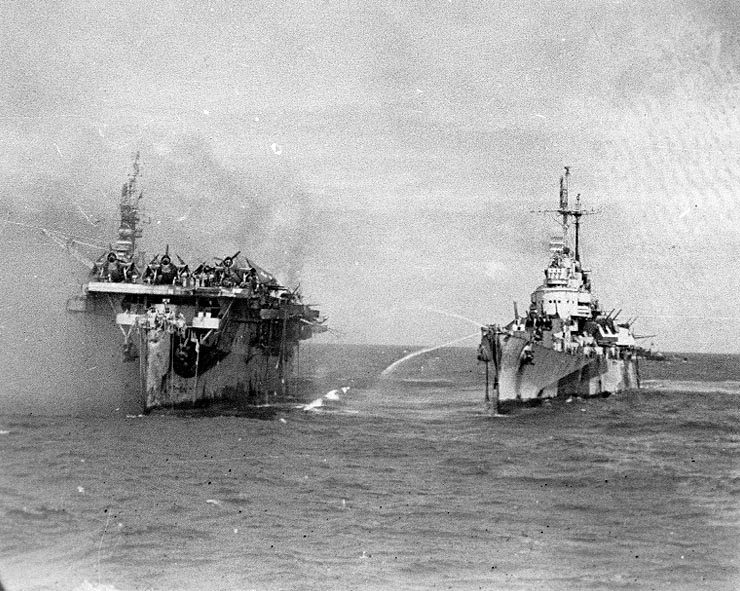
Birmingham alongside the burning Princeton during the Battle of Leyte Gulf on 24 October 1944

The fleet then moved north to its next staging ground at Ulithi, and Birmingham arrived there on 2 October. There, she was assigned to TG 38.3, which sortied the next day to carry out an attack on the Ryukyu Islands. This raid was intended to reduce Japanese forces in the region that might interfere with the planned invasion of Leyte in the Philippines. The Fast Carrier Task Force arrived off the Ryukyus on 10 October and inflicted significant damage to Japanese aircraft and installations on the islands. The following day, the carriers turned their attention to the island of Luzon in the Philippines, striking airfields there and then shifting once again to Formosa on 12 October. The Formosa Air Battle continued into the next day, which saw intense Japanese counterattacks that damaged the heavy cruiser Canberra. Birmingham was among the vessels detached to cover the withdrawal of Canberra, which was towed by the heavy cruiser Wichita. The carriers' combat air patrol kept Japanese aircraft at bay, but later that morning, Birmingham left the Canberra group to cover the withdrawal of her sister Houston, which had also been badly damaged by a Japanese torpedo bomber. The ships were still retreating on 16 October when they came under attack once again; Birmingham shot down a Nakajima B6N torpedo bomber, but it had already hit Houston with another torpedo. Birmingham also assisted in the destruction of another B6N that had attempted to attack Santa Fe.

Birmingham left the withdrawing formation on 17 October and rejoined TG 38.3, where she refueled at sea from the oiler Tappahannock. The Fast Carrier Task Force then covered the invasion of Leyte from 19 October, carrying out air strikes on various targets through the Philippines. Japanese air forces launched a series of counterattacks on 24 October, and during one of these, a Yokosuka D4Y dive bomber scored a hit on Princeton that caused serious damage and several large fires; Birmingham and the three destroyers Morrison, Gatling and Irwin remained with the stricken carrier after she fell out of formation. The destroyers initially attempted to come alongside and spray the burning carrier to help the ship's crew suppress the fires, but they repeatedly collided with Princeton in the heavy seas. Birmingham then came alongside instead, as her larger hull could better absorb collisions. She sent thirty-eight men and fourteen water hoses over to Princeton, and they helped the carrier's crew put out one of the two large fires.

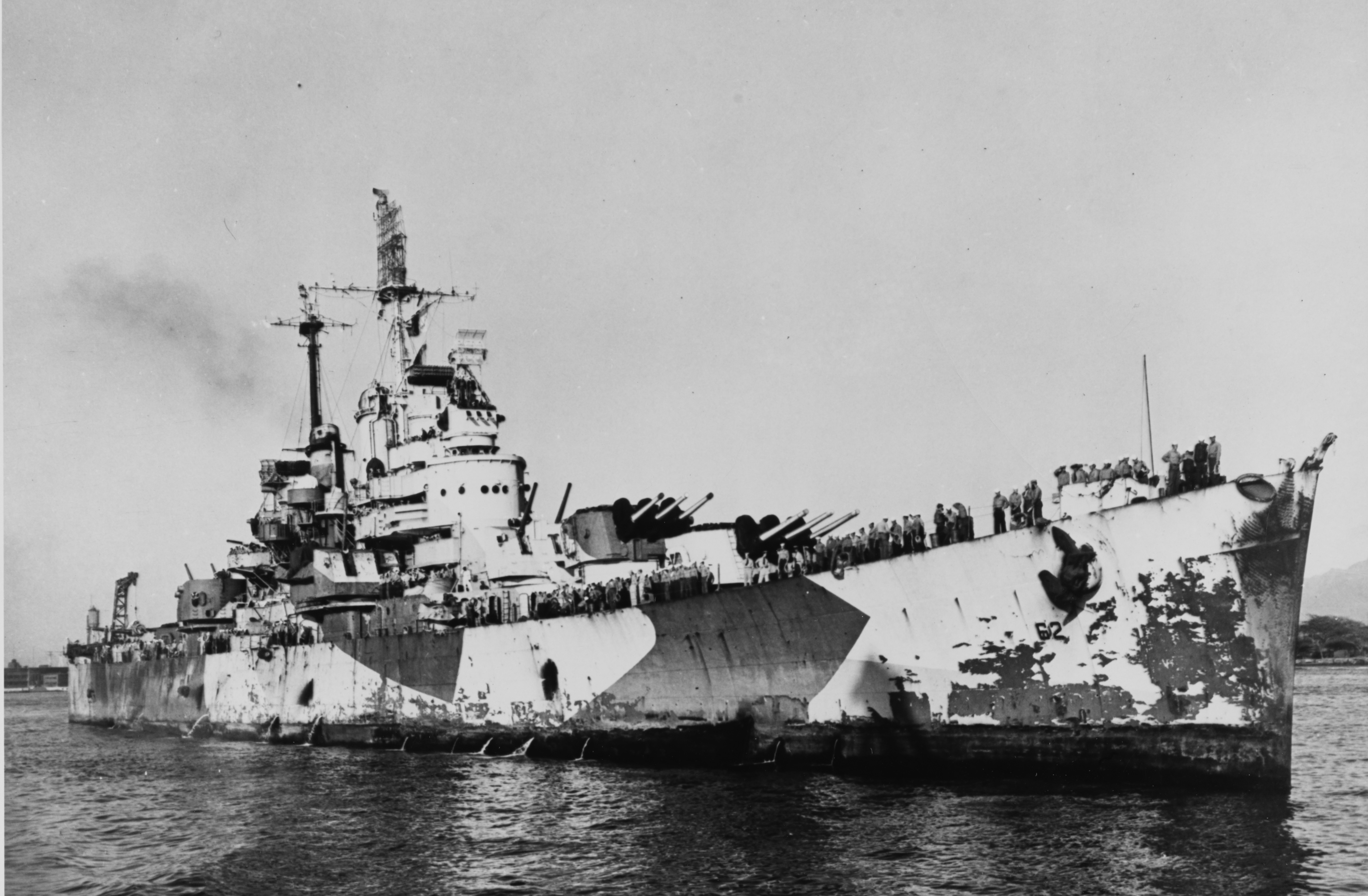
Birmingham after arriving at Mare Island, showing damage inflicted by the explosion aboard Princeton

Later in the day, Birmingham received reports of Japanese aircraft approaching, and around the same time, one of the destroyers reported detecting a submarine just 2,000 yd (1,800 m) away. Birmingham immediately pulled away from Princeton so she could evade any incoming attacks. Only one Japanese aircraft actually approached the formation, but it did not attack, and the submarine report was determined to have been a false alarm. Birmingham then returned alongside Princeton to resume firefighting, but at 15:22, just as she was coming back alongside Princeton, the fires reached the carrier's aft magazines, setting off a catastrophic explosion. The blast destroyed much of the carrier's stern, throwing debris all along Birmingham's starboard side and inflicting grave casualties among the cruiser's crew. Out of her crew of nearly 1,300, 241 men were killed, 211 were seriously wounded, and 201 received lighter injuries, more than half of the crew. The surviving crew began fighting several fires aboard Birmingham and treating the survivors, and then she broke off from the stricken carrier. Efforts continued aboard Princeton, but these ultimately proved futile, and Reno and Irwin scuttled her with torpedoes. Birmingham eventually arrived back at Mare Island in early November for repairs; during this period, she also received modifications to allow her to serve as a flagship. Her propulsion system was also overhauled, and she received all new 5- and 6-inch gun barrels, along with additional 20- and 40-millimeter gun mounts. Work on the ship was completed on 17 January 1945.

===== Battles of Iwo Jima and Okinawa =====
After returning to service, Birmingham briefly cruised off San Francisco to calibrate her equipment, before moving to San Diego for combat practice on 24 January. Over the next week, her crew took part in anti-aircraft gunnery drills, practicing operating her seaplanes, and other exercises, before departing on 4 February to rejoin the fleet. She stopped briefly in Pearl Harbor on the way, and arrived at Saipan on 25 February to refuel. The following day, she reached the fleet off Iwo Jima, where the Battle of Iwo Jima was already in full swing. On 1 March, she joined the coastal bombardment force and began engaging Japanese targets on the island. She operated there for the next five days, during which time she destroyed Japanese defensive positions in support of a marine advance on 1 March, supported another offensive on the eastern side of the island on 3 March, and shelled Japanese held caves from a distance of 2,550 yd (2,330 m) on 4 March. By that time, the marines had secured the airfield on the southern end of the island.

On 5 March, the heavy cruiser Salt Lake City replaced Birmingham in the shore bombardment unit, and the latter vessel departed for Ulithi. After arriving on 8 March, she began to make preparations for the planned attack on Okinawa. She and the rest of the invasion fleet sortied on 21 March for the Ryukyus, arriving off the island four days later. She took part in a preparatory bombardment on the morning of 25 March, she retired to cover minesweepers clearing paths for the invasion craft. The next day, she joined a bombardment group that consisted of the battleships Tennessee and Nevada, the light cruiser St. Louis, and the heavy cruiser Wichita, along with escorting destroyers. The unit was stationed off the western coast of Okinawa to support American ground forces there, which had not yet gone ashore. The American commanders believed that the Japanese units on the island might attempt to board vessels in the invasion fleet, Birmingham distributed M1918 Browning Automatic Rifles to the 20 mm and 40 mm gun crews to defend against boarders.

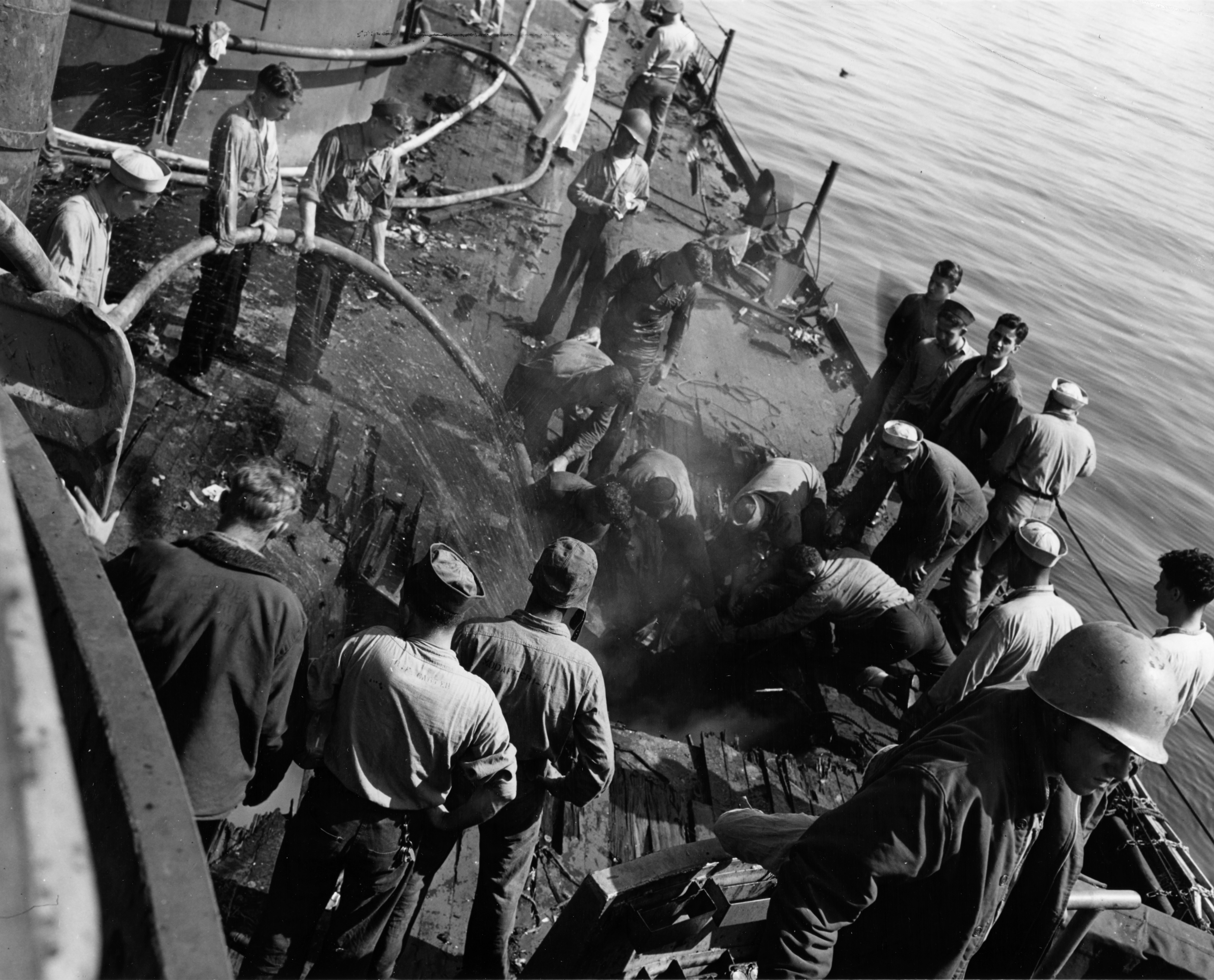
Birmingham's crew fighting a fire caused by the kamikaze attack on 4 May

On 26 March, numerous Japanese aircraft attacked the invasion fleet, and Birmingham's gunners contributed to the fleet's anti-aircraft defense. Later in the day, the bombardment group closed with the beaches to bombard Japanese defenses. Birmingham repeated these attacks in different sectors on 28 and 29 March, and also covered the operation of UDT units preparing the invasion beaches. The assault began on the morning of 1 April, and at 06:08, Birmingham opened fire on the target beaches. Shortly thereafter, a D3A bomber closed with the ship, but a 5-inch shell damaged the aircraft as it approached, slowing it so the 20 mm and 40 mm guns could take it under fire; the bomber exploded in mid-air some 50 yd (46 m) from the ship. Following the preparatory bombardment, the amphibious assault vessels began to go ashore, and Birmingham transferred control of her guns to a fire direction party ashore; she spent the rest of the day responding to requests for fire support as the soldiers and marines fought their way inland.

The ship remained off the island for the next several days, and on 6 April, she helped repel a large-scale aerial attack, during which her gunners shot down a D3A bomber and assisted with the destruction of three D4Y bombers. Planned fire support duty was canceled the following day when the American fleet received reports that the large battleship Yamato and several other vessels had sortied to attack the invasion fleet. Birmingham was among the vessels assembled to block the Japanese flotilla should it break through; she and two cruisers and ten destroyers took up a screening position on the right flank of the Allied fleet. At 19:11, Birmingham received news that American carrier aircraft had sunk Yamato, two light cruisers, and three destroyers, neutralizing the threat to the invasion beaches. She resumed bombardment duties the next day, remaining on station off the island until 12 April, when she was recalled to help defend the main fleet from a major Japanese air attack. During the action, her gunners claimed one Japanese aircraft.

Birmingham next moved to Iejima to conduct preparatory bombardments over the following three days before American forces landed on 16 April. The ship then withdrew to Kerama Retto to replenish ammunition and stores before returning to Okinawa to resume fire support missions there. These operations continued until 22 April, when she withdrew to Kerama Retto to take on more ammunition. She resumed bombarding Japanese positions on the island through the end of the month and into early May. These included attacks on the airfield at Naha to disrupt Japanese operations there. On 4 May, another major Japanese counterattack appeared, and at around 08:40, a Nakajima Ki-43 Hayabusa kamikaze made a diving attack on Birmingham; the pilot approached from such a steep angle that only the 20 mm guns could elevate high enough to engage the aircraft, and they lacked the power to destroy the plane before it crashed into the ship. The blast destroyed the ship's sick bay, penetrated three deck levels, and tore a hole in the hull below the waterline on the starboard side. The resulting fires were quickly suppressed and seriously injured men were transferred to the hospital ship Mercy. The kamikaze killed fifty-two men and wounded another eighty-two. Birmingham came alongside the salvage ship Shackle for temporary repairs before departing for Guam on 5 May; she arrived there five days later, where she was dry-docked on 13 May.

===== End of the war and later career =====
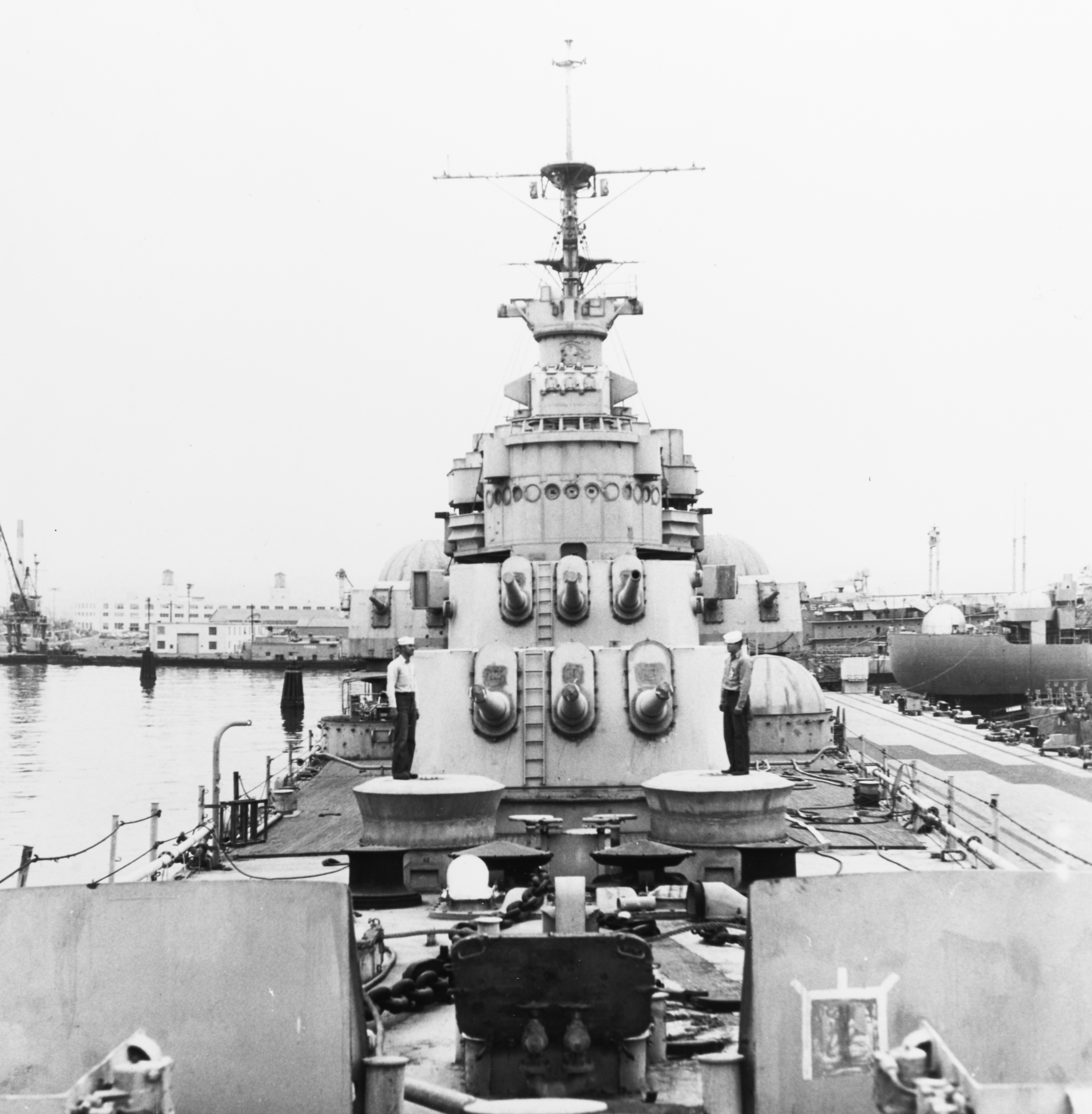
View from Birmingham's forecastle in December 1959, shortly after she was taken from the reserve fleet

On 21 May, Birmingham got underway to return to Pearl Harbor, arriving there seven days later. There, she was dry-docked at the Pearl Harbor Naval Shipyard on 7 June for repair work that lasted for six weeks. She emerged from the shipyard on 22 July, after which she took on ammunition, fuel, and stores before embarking on combat training in Hawaiian waters in preparation to resume operations against Japan. She departed Pearl Harbor on 12 August and joined TG 12.3, which was steaming to Wake Island, where she was to shell the isolated Japanese garrison there to practice gunnery drills. Three days later, while still en route to Wake, the ships received word that Japan had surrendered, so the attack on the island was called off. Over the course of her wartime career, Birmingham was awarded eight battle stars. The ship headed to Eniwetok, which she reached on 19 August. She refueled there and continued on to Okinawa, arriving there on 26 August. She was initially ordered to sail for Kyushu to take part in the occupation of Japan, and she got underway on 7 September, but while on the way her orders were changed to send her south to the naval forces stationed in Australia and New Guinea.

Birmingham sailed south, passing through Leyte on 14 September to refuel, and continuing on until she reached Brisbane, Australia, on 23 September. There, she became the flagship of Rear Admiral Clifford E. Van Hook, the commander of US naval forces in Australia. She served in this capacity for the next five months, cruising between Sydney, Melbourne, and Brisbane. The ship eventually returned to San Francisco on 22 March 1946. On 2 April, she was moved to San Diego, where she was assigned to the 19th Fleet, to be prepared for decommissioning. On 16 October, she was assigned to the Pacific Reserve Fleet, San Diego, and on 2 January 1947, she was formally decommissioned. She remained in the Navy's inventory for the next decade, ultimately being stricken from the Naval Vessel Register on 1 March 1959. Birmingham was then sold to the National Metals and Steel Corp. on 13 October to be broken up for scrap.
