= Batfish =

Batfish may refer to:

== Fish ==
- California batfish or bat ray (Myliobatis californicus), an eagle ray from the East Pacific
- Red lipped batfish or the galapagos batfish
- Ogcocephalidae, a family of anglerfish found in oceans worldwide
- Platax, a spadefish genus from the Indian and Pacific Oceans, and sometimes kept in aquariums
- Freshwater batfish (Myxocyprinus asiaticus), better known as the Chinese high fin banded shark, a catostomid sometimes kept in aquariums and aquaculture
- Members of the genus Halieutaea

== Other uses ==
- The Batfish Boys, a UK rock group who later shortened their name to Batfish
- USS Batfish, two submarines of the US Navy
