= Grala =

Grala ([ɡrˈala] is a Polish-language surname. It is derived from the Polish verb grać "to play", and literally is a nickname for a musician, "the one who plays". Notable people with the surname include:

- Darius Grala (born 1964), Polish racing driver
- Hieronim Grala (born 1957), Polish historian and diplomat
- Kaz Grala (born 1998), American stock car racing driver
- Marek Grala (1954–2022), Polish poet
