= USS Princeton (CVL-23) =

Independence-class light aircraft carrier of the US Navy

Coordinates: 15°21′N 123°31′E

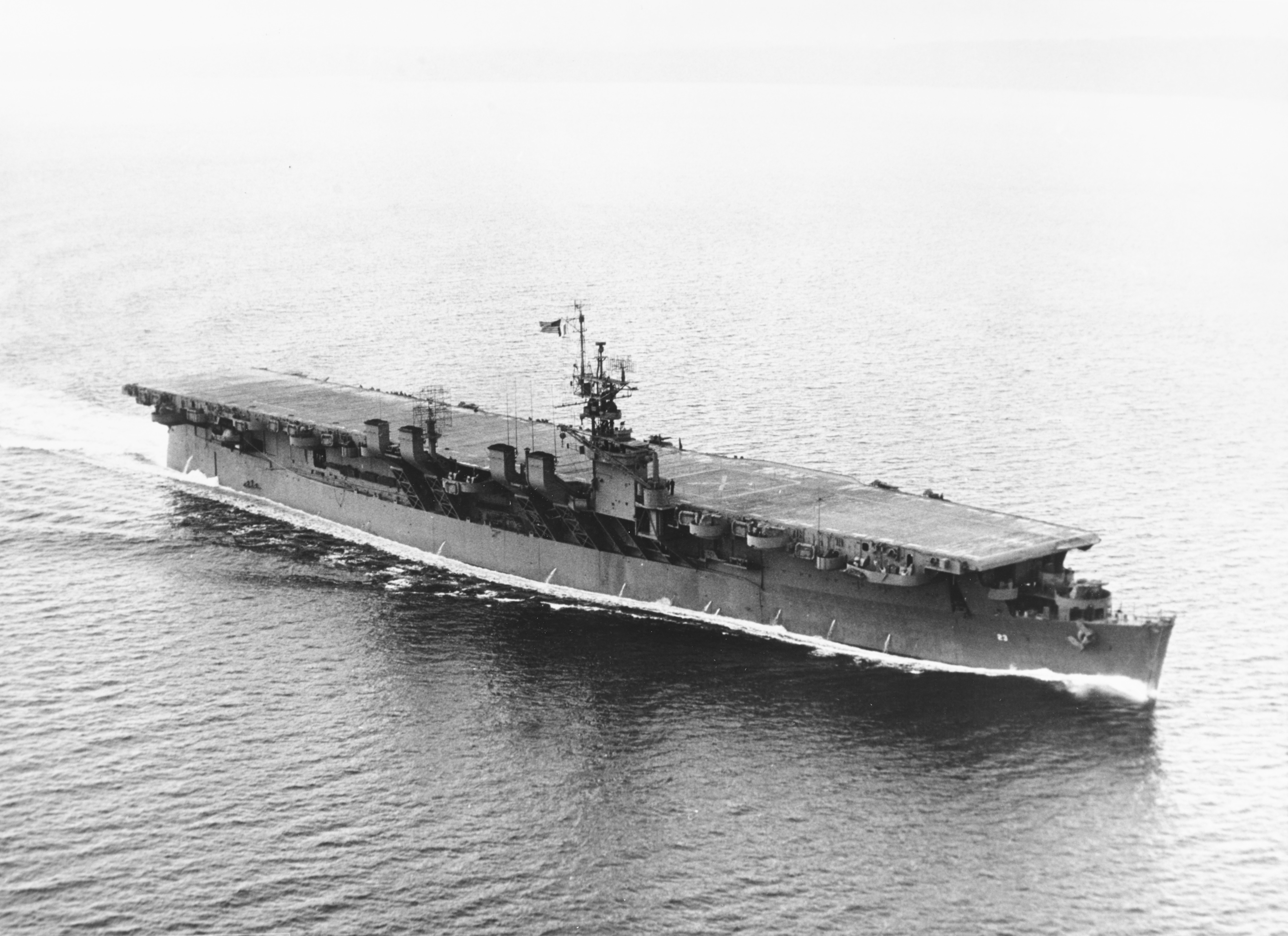
- USS Princeton off the coast of Seattle, Washington

History

United States
- Name: USS Princeton
- Namesake: Battle of Princeton
- Builder: New York Shipbuilding Corporation
- Laid down: 2 June 1941
- Launched: 18 October 1942
- Commissioned: 25 February 1943
- Stricken: 13 November 1944
- Fate: Scuttled after being severely damaged by Japanese air attack on 24 October 1944 in the Battle of Leyte Gulf

General characteristics
- Class & type: Independence-class aircraft carrier
- Displacement: 13,000 tons
- Length: 622.5 ft (189.7 m)
- Beam: 71.5 ft (21.8 m) (waterline); 109.2 ft (33.3 m) (extreme)
- Draft: 26 ft (7.9 m)
- Speed: 31 knots (57 km/h)
- Complement: 1,569 officers and men
- Armament: 22 × Bofors 40 mm guns; 16 × Oerlikon 20 mm cannons
- Aircraft carried: 45

The fourth USS Princeton (CVL-23) was a United States Navy Independence-class light aircraft carrier active in the Pacific Ocean during World War II. She was launched in 1942 and lost at the Battle of Leyte Gulf in 1944.

== Construction and deployment ==
The ship was laid down as the Cleveland-class light cruiser Tallahassee (CL-61) by the New York Shipbuilding Corporation, Camden, New Jersey, 2 June 1941. She was reclassified as the Independence-class light aircraft carrier CV-23 on 16 February 1942, renamed Princeton 31 March 1942, launched 18 October 1942, sponsored by Margaret Dodds (wife of Princeton University president Harold Dodds), and commissioned at Philadelphia 25 February 1943, Capt. George R. Henderson in command.

Following shakedown in the Caribbean, and reclassification to CVL-23 on 15 July 1943, Princeton, with Air Group 23 embarked, got underway for the Pacific. Arriving at Pearl Harbor 9 August, she sortied with TF 11 on 25 August and headed for Baker Island. There she served as flagship, TG 11.2 and provided air cover during the occupation of the island and the construction of an airfield there, 1–14 September. During that time her planes downed Japanese Emily reconnaissance planes and, more importantly, furnished the fleet with photographs of them.

Completing that mission, Princeton rendezvoused with TF 15, conducted strikes against enemy installations on Makin and Tarawa, then headed back to Pearl Harbor. In mid-October, she sailed for Espiritu Santo where she joined USS Saratoga to form TF 38 on 20 October. With that force, she sent her planes against airfields at Buka and Bonis on Bougainville (1–2 November) to diminish Japanese aerial resistance during the landings at Empress Augusta Bay. On 5 and 11 November her planes along with those from Saratoga undertook a risky air raid to neutralize a squadron of Japanese heavy cruisers while raiding Rabaul and on the 19th, with TF 50, helped neutralize the airfield at Nauru. Princeton then steamed northeast, covered the garrison groups en route to Makin and Tarawa and, after exchanging operational aircraft for damaged planes from other carriers, got underway for Pearl Harbor and the west coast.

On 3 January 1944, Princeton steamed west again for Pearl Harbor, where she rejoined the fast carriers of TF 50, now designated TF 58. On 19 January, she sortied with TG 58.4 for strikes at Wotje and Taroa (29–31 January) to support amphibious operations against Kwajalein and Majuro. Her planes photographed the next assault target, Eniwetok, 2 February and on 3 February returned on a more destructive assignment – the demolition of the airfield on Engebi. For three days the atoll was bombed and strafed. On 7 February, Princeton retired to Kwajalein, and the same day William H. Buracker took command. Princeton returned to Eniwetok on 10–13 and 16–28 February, when her planes softened the beaches for the invasion force, then provided air cover during the assault and ensuing fight.

From Eniwetok, Princeton retired to Majuro, thence to Espiritu Santo for replenishment. On 23 March, she got underway for strikes against enemy installation and shipping in the Carolines. After striking the Palaus, Woleai and Yap, the force replenished at Majuro and sortied again 13 April. Steaming to New Guinea, the carriers provided air cover for the Hollandia operation (21–29 April), then crossed back over the International Date Line to raid Truk (29–30 April) and Ponape (1 May).

On 11 May, Princeton returned to Pearl Harbor only to depart again on 29 May for Majuro. There she rejoined the fast carriers and pointed her bow toward the Marianas to support the assault on Saipan. From 11 to 18 June, she sent her planes against targets on Guam, Rota, Tinian, Pagan, and Saipan, then steamed west to intercept a Japanese fleet reported to be en route from the Philippines to the Marianas. In the ensuing Battle of the Philippine Sea, Princeton's planes contributed 30 kills and her guns another three, plus one assist, to the devastating toll inflicted on Japan's naval air arm.

Returning to the Marianas, Princeton again struck Pagan, Rota and Guam, then replenished at Eniwetok. On 14 July, she got underway again as the fast carriers returned their squadrons to the Marianas to furnish air cover for the assault and occupation of Guam and Tinian. On 2 August, the force returned to Eniwetok, replenished, then sailed for the Philippines. En route, her planes raided the Palaus, then on 9–10 September, struck airfields on northern Mindanao. On 11 September, they pounded the Visayas. At mid-month the force moved back over the Pacific chessboard to support the Palau offensive, then returned to the Philippines to hit Luzon, concentrating on Clark and Nichols fields. The force then retired to Ulithi, and in early October, bombed and strafed enemy airfields, installations and shipping in the Nansei Shoto and Formosa area in preparation for the invasion of the Philippines.

== Loss ==
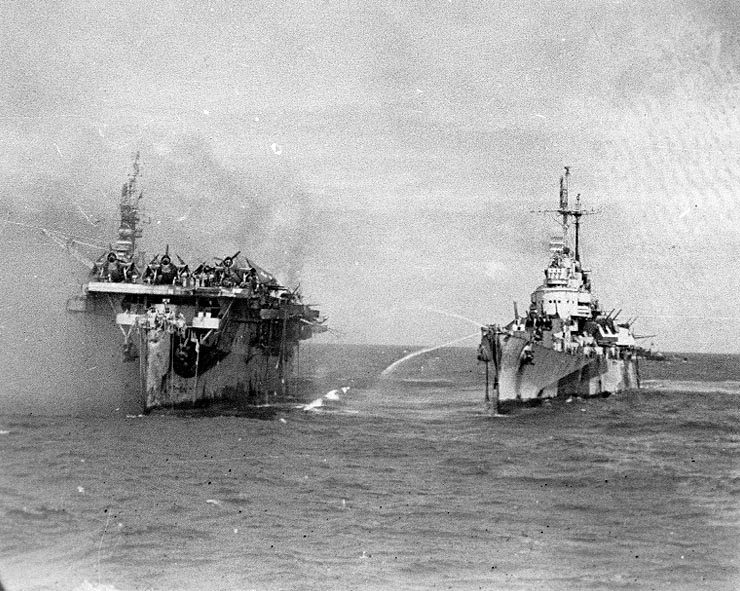
Birmingham attempts to fight fires aboard Princeton

On 20 October, landings were made at Dulag and San Pedro Bay, Leyte. Princeton, in Task Group 38.3, cruised off Luzon and sent her planes against airfields there to prevent Japanese land-based aircraft attacks on Allied ships massed in Leyte Gulf.

On 24 October, however, the task group was found by enemy planes from Clark and Nichols fields. Shortly before 10:00 a.m. Princeton was attacked by a lone Yokosuka D4Y 'Judy'. The dive bomber dropped a single bomb, which struck the carrier between the elevators, punching through the wooden flight deck and hangar before exploding. Although structural damage was minor, a fire broke out and quickly spread owing to burning gasoline, causing further explosions.

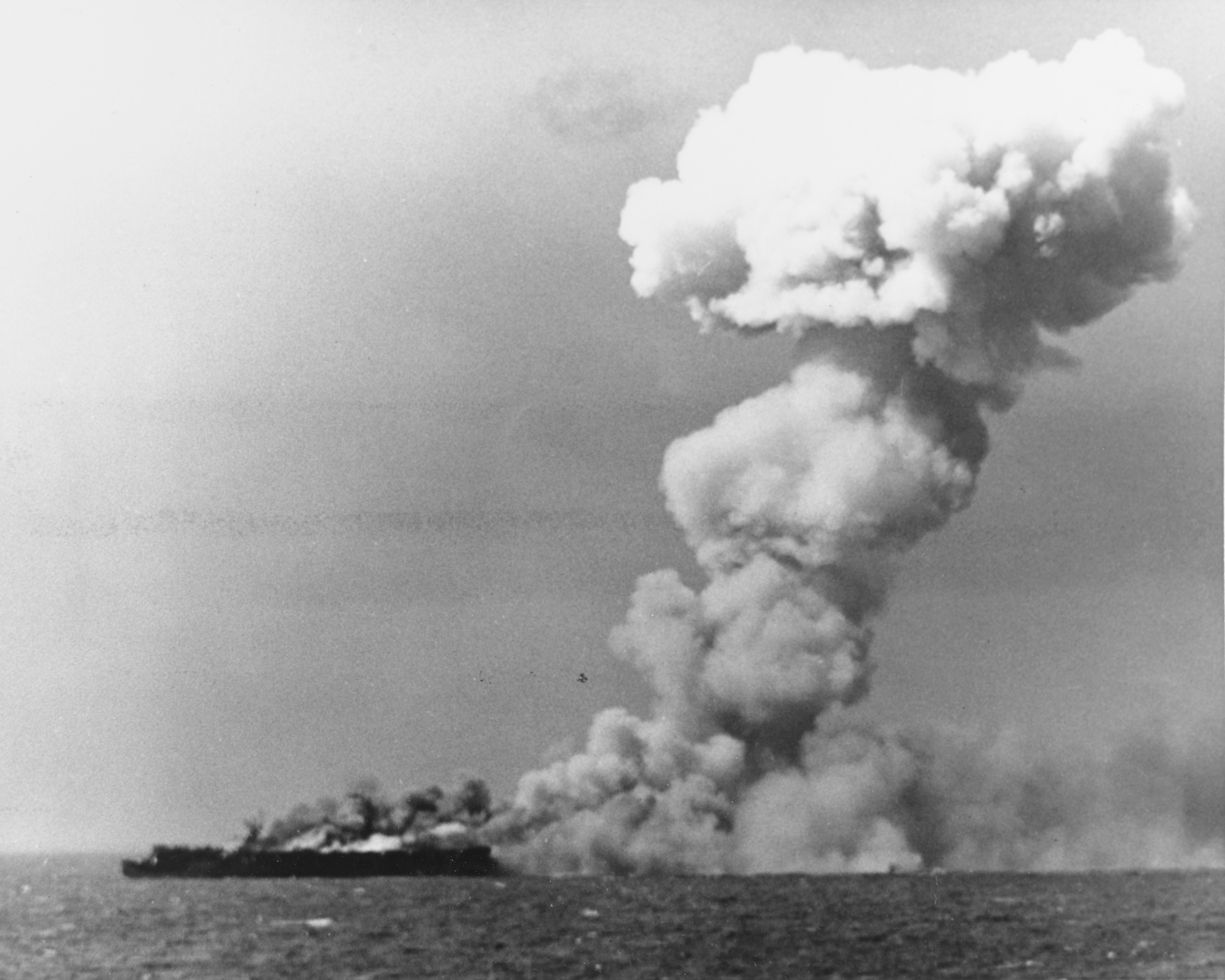
USS Princeton on fire east of Luzon, 24 October 1944

Cruisers and destroyers came alongside to render assistance. USS Irwin approached and attempted to fight the fire in the forward section of the hangar deck. The cruiser USS Birmingham, being the largest ship, took the lead role in fire fighting. During the operation, Princeton collided with and damaged the assisting ships.

At 15:24, a second and larger explosion shook the Princeton, possibly caused by an explosion of one or more bombs in the magazine. Birmingham suffered extensive damage to her superstructure and considerable casualties. Irwin was also damaged, but stayed close and launched boats to rescue survivors from the sea. Irwin rescued 646 crewmen from the Princeton; the ship later received a Navy Unit Commendation award for her actions.

Efforts to save the carrier continued, but by 16:00, the fires were out of control. The remaining personnel were evacuated, and shortly after 17:06, Irwin commenced firing torpedoes at the burning hulk. However, Irwin abandoned this effort due to torpedo malfunctions (her torpedo tubes possibly damaged in the collision with Princeton) that caused her torpedoes to circle back and almost hit her. USS Reno, at 17:46, took over the task of scuttling Princeton. Three minutes later, an even larger explosion occurred on Princeton, destroying the entire forward section and sending flames and debris up to 1,000–2,000 feet (300–600 m) into the air. Princeton sank at approximately 17:50.

=== Aftermath ===
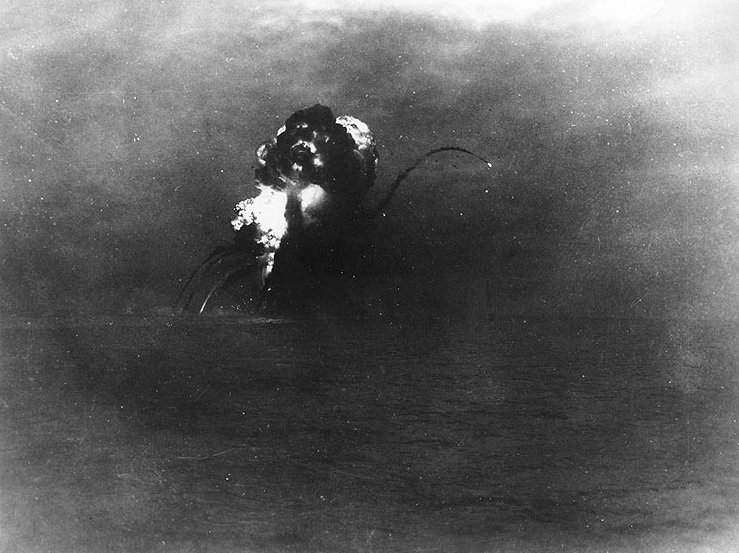
USS Princeton explodes after being torpedoed by USS Reno

Casualties on Princeton herself were relatively light considering the intensity of her fires; 108 men (10 officers and 98 enlisted men) were lost, while 1,361 crewmen were rescued. Princeton's Captain Buracker was later awarded the Purple Heart, Legion of Merit with the Combat "V", and the Navy Cross for his actions during the sinking.

Casualties were much heavier aboard Birmingham which was devastated by secondary explosions aboard Princeton while fighting fires, with 241 killed and 412 wounded. Three other ships were more lightly damaged while assisting Princeton:

- Birmingham: heavy topside damage, two 5 in., two 40 mm and two 20 mm guns lost.
- Morrison: foremast lost, portside smashed
- Irwin: forward 5 in. mounts and director out, starboard side smashed.
- Reno: one 40 mm smashed.

Captain John M. Hoskins, who had been prospective commanding officer of CVL-23, was also rescued, but lost his right foot. He would later become the new commanding officer of the fifth Princeton, launched as a replacement in 1945.

Birmingham's commanding officer Thomas Inglis said "I should take the same action – providing the same factors were involved and I had no crystal ball." By the end of 1945, he had been promoted to rear admiral and chief of Naval Intelligence. Birmingham earned a Navy Unit Commendation for her performance on 24 October 1944. According to a second hand account told by a Birmingham survivor, when the cruiser returned to port for repairs, the civilian workers brought in to clean up the ship before repairs allegedly refused to do the job due to the stench of rotting flesh, so naval enlisted men took over the job.

Lt. Robert G. Bradley was posthumously awarded the Navy Cross for his actions on Princeton on 24 October 1944. He was later the namesake of USS Robert G. Bradley (FFG-49). Princeton's executive officer Cdr. Joseph Nathaniel Murphy who assumed command was later awarded the Navy Cross for his tireless effort to save the ship and get the crew to safety.

== Legacy ==
Princeton earned nine battle stars during World War II.

In November 2004, the Princeton University Chapel rededicated a service flag that once flew on Princeton.

== See also ==
- List of aircraft carriers
- List of aircraft carriers of the United States Navy
- List of U.S. Navy losses in World War II for other ships lost in World War II.
