= USS Saipan (CVL-48) =

Saipan-class light aircraft carrier of the US Navy

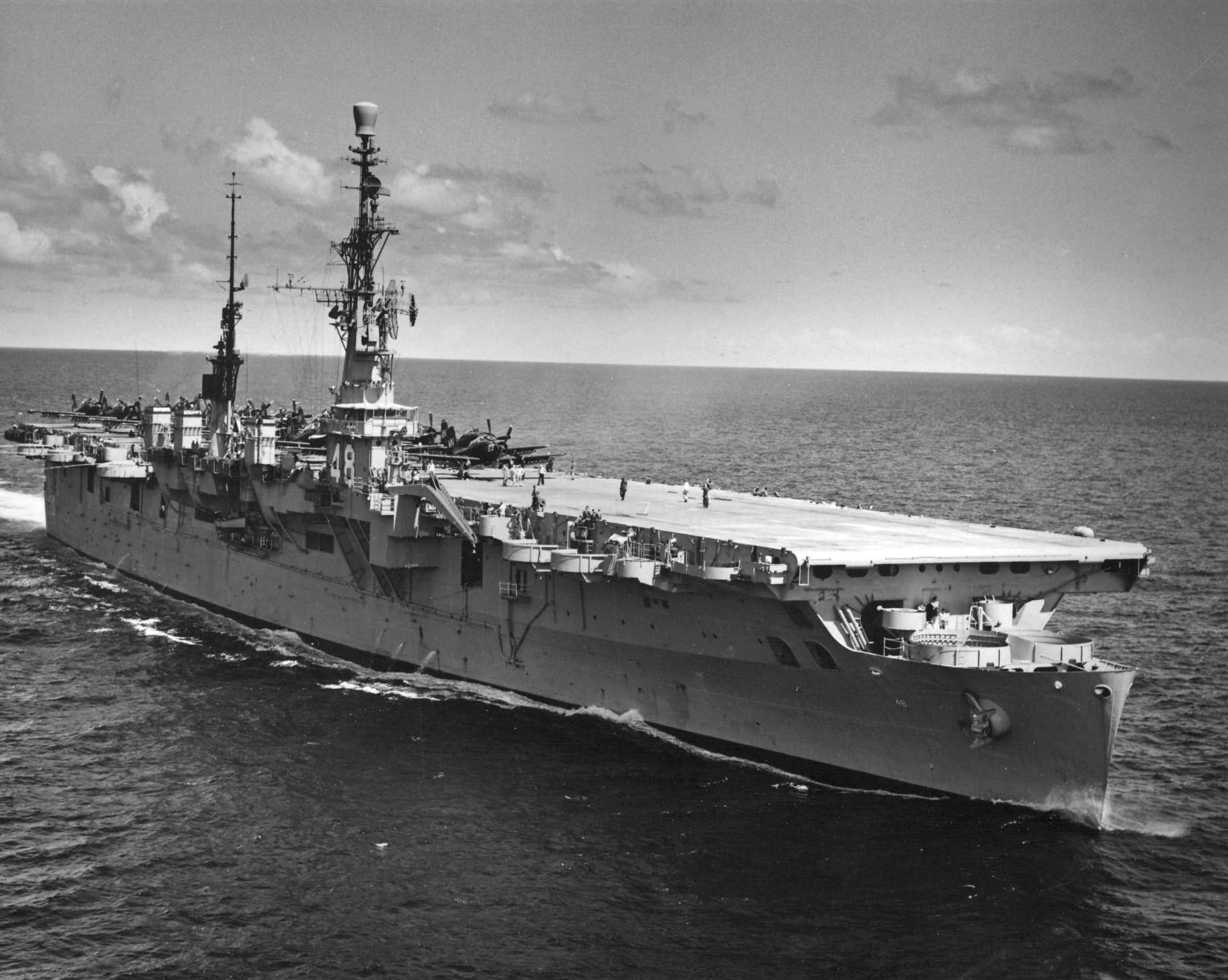
- USS Saipan underway, c. 1956

History

United States
- Name: Saipan (1944-1965); Arlington (1965-1970)
- Namesake: Battle of Saipan; Arlington County, VA (as USS Arlington)
- Builder: New York Shipbuilding Corporation
- Laid down: 10 July 1944
- Launched: 8 July 1945
- Commissioned: 14 July 1946
- Decommissioned: 3 October 1957
- Recommissioned: 27 August 1966
- Decommissioned: 14 January 1970
- Renamed: Arlington, 8 April 1965
- Reclassified: AVT-6, 15 May 1959; CC-3, 1963; AGMR-2, 1 September 1964
- Stricken: 15 August 1975
- Fate: Scrapped, 1 June 1976
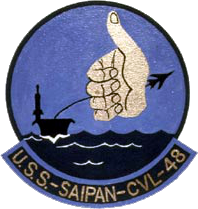
- Badge

General characteristics
- Class & type: Saipan-class aircraft carrier
- Displacement: 14,500 long tons (14,700 t)
- Length: 684 ft (208 m)
- Beam: 76 ft 9 in (23.39 m) (waterline); 115 ft (35 m) (extreme width)
- Draft: 28 ft (8.5 m)
- Installed power: 120,000 shp (89,000 kW)
- Propulsion: 4 × geared steam turbines; 4 × shafts
- Speed: 33 knots (61 km/h; 38 mph)
- Capacity: 2,400 long tons (2,400 t) oil fuel
- Complement: 1,721 officers and men
- Armament: 40 × Bofors 40 mm guns
- Aircraft carried: 50+ aircraft

The first USS Saipan (CVL-48/AVT-6/CC-3/AGMR-2) was a light aircraft carrier of the United States Navy. She was the lead ship of her class. She was later selected for conversion into a command ship in 1963–1964, but instead was converted to the Major Communications Relay Ship Arlington (AGMR-2) in 1965.

== Construction ==
With a hull design based on that of Baltimore-class heavy cruisers, Saipan was laid down on 10 July 1944, by the New York Shipbuilding Corporation, Camden, New Jersey, launched on 8 July 1945, sponsored by Mrs. John W. McCormack, and commissioned on 14 July 1946, with Captain John G. Crommelin in command.

== Service history ==
=== Commissioned ===
Commissioned 11 months after the close of World War II, Saipan trained student pilots out of Pensacola, Florida, from September 1946 to April 1947, when, reassigned to Norfolk, Virginia, as homeport, she departed the Gulf of Mexico; participated in exercises in the Caribbean; then proceeded to the Philadelphia, for overhaul. In November, she returned to Pensacola; but, in late December, after training midshipmen, steamed back to the east coast to serve with the Operational Development Force (OPTEVFOR).

In February 1948, her work in jet operational techniques, carrier support tactics, and electronic instrument evaluation was interrupted briefly. From 7 to 24 February, she was engaged in transporting the United States delegation to the Venezuelan Presidential inauguration and back. On her return, she conducted local operations off the Virginia Capes, and in April, after a visit to Portsmouth, New Hampshire, she resumed work for the Operational Development Force. On 18 April, she also relieved Mindoro as flagship of Carrier Division 17 (CarDiv 17).

=== Fighter Squadron 17A ===
On 19 April, she departed Norfolk, for Quonset Point, Rhode Island, where, on 3 May, she embarked Fighter Squadron 17A. Three days later, all squadron pilots had been qualified in FH-1 Phantom jets. The squadron became the first carrier-based jet squadron.

Back at Norfolk, by the end of the month, Saipan was relieved of flagship duties. In June, she returned to New England waters; and in July, she commenced overhaul at Norfolk. In December, she resumed local operations. On 24 December, she was ordered to embark two of the Navy's latest type helicopter, the XHJS-1, and three Marine Corps HRP-1 helicopters and proceeded north to Greenland to assist in the rescue of eleven airmen downed on the ice cap. Departing Norfolk, on Christmas Day, she arrived off Cape Farewell, on 28 December, and prepared to launch the helicopters as soon as weather allowed. On 29 December, a C-47, equipped with jet assist takeoff and skis, landed on the ice and recovered the marooned airmen.

=== 1949-1954 ===
Saipan then returned to Norfolk, where she arrived on 31 December. On 28 January 1949, she steamed south, conducting exercises out of Guantanamo Bay into March, and returned to Hampton Roads, on 10 March. From 11 to 19 March, she conducted operations for the development force; then made a reserve training cruise to Canada. At the end of May, she again commenced work for OPTEVFOR. Three months later, she conducted her second reservist cruise of the year, then qualified Royal Canadian Navy pilots in carrier landings.

From November 1949 to March 1951, Saipan remained on the east coast, operating from the Virginia Capes south. On 6 March 1951, she got underway as flagship, CarDiv 14, and sailed for duty with the Sixth Fleet. Deployed for three months, she sailed the waters of the western Mediterranean, until the end of May, then headed for home. On 8 June, she was back at Norfolk, and resumed operations in the western Atlantic from Greenland to the Caribbean.

For over two years, Saipan continued Second Fleet operations, interrupting them for midshipman cruises during the summers of 1952 and 1953, and for an overhaul. In October 1953, she departed the east coast and steamed for the Panama Canal and the Pacific. On 30 October, she arrived at San Diego, California, then continued on to Pearl Harbor, Hawaii, and Yokosuka, Japan, and duty off the coast of Korea, in support of the uneasy truce agreement.

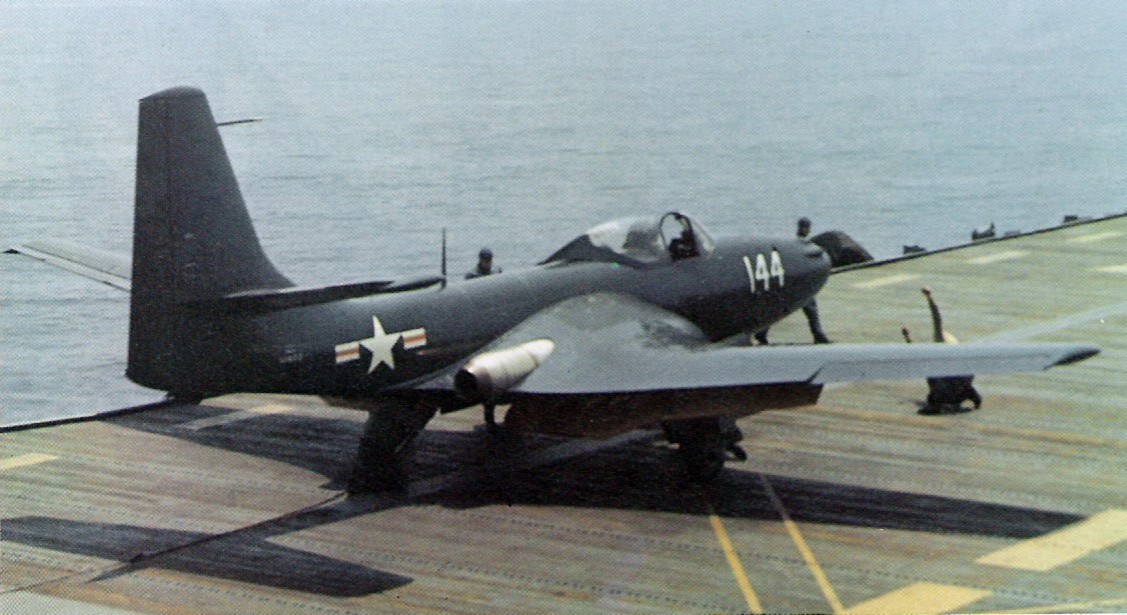
FH-1 Phantom of VF-17A on Saipan, May 1948.

Assigned to TF 95, Saipan was primarily engaged in surveillance and reconnaissance missions along the coast and in inspection patrols of the islands just south of the 38th parallel. In January 1954, she interrupted her patrols to provide air support for Japanese manned LSTs ferrying former Chinese POWs from Inchon, to new homes on Taiwan. In early February, she participated in amphibious exercises in the Ryukyus, then returned to Inchon to stand by in the event she was needed for an evacuation of Indian troops from Panmunjom. In March, amphibious exercises took her to the Bonins. She then returned to Japan, but instead of resuming truce patrols, she took on 25 AU-variant Corsairs and 5 H-19A helicopters at Yokosuka, and steamed south. On 18 April, VMA-324 pilots flew the AUs off her flight deck and landed them at Tourane, now Danang, Air Base, to support the French Aéronavale fighting at the battle of Dien Bien Phu in the latest days of the First Indochina War. There the aircraft were turned over to French forces. Later in the day, Saipan entered the harbor, offloaded spare parts and maintenance personnel, and departed for Manila.

On 20 April, she delivered the helicopters to Air Force personnel in the Philippines; and at the end of the month, she resumed operations off the coast of Korea. On 8 May, Saipan put into Sasebo, Japan, and through 24 May, remained in Japanese waters. On 25 May, she got underway to return to Norfolk, via the Suez Canal. On 20 July, she completed her round the world cruise.

==== Hurricane Hazel ====
In October, Saipan again sailed south to the Caribbean. Arriving as Hurricane Hazel hit the Greater Antilles, razing areas of Hispaniola, the carrier was immediately assigned to relief work. From 13 to 20 October 1954, she delivered food and medical supplies and personnel to isolated areas of Haiti; then, after being honored by the Haitian government, she returned to Norfolk. On 1 November, she entered the shipyard there for overhaul, and in April, resumed operations with a cruise to the Caribbean. In June, she was again attached to the aviation training center at Pensacola; and through the summer, conducted qualification exercises. At the end of September, she was ordered to Mexico, to again assist in hurricane relief work. From 1 to 9 October, her helicopters evacuated survivors, flew in rescue personnel, and distributed food, water and medical supplies, primarily in the flooded Tampico area. On 12 October, she returned to Pensacola, where she remained until April 1957. Between her two training stints from 1946 to 1947 and 1955 to 1957, carrier pilots were trained on Wright, Cabot and Monterey. On the first of that month, she sailed for Bayonne, New Jersey, where she began inactivation and was decommissioned on 3 October 1957.

=== Conversion ===
Reclassified AVT-6, aircraft transport, on 15 May 1959, Saipan remained in the Atlantic Reserve Fleet until March 1963. She then entered the Alabama Drydock and Shipbuilding Company yard at Mobile, Alabama, to begin conversion to a command ship. Very briefly designated CC-3, she was instead reclassified as Major Communications Relay Ship AGMR-2, major communications relay ship, on 1 September 1964, while still undergoing conversion. On 8 April 1965, she was renamed Arlington, in honor of Arlington County, Virginia, the site of one of the Navy's first radio stations; and on 12 August 1966, she completed her conversion. As Arlington, she sailed for Norfolk, where she was recommissioned on 27 August 1966.

Fitting out occupied the remainder of the year. In January 1967, she conducted shakedown exercises in the Caribbean, and in February, she sailed for the Bay of Biscay, and exercises off northern Europe. At the end of March, she returned to Norfolk, and in April, she again steamed to the Caribbean. On her return to the Hampton Roads, she prepared for deployment to the western Pacific.

=== Vietnam ===
Departing Norfolk, on 7 July 1967, the communications ship transited the Panama Canal, and proceeded on to Pearl Harbor, Yokosuka, and Subic Bay. Arlington joined Annapolis, and rotated on station off Vietnam. During her first patrol in the Tonkin Gulf, from 21 August to 18 September 1967, she provided reliable message handling facilities for ships of the 7th Fleet in support of combat operations; and in addition, assisted ships in repairing and better utilizing their electronic equipment. On returning to the Philippines, after her first patrol, Arlington received a new satellite communications terminal; and on 2 October, she departed Subic for Taiwan.

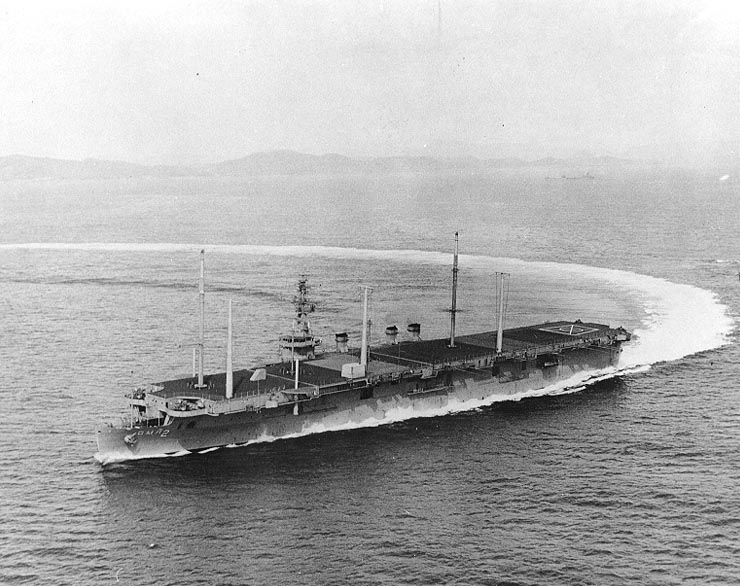
Arlington (AGMR-2), 1967.

Arlington spent three days in Taiwan, before continuing on to Tonkin Gulf, where she resumed her communications relay duties. At the end of the month she shifted south to provide communications support to ships in the "Market Time" area off South Vietnam. After 34 days on station, she spent five days in Hong Kong, then returned to Subic Bay, before steaming to Tonkin Gulf, in early December 1967, for her third "Yankee Station" communications patrol. On 27 December, she departed the area and headed north. On 4 January 1968, she arrived at Yokosuka, and on 19 January, she got underway to return to Vietnam.

Arriving back on "Yankee Station", on 24 January 1968, she departed again on 26 January, to participate in exercises in the Sea of Japan; then returned to "Yankee Station".

On station from 13 February to 10 March 1968, she returned to Yokosuka, on 14 March, remained until 3 April, and resumed operations in Tonkin Gulf, on 10 April. A visit to Sydney, followed completion of her April patrol; but by mid-June 1968, she was back on station. From 20 to 22 July, she again visited Hong Kong, then sailed for Yokosuka.

==== Manned Spacecraft Recovery Force ====
Between the end of August and mid-November 1968, she completed two more tours on "Yankee Station", and in early December, she got underway for Pearl Harbor. There at mid-month, she conducted communications tests; and on 18 December, she departed Hawaii in TF 130, the Manned Spacecraft Recovery Force, Pacific. Acting as primary landing area communications relay ship, she participated in the recovery of Apollo 8 and returned to Pearl Harbor, on 29 December 1968. Two days later, she sailed for the Philippines, and on 17 January 1969, she resumed direct communications support for naval units in Tonkin Gulf. On 6 February, she departed "Yankee Station", and after upkeep at Yokosuka, conducted operations off southern Japan, and in the Ryukyus. Toward the end of March, she sailed for Hong Kong, before she returned to Vietnam.

Remaining on station from 6 to 14 April 1969, she tested her Apollo communications equipment, and on 15 April, headed back to Pearl Harbor. On 2 May, she arrived in Hawaii. and once again joined TF 130. Arlington was again assigned as primary landing area communications relay ship and departed Pearl Harbor, on 11 May, and steamed for the Apollo 10 recovery area, some 2,400 miles south of Hawaii. On 26 May, the capsule was recovered and the assigned ships returned to Hawaii. From there, Arlington proceeded to Midway Atoll, where she provided communications support for the Nixon-Thiệu conference on 8 June 1969, and the next day, she sailed west.

On 27 June 1969, the communications ship returned to the Vietnamese coast. On 7 July, however, she was ordered east for her third Apollo recovery mission. Arriving in the recovery area on 21 July, she tested her equipment; and on the following day moved to Johnston Island. On 23 July, she embarked President Nixon, for an overnight visit; and on 24 July, supported the recovery of Apollo 11. Crew and capsule successfully recovered, Arlington headed for Hawaii, whence she steamed to the west coast.

=== Deactivation and decommissioning ===
On 21 August 1969, she arrived for the first time at her nominal homeport, Long Beach, and four days later shifted to San Diego, to begin inactivation. She was decommissioned on 14 January 1970, and berthed with the Inactive Fleet at San Diego.

The ship was stricken from the Navy List on 15 August 1975, and was sold by the Defense Reutilization and Marketing Service (DRMS) for scrapping on 1 June 1976.

== Awards ==
=== USS Saipan (CVL-48) ===
- World War II Victory Medal
- Navy Occupation Service Medal with "Europe" clasp
- National Defense Service Medal
- Korean War Service Medal
- United Nations Korea Medal
- Republic of Korea War Service Medal (retroactive)

=== USS Arlington (AGMR-2) ===
- Meritorious Unit Commendation with star (2 awards)
- National Defence Service Medal with star (2 awards)
- Armed Forces Expeditionary Medal
- Vietnam Service Medal with 7 campaign stars
- Republic of Vietnam Meritorious Unit Citation (Gallantry Cross Medal with Palm)
- Republic of Vietnam Campaign Medal

== Gallery ==
USS Saipan Lifecycle

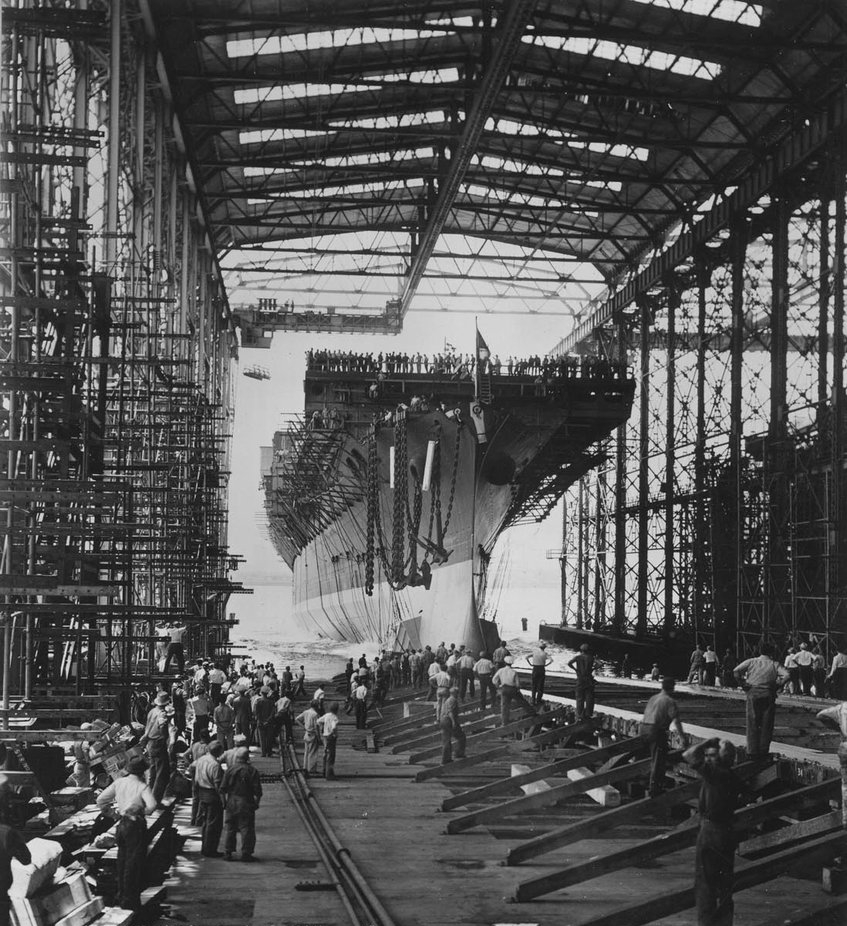
USS Saipan being launched at New York Shipbuilding Corporation on 8 July 1945.

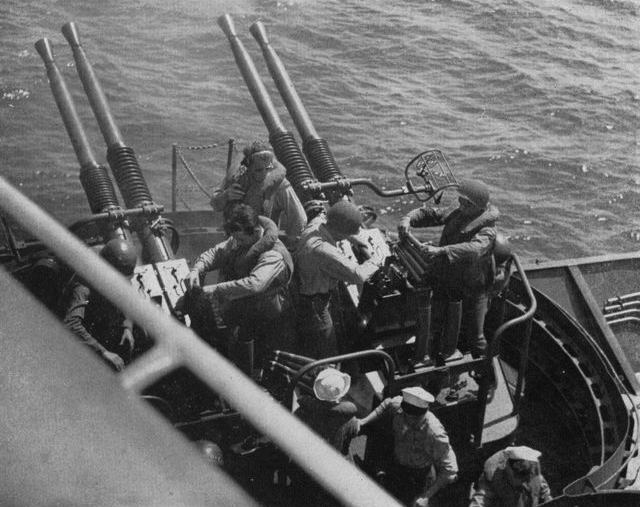
40mm quad gun mount firing aboard USS Saipan in c1946.

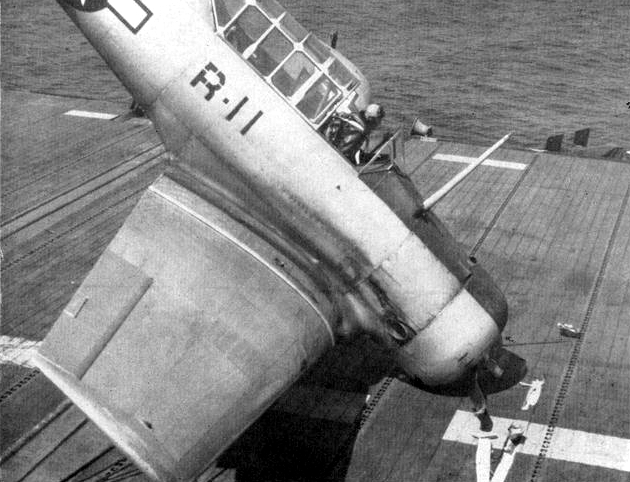
North American T-6 Texan crashed on USS Saipan in 1946.

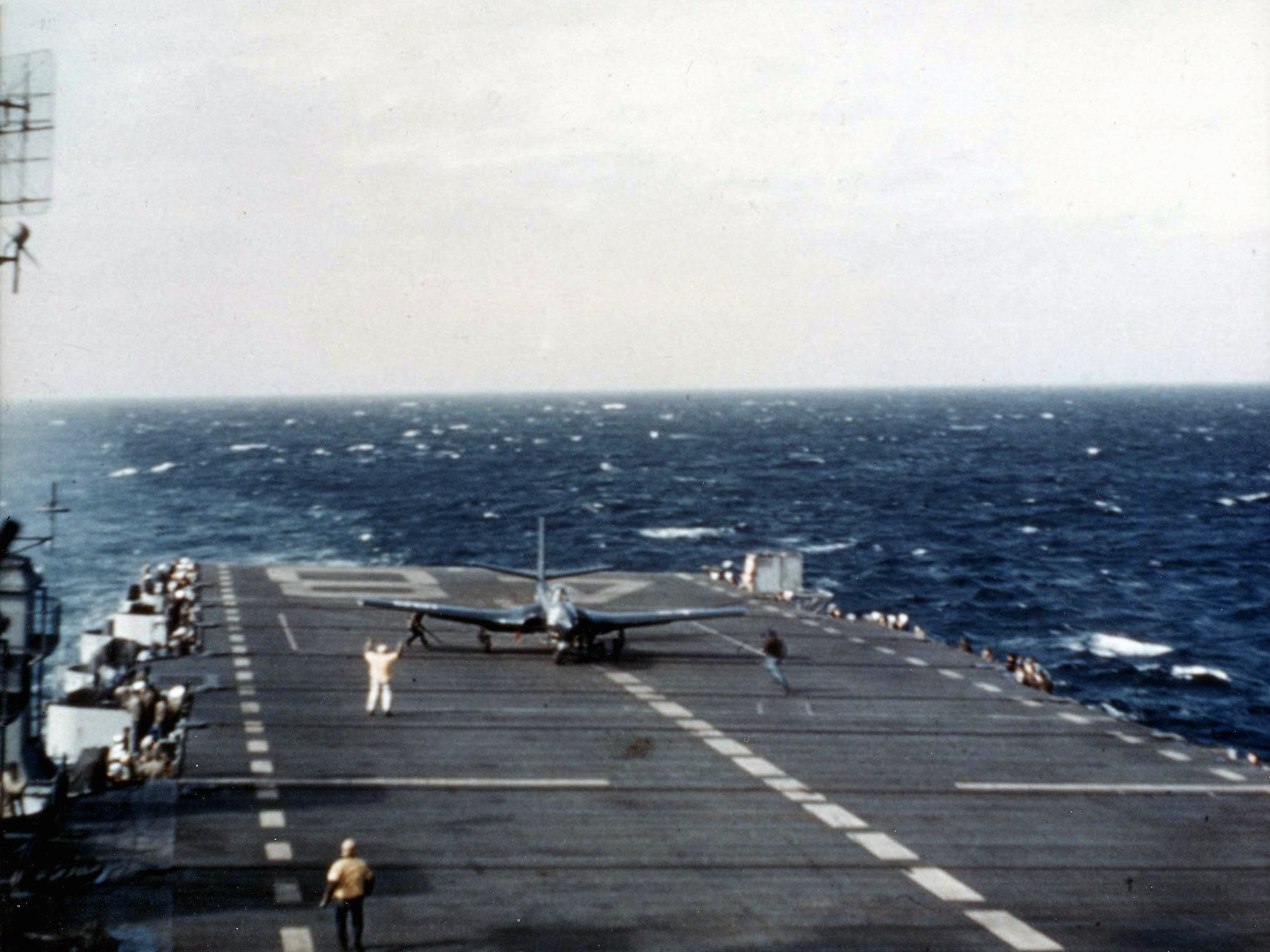
Navy FH-1 Phantom on USS Saipan in 1948.

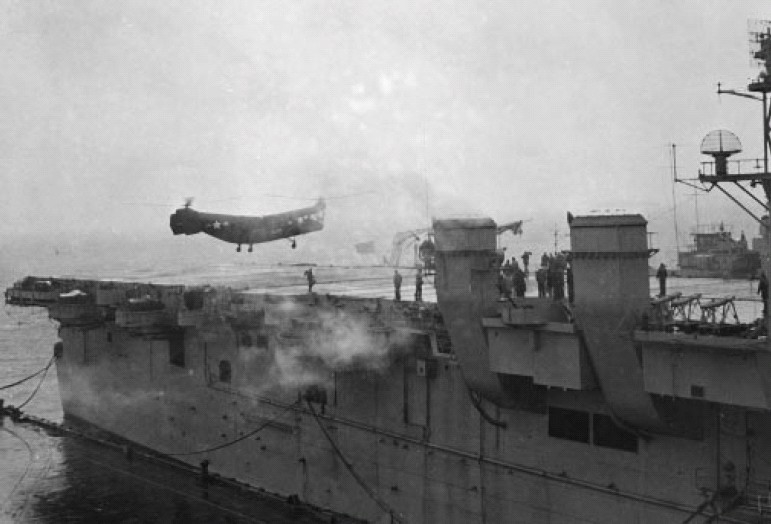
Piasecki HRP-1 landing on USS Saipan in 1948.

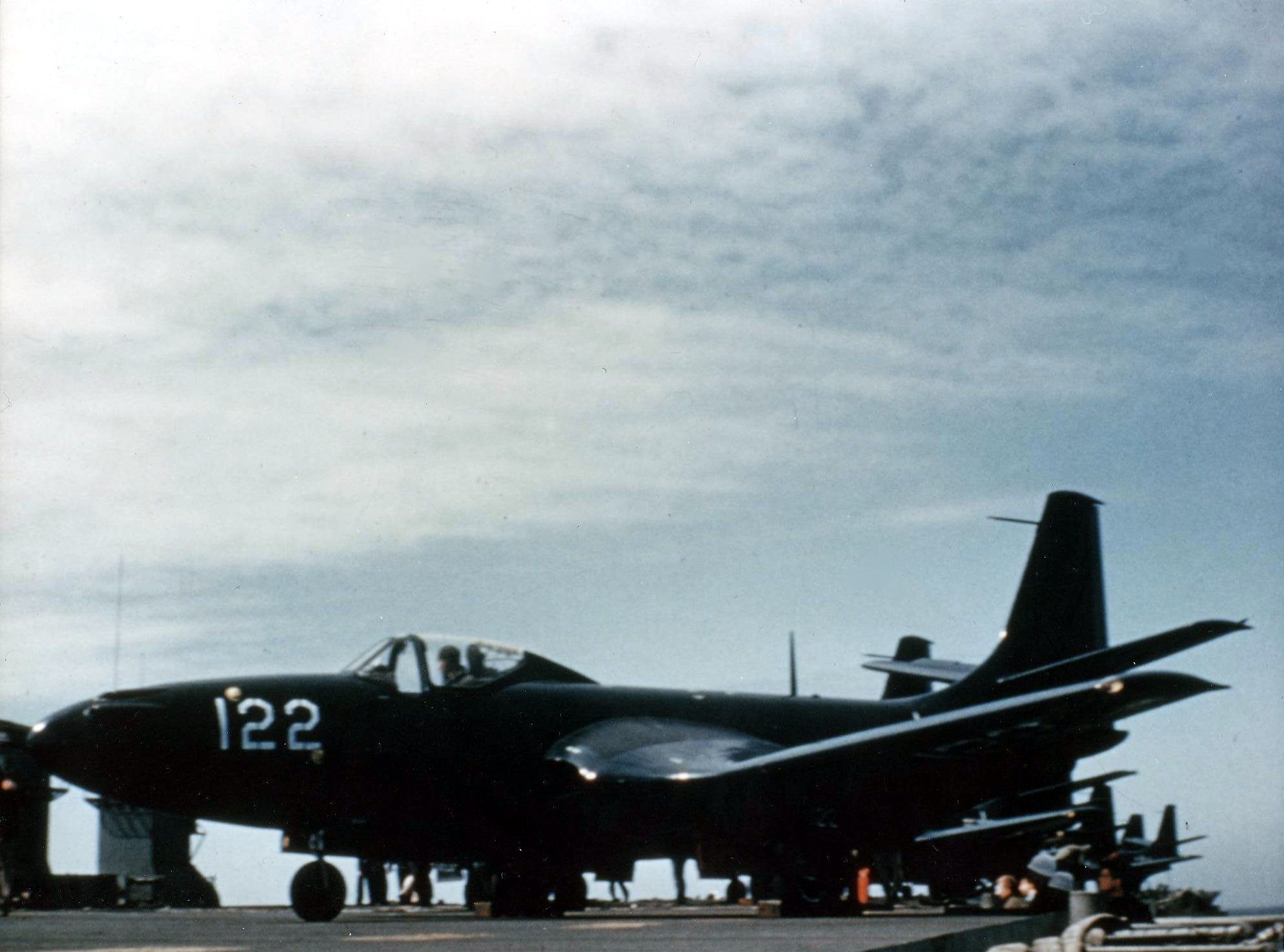
McDonnell FH-1 Phantom on USS Saipan in 1948.

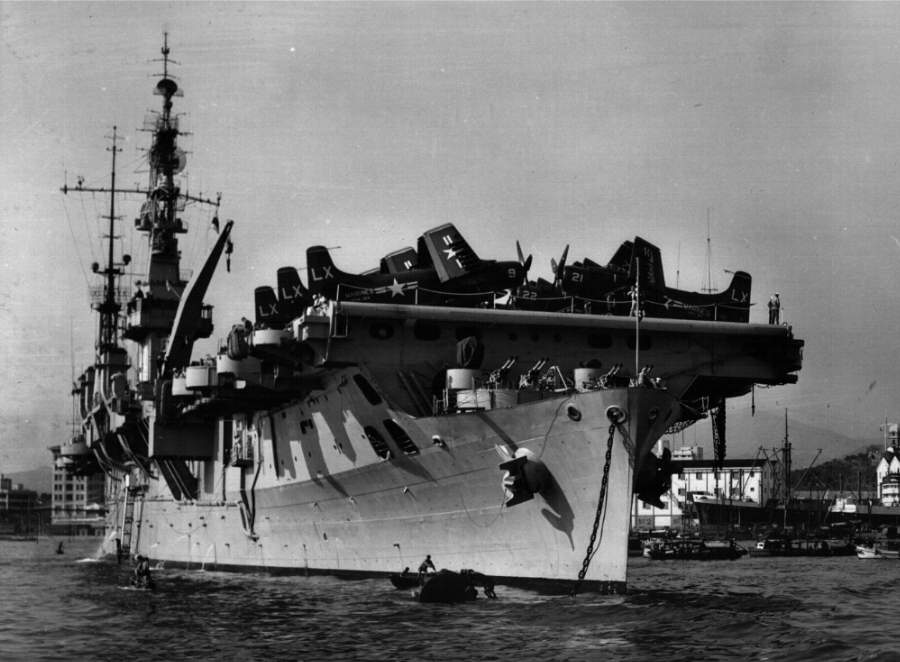
USS Saipan at Hong Kong in February 1954.

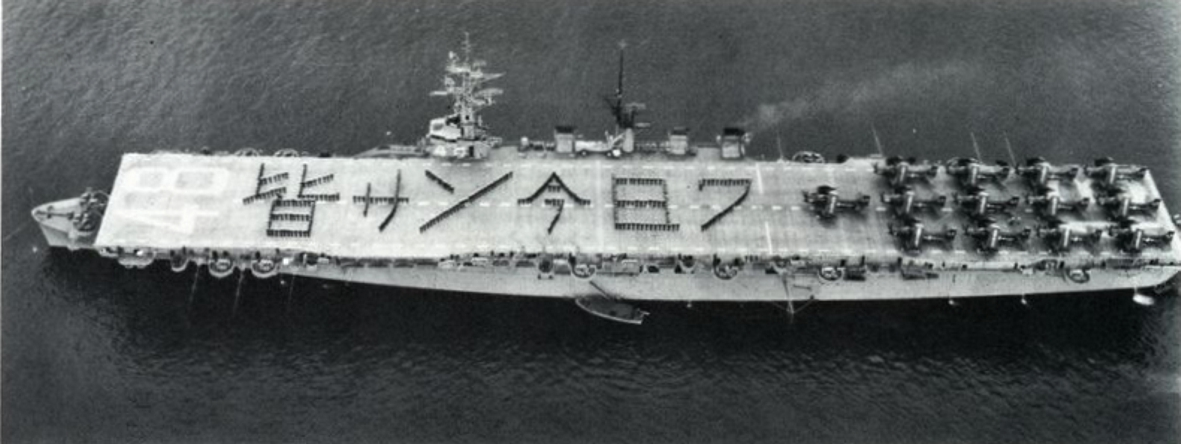
USS Saipan at Nagasaki, Japan, in May 1954.

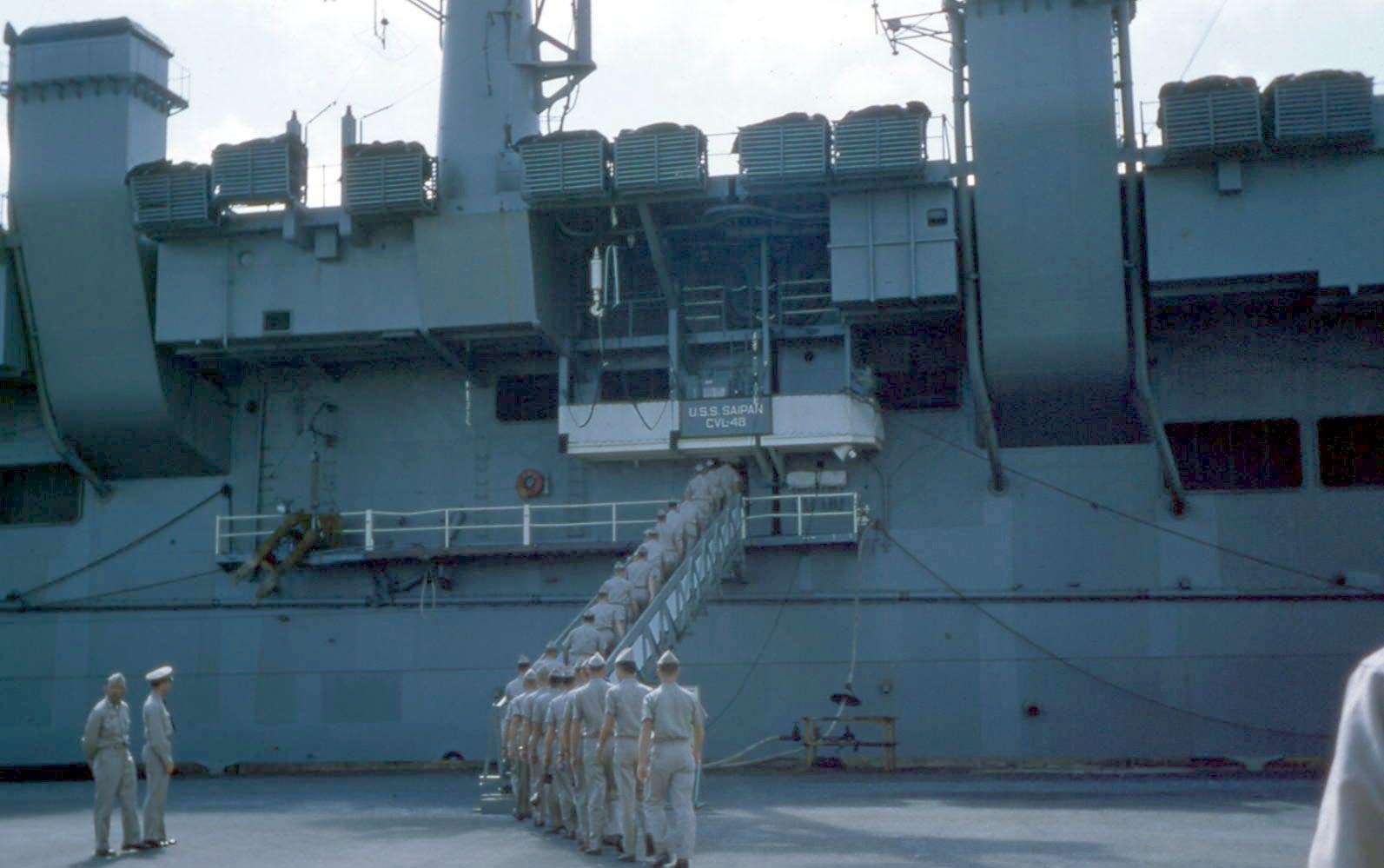
Cadets touring
USS Saipan, docked in Pensacola, Florida, 1956

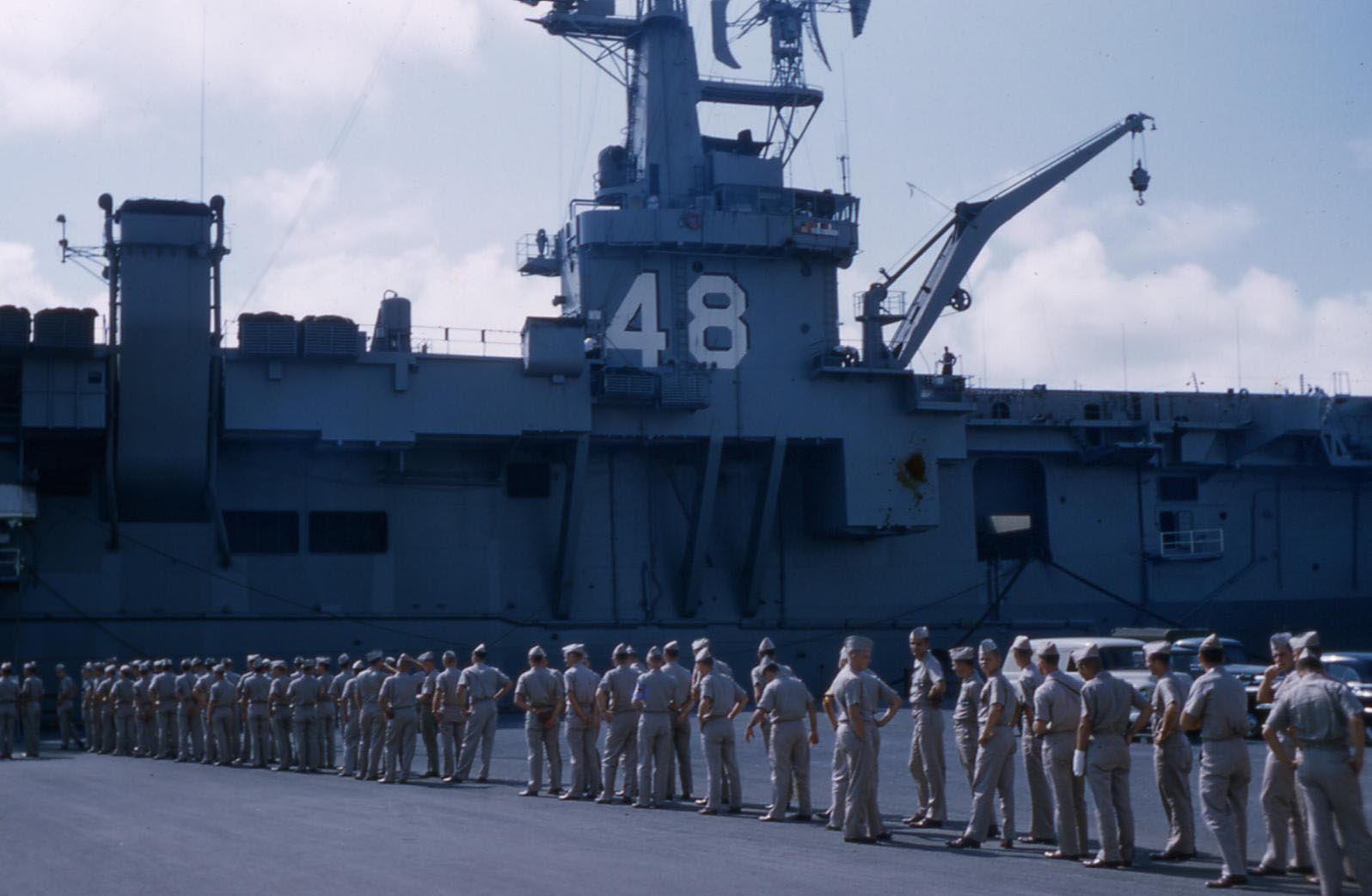
USS Saipan (CVL-48), 1956

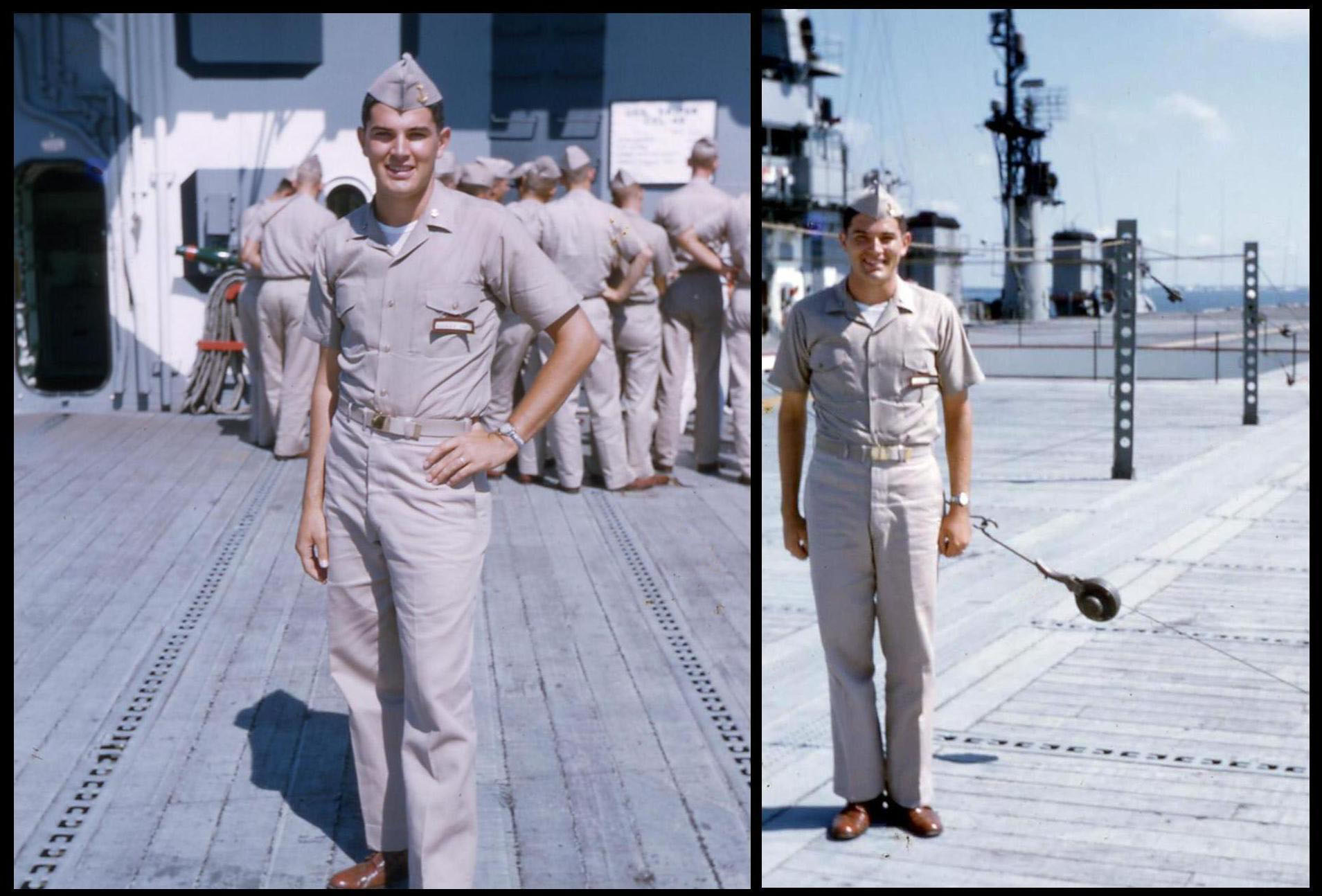
Aviation Officer Candidate in pre-flight training aboard ship, 1956

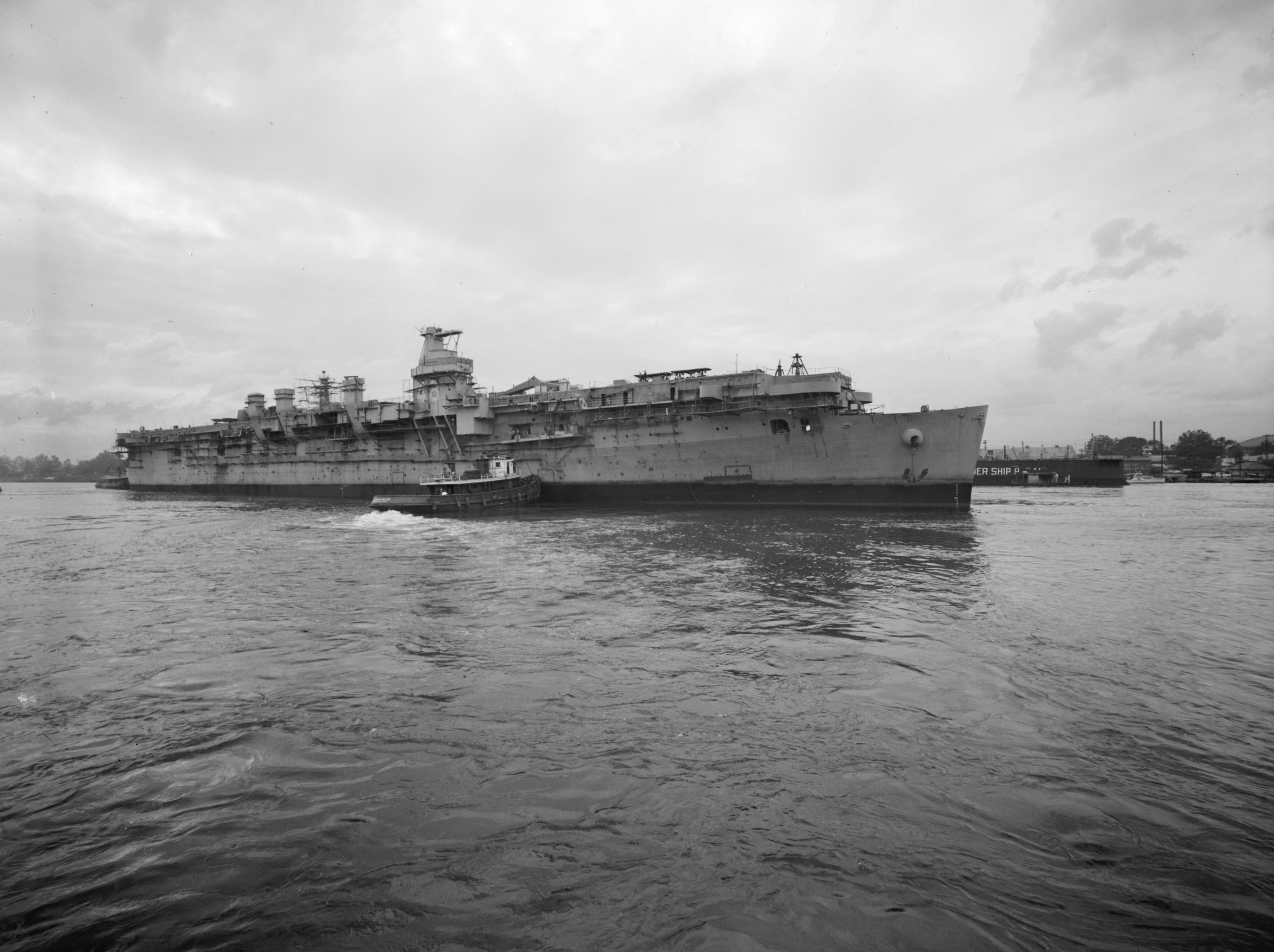
USS Saipan being reactivated for service in 1963.

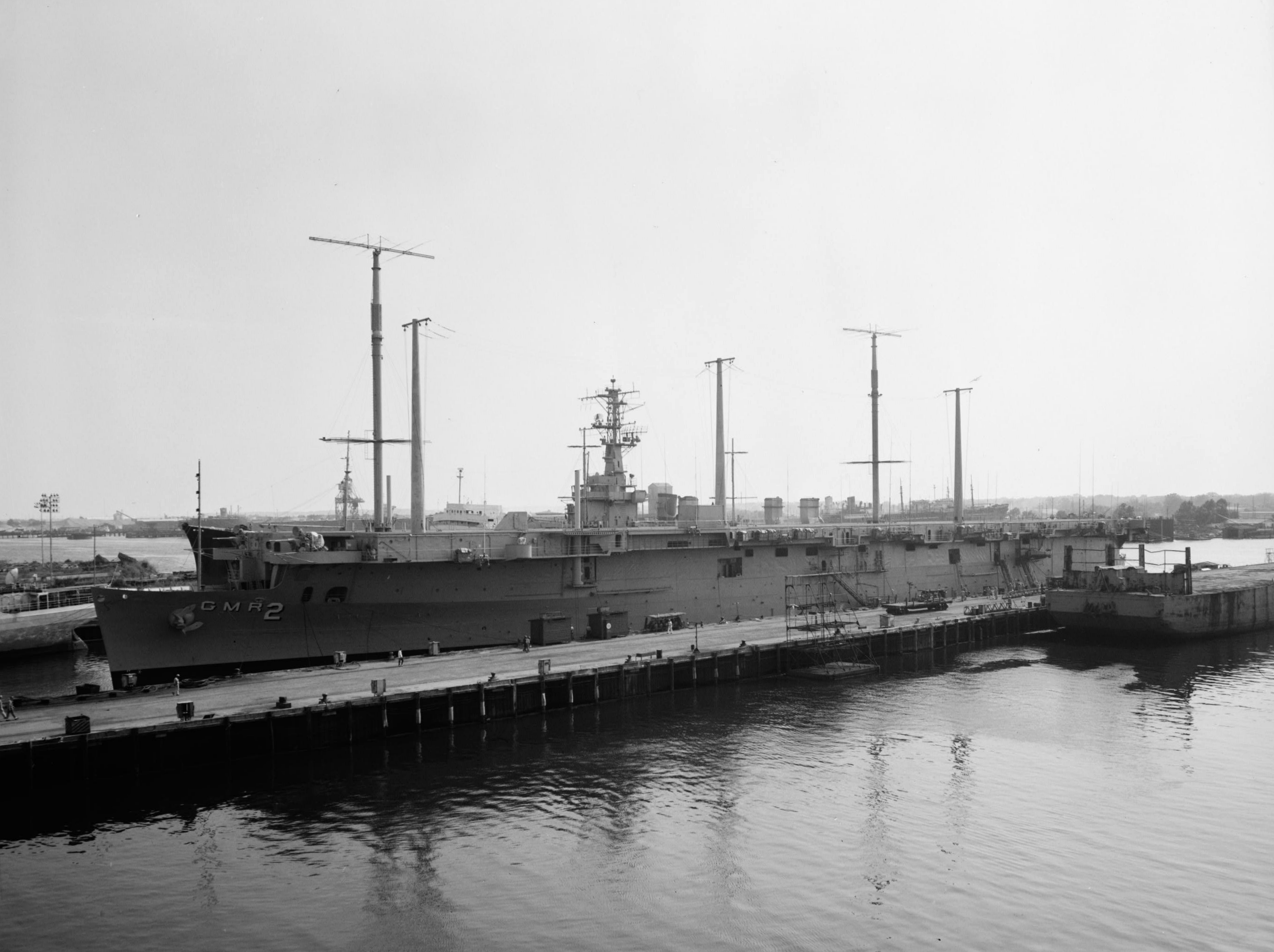
Ex-USS Saipan, USS Arlington (AGMR-2) in Port, c1966.

== See also ==
- List of aircraft carriers
- List of aircraft carriers of the United States Navy

== Bibliography ==
- "Saipan (CVL-48)". DANFS. Navy Department, Naval History and Heritage Command. 2 September 2015. This article incorporates text from this source, which is in the public domain.
