= Light aircraft carrier =

Type of warship

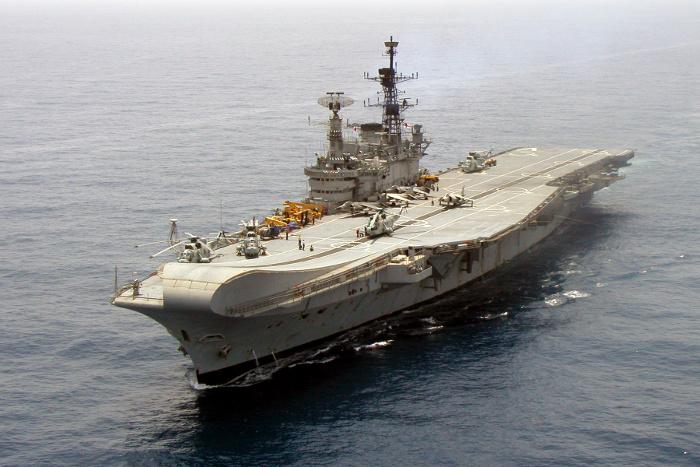
Indian Navy's INS Viraat. Many modern light aircraft carriers are equipped with ski jump ramps.

A light aircraft carrier, or light fleet carrier, is an aircraft carrier smaller than the standard carriers of a navy. The precise definition of the type varies by country; light carriers typically have a complement of aircraft only one-half to two-thirds the size of a full-sized fleet carrier. A light carrier was similar in concept to an escort carrier in most respects; however, light carriers were intended for higher speeds to be deployed alongside fleet carriers, while escort carriers were typically relatively slow and usually defended equally slow convoys, as well as providing air support during amphibious operations.

== History ==
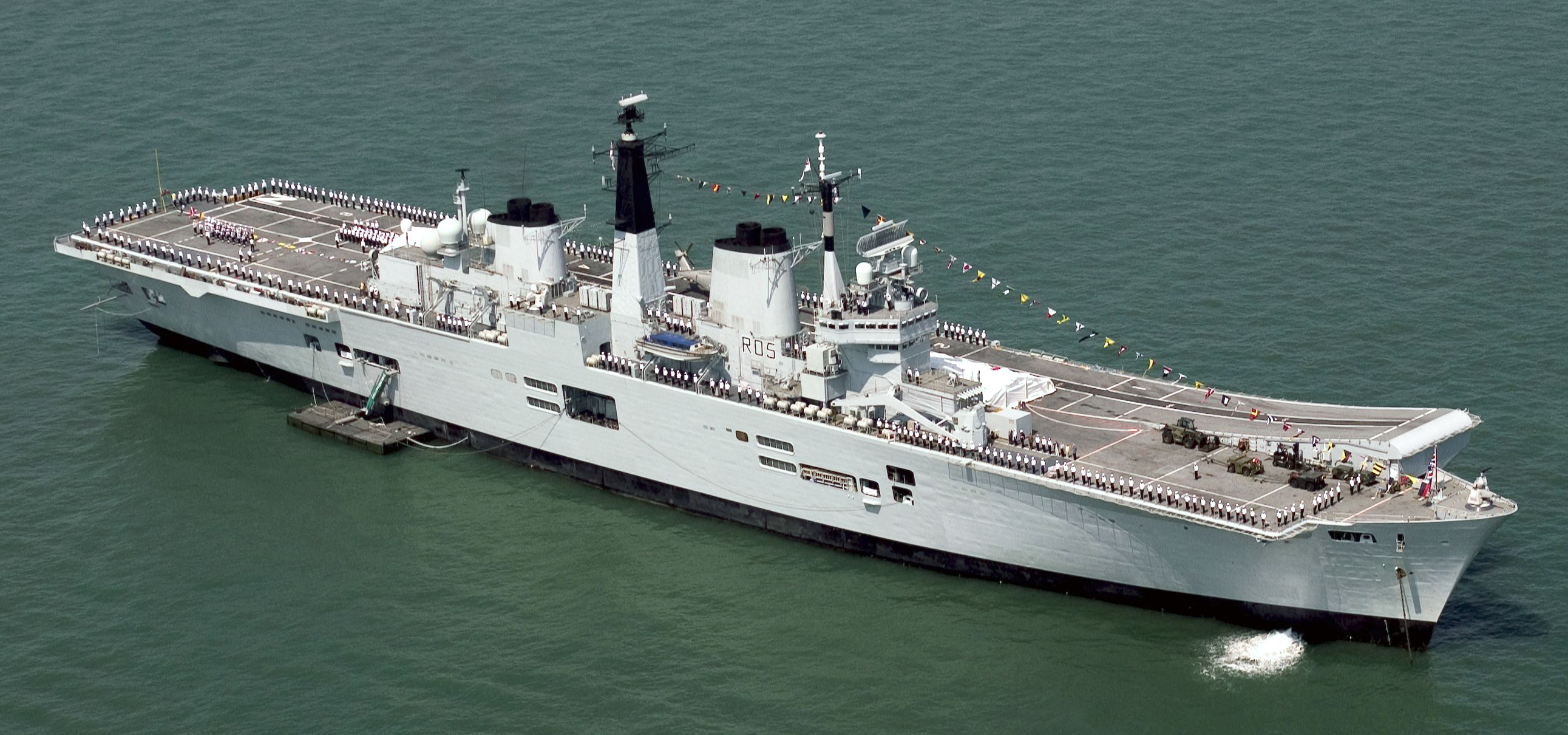
Royal Navy's HMS Invincible was the first light aircraft carrier equipped with a ski jump ramp.

In World War II, the United States Navy produced a number of light carriers by converting cruiser hulls. These Independence-class aircraft carriers, converted from Cleveland-class light cruisers, were unsatisfactory ships for aviation with their narrow, short decks and slender, high-sheer hulls; in virtually all respects the escort carriers were superior aviation vessels. These issues were superseded by Independence-class ships' virtue of being available at a time when available carrier decks had been reduced to Enterprise and Saratoga in the Pacific and Ranger in the Atlantic. In addition, they had enough speed to take part in fleet actions with the larger carriers while escort carriers did not. Late in the war, a follow on to the Independence class, the Saipan class, was designed. Two vessels in this class—Saipan and Wright—were completed after the war's end. After very brief lives as carriers, the Saipans were converted to command and communication ships.

By the start of World War II, the Royal Navy's HMS Hermes, the first purpose-built aircraft carrier (launched 1919, sunk 1942) was being considered as equivalent to a light aircraft carrier, due to her small size, small aircraft complement and lack of armour. The British 1942 Design Light Fleet Carrier, originally designated the Colossus class, was a scaled-down version of their Illustrious-class fleet carrier. The design could be built in a yard with little or no experience of warship construction. Although built to merchant standards, the design incorporated better watertight subdivision. Expected to have a lifetime of about three years, the last of the design was taken out of service in 2001. The first ten were built as the Colossus class, though two of these were modified whilst under construction into aircraft maintenance carriers. An additional five carriers, none of which were completed in time for service in World War II, were built with revisions upgrading the design to handle larger and heavier aircraft, receiving the designation Majestic class. In the post-war period, the Royal Navy operated a force of the ten Colossus carriers, while the five Majestic carriers were sold, during construction, to Australia, Canada and India. The Majestics were followed, after the war, by the four light carriers of the Centaur class.

In the 1970s the Royal Navy introduced a new type of light carrier, designed to operate the V/STOL Hawker Siddeley Harrier. Originally classed as "through-deck cruisers", the three-ship Invincible class served into the early 21st century; HMS Invincible was key to the British victory in the Falklands War.

== List of light carriers ==
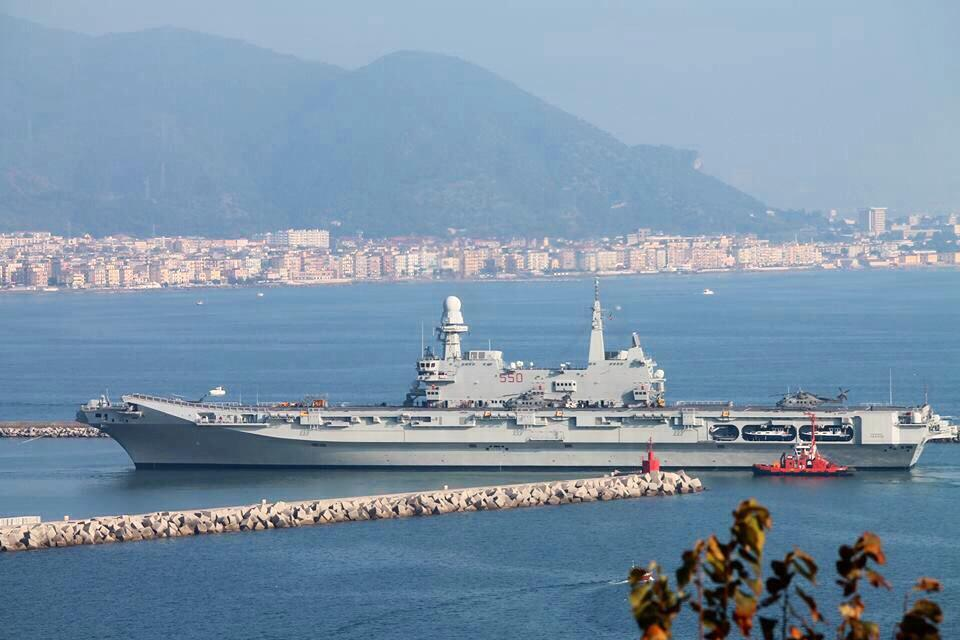
Light carrier Cavour of the Italian Navy

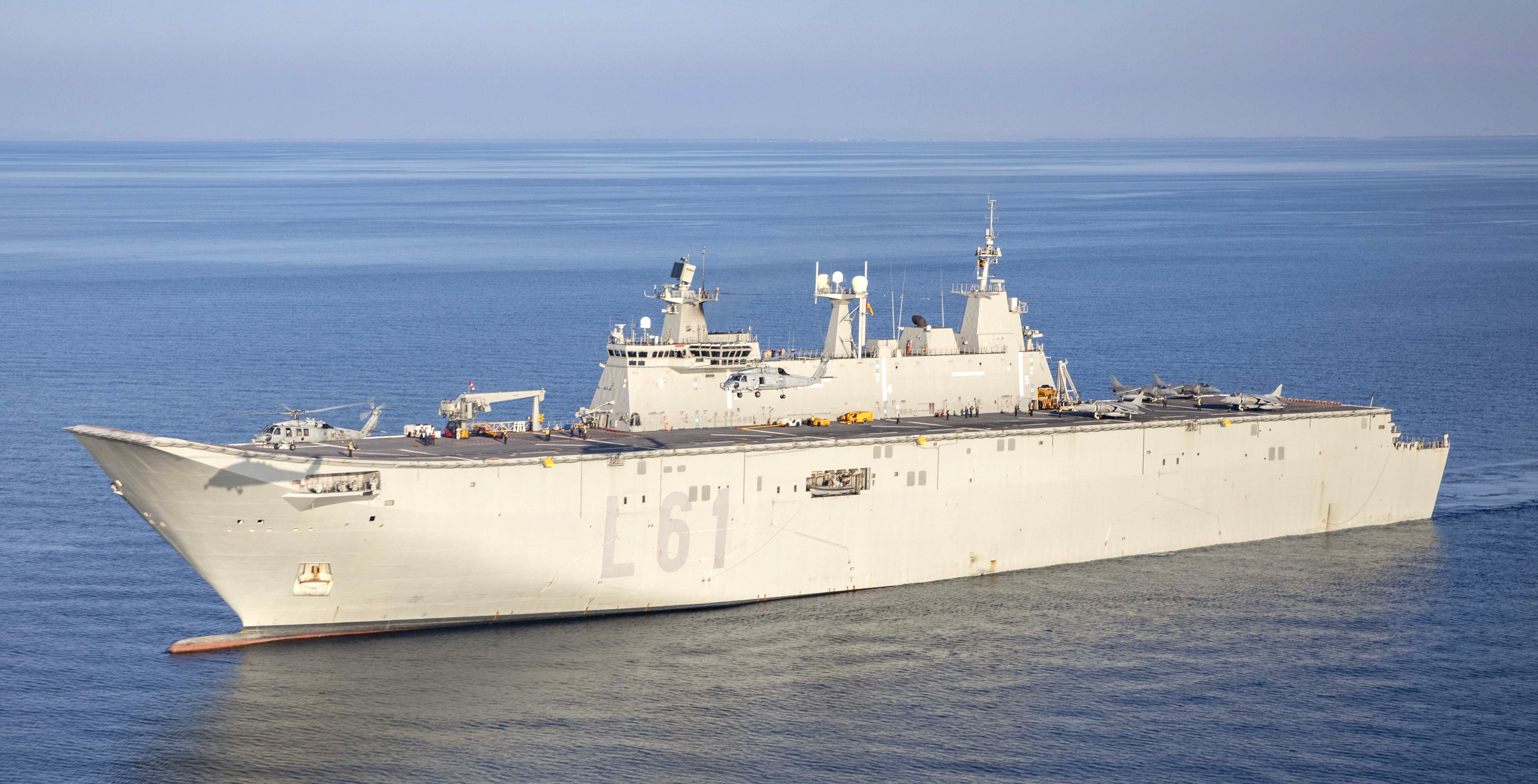
Juan Carlos I of the Spanish Navy

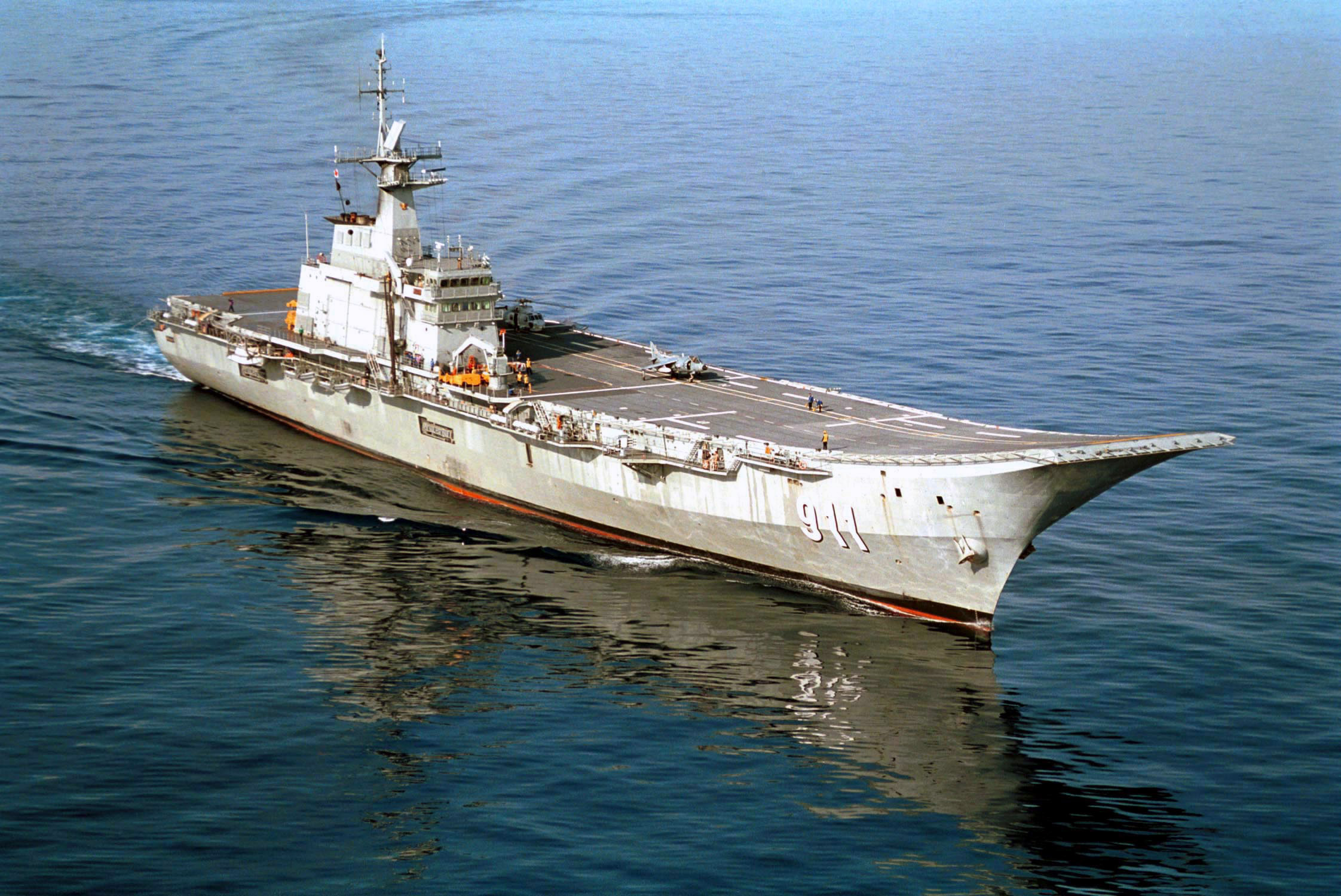
Light carrier Chakri Naruebet of the Thailand Navy

=== Active ===
Japan

- Izumo class
  - Izumo
  - Kaga

Indonesia

- KRI Sriwijaya (ex-Giuseppe Garibaldi)

Italy

- Cavour

Spain

- Juan Carlos I

Thailand

- HTMS Chakri Naruebet

=== Retired ===
Argentina

- ARA Independencia (Colossus class)
- ARA Veinticinco de Mayo (Colossus class)

Australia

- HMAS Sydney (Majestic class)
- HMAS Vengeance (Colossus class)
- HMAS Melbourne (Majestic class)

Brazil

- Minas Gerais (Colossus class)

Canada

- HMCS Warrior (Colossus class)
- HMCS Magnificent (Majestic class)
- HMCS Bonaventure (Majestic class)

France

- Lafayette class (ex-Independence class):
  - Bois Belleau
  - La Fayette
- Arromanches (Colossus class)

India

- INS Vikrant (Majestic class)
- INS Viraat (Centaur class)

Iran

- IRIS Shahid Bagheri

Italy

- Giuseppe Garibaldi

Japan

- Hōshō
- Ryūjō
- Hiyō class
  - Hiyō
  - Jun'yō
- Zuihō class
  - Zuihō
  - Shōhō
- Ryūhō
- Chitose class
  - Chitose
  - Chiyoda

Netherlands

- HNLMS Karel Doorman (Colossus class)

Spain

- Dédalo (Independence class)
- Príncipe de Asturias

United Kingdom

- HMS Hermes
- HMS Unicorn
- 1942 Design Light Fleet Carrier
  - Colossus class
    - HMS Colossus
    - HMS Glory
    - HMS Ocean
    - HMS Venerable
    - HMS Vengeance
    - HMS Pioneer (maintenance carrier)
    - HMS Warrior
    - HMS Theseus
    - HMS Triumph
    - HMS Perseus (maintenance carrier)
  - Majestic class (none saw service in the Royal Navy)
    - Majestic (entered service as HMAS Melbourne)
    - Terrible (entered service as HMAS Sydney)
    - Magnificent (entered service as HMCS Magnificent)
    - Hercules (entered service as INS Vikrant)
    - Powerful (entered service as HMCS Bonaventure)
- Centaur class
  - HMS Centaur
  - HMS Albion
  - HMS Bulwark
  - HMS Hermes
- Invincible class
  - HMS Invincible
  - HMS Illustrious
  - HMS Ark Royal

United States

- Independence class
  - USS Bataan
  - USS Belleau Wood
  - USS Cabot
  - USS Cowpens
  - USS Independence
  - USS Langley
  - USS Monterey
  - USS Princeton
  - USS San Jacinto
- Saipan class
  - USS Saipan
  - USS Wright

== See also ==
- Anti-submarine warfare carrier
- Escort carrier of post-World War II
- Helicopter carrier
- Amphibious assault ship
- Landing helicopter assault
- Landing helicopter dock
- Landing platform helicopter
- List of STOVL carriers
- List of aircraft carriers of World War II
- List of escort aircraft carriers of the Second World War
