= USS Wright (CVL-49) =

Saipan-class light aircraft carrier of the US Navy

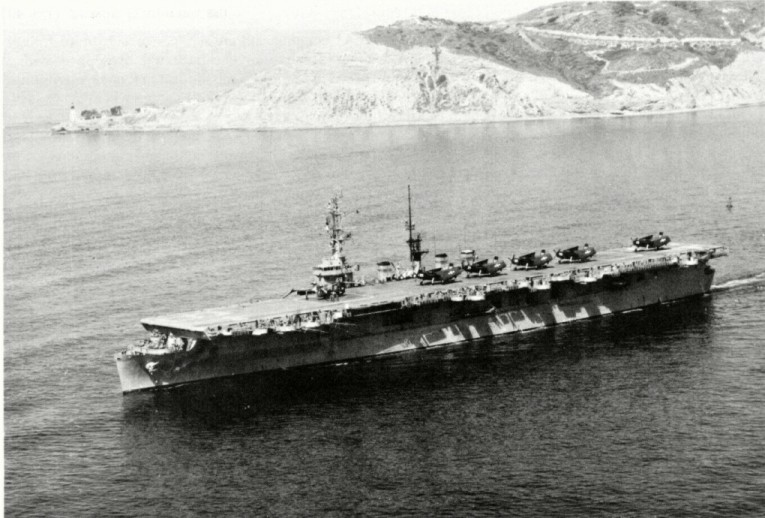
- USS Wright (CVL-49) from early 1950s

History

United States
- Name: Wright
- Namesake: Wright Brothers
- Builder: New York Shipbuilding Corporation
- Laid down: 21 August 1944
- Launched: 1 September 1945
- Commissioned: 9 February 1947
- Decommissioned: 15 March 1956
- Recommissioned: 11 May 1963
- Decommissioned: 27 May 1970
- Reclassified: AVT-7, 15 May 1959; CC-2, 1963
- Stricken: 1 December 1977
- Honors and awards: National Defense Service Medal (2)
- Fate: Scrapped, 1 August 1980

General characteristics
- Class & type: Saipan-class aircraft carrier
- Displacement: 14,500 tons
- Length: 684 ft (208 m)
- Beam: 76.8 ft (23.4 m) (waterline); 115 ft (35 m) (overall)
- Draft: 28 ft (8.5 m)
- Speed: 33 knots (61 km/h; 38 mph)
- Complement: 1,787 officers and enlisted
- Armament: 40 × Bofors 40 mm guns
- Aircraft carried: 50+ aircraft

USS Wright (CVL-49/AVT-7) was a Saipan-class light aircraft carrier of the U.S. Navy, later converted to the command ship CC-2. It is the second ship named "Wright". The first Wright (AV-1) was named for Orville Wright; the second honored both Wright brothers: Orville and Wilbur.

== Construction ==
Wright was laid down on 21 August 1944, at Camden, New Jersey, by the New York Shipbuilding Corporation, launched on 1 September 1945, sponsored by Mrs. Harold S. Miller, a niece of the Wright brothers, and commissioned at the Philadelphia Naval Shipyard on 9 February 1947.

== Service history ==
Wright departed Philadelphia on 18 March 1947 and stopped briefly at Norfolk, Virginia, en route to the Naval Air Training Base at Pensacola, Florida. After her arrival there on 31 March, Wright soon commenced a rigorous schedule of air defense drills and gunnery practice while acting as a qualification carrier for hundreds of student pilots at the Naval Air Training Base, relieving Saipan. Wright would embark on 40 operational cruises—each of between one and four days' duration off the Florida coast. In addition, the carrier embarked a total of 1,081 naval reservists and trained them in a series of three two-week duty tours.

On 3 September 1947, Wright embarked 48 Midshipmen for temporary training duty and later welcomed 62 Army officers when she stood out to sea on 15 October, in company with Forrest Royal to let her guests observe flight operations in the Pensacola area. The exercises included the catapulting of Grumman F6F Hellcats for rocket-firing operations.

That exercise was her last prior to her departure from Pensacola on 24 October, to return north. She arrived at the Philadelphia Naval Shipyard soon thereafter and from 1 November to 17 December, underwent post-shakedown repairs and alterations before she returned to Pensacola two days before Christmas, where she resumed her regular schedule of pilot qualification training under the operational control of the Chief of Naval Air Training, Commander Air Atlantic. Wright spent the year 1948 engaged in those pilot carrier qualification operations, before she put into the Norfolk Naval Shipyard on 26 January 1949, to commence a four-month overhaul. She was relieved as training carrier by Cabot.

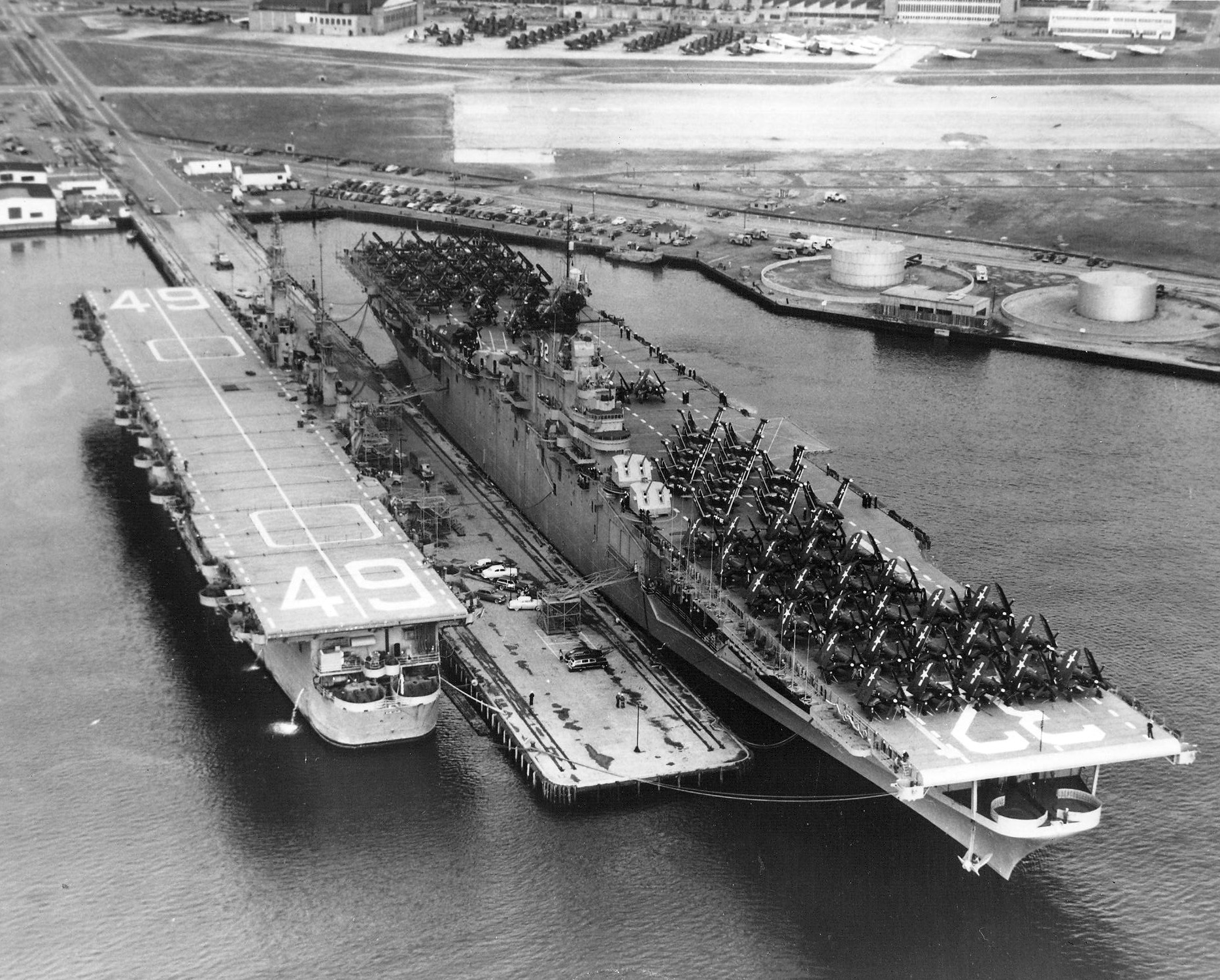
Wright and Leyte at Quonset Point, c.1950

Following refresher training in Cuban waters, Wright returned to Norfolk on 1 August 1949, and four days later shifted to Newport, Rhode Island, for two weeks of antisubmarine warfare (ASW) training in the Narragansett Bay area with submarines and destroyers. She also visited New York City before taking up a steady schedule of carrier qualifications, air defense tactics, and exercises out of Quonset Point, Rhode Island, Key West, and Pensacola. But for 10 days of maneuvers with the 2d Task Fleet from 21 to 31 October 1949, she continued that duty until 7 January 1951, when she embarked the last increment of personnel from Fighter Squadron 14 (VF-14) for temporary duty.

== Service with 6th Fleet ==
Wright sailed from Norfolk, on 11 January 1951, with a fast carrier task group and reached Gibraltar on 21 January, for her first tour of duty with the 6th Fleet in the Mediterranean. Wright's first Mediterranean deployment took her from Gibraltar to Oran, Algeria. She proceeded thence to Augusta Bay, Sicily; Suda Bay, Crete; Beirut, Lebanon; and Golfe Juan, France—her replenishment and liberty ports during the never-ending cycle of fleet training and readiness exercises with the 6th Fleet. Departing Golfe Juan on 19 March, Wright made port at Newport on 31 March 1951.

The carrier later entered the Norfolk Naval Shipyard and underwent an overhaul there before she took part in Atlantic Fleet maneuvers out of Guantanamo Bay, Cuba; engaged in ASW tactics and carrier operations in Narragansett Bay, received further repairs at the Boston Naval Shipyard, and participated in a convoy exercise that ran from 25 February to 21 March 1952; and ranged from Newport to waters of the Panama Canal Zone and Trinidad in the British West Indies.

As flagship for Carrier Division 14, Wright sailed on 9 June 1952, in company with four destroyers forming Task Group (TG) 81.4 for ASW operations along the Atlantic seaboard until 27 June, when the ships arrived at New York City. Returning to Quonset Point on 1 July, Wright trained units of the organized Naval Reserve concurrently with hunter–killer tactics and pilot training in operations out of Narragansett Bay until 26 August. On that day, she set course from Quonset Point and later rendezvoused with Vice Admiral Felix Stump's 2d Task Fleet en route to northern Europe for combined defense exercises and maneuvers with naval units of other North Atlantic Treaty Organization (NATO) navies.

En route, Wright, escorted by Forrest Royal, was detached to ferry men and gear of Marine Night Fighter Squadron (VMF(N)) 114 to Port Lyautey, Morocco, an operation she completed on 4 September. Two days later, Wright and her escort rejoined the task force; and they reached the Firth of Clyde, Scotland, on 10 September.

Three days later, Wright put to sea with two British destroyers acting as her plane guard for NATO Operation Mainbrace. She conducted air defense maneuvers and tactics evolutions with the British carriers HMS Illustrious and HMS Eagle en route to Rotterdam, Netherlands, where the force arrived on 25 September. On 29 September, Wright departed Rotterdam, bound for the United States, and arrived at Newport on 9 October.

That day, she embarked Rear Admiral W. L. Erdman, Commander, Carrier Division 4, and spent the next few months engaged in carrier qualification duties in waters ranging from Newport to the Virginia Capes, before she began her second deployment to the Mediterranean. She reached Golfe Juan on 21 February 1953, and operated with the 6th Fleet until 31 March, when she sailed for home, via the Azores.

Wright returned to Newport, and after a rigorous schedule of training in Narragansett Bay, sailed on 5 May, for the Gulf of Mexico. During that training cruise, she visited Houston, Texas, where she hosted some 14,000 visitors on 16 and 17 May. Returning to Quonset Point on 28 May, Wright operated locally for another month before shifting south for a stint of operations out of Mayport, Florida.

== Service with 7th Fleet ==
Wright was overhauled at the Philadelphia Naval Shipyard from 31 July to 21 November 1953, and then conducted refresher training in Cuban waters from 4 January to 16 February 1954. Next, after departing Quonset Point, Rhode Island, on 5 April, Wright sailed for Norfolk, Virginia where she took on necessary stores and supplies in preparation for her transfer to the Pacific Fleet. On 20 April, Wright set sail for the Western Pacific via the Panama Canal; San Diego, California; and Pearl Harbor—and reached United States Fleet Activities Yokosuka, Japan, on 28 May. The carrier, with Marine Attack Squadron 211 embarked, operated with the 7th Fleet off both coasts of Korea and also off Okinawa before she visited Hong Kong from 24 to 30 September. Departing Yokosuka on 15 October, Wright arrived at San Diego on the last day of October and entered the Long Beach Naval Shipyard, where she remained until 23 February 1955.

At that point, Wright was attached to CarDiv 17, Pacific Fleet, and operated locally out of San Diego until 3 May, when she put to sea as part of TG 7.3—formed around the flagship Mount McKinley—for the atomic test, Operation Wigwam, carried out in Pacific waters. Returning to the West Coast on 20 May, Wright subsequently cruised to Pearl Harbor briefly before she entered the Mare Island Naval Shipyard on 14 July to commence preparation for inactivation. After shifting to the Puget Sound Naval Shipyard, Bremerton, Washington, on 17 October, for the final phase of preservation for inactivation, Wright was decommissioned at Puget Sound on 15 March 1956, and assigned to the Bremerton group of the Pacific Reserve Fleet.

== Reclassification ==
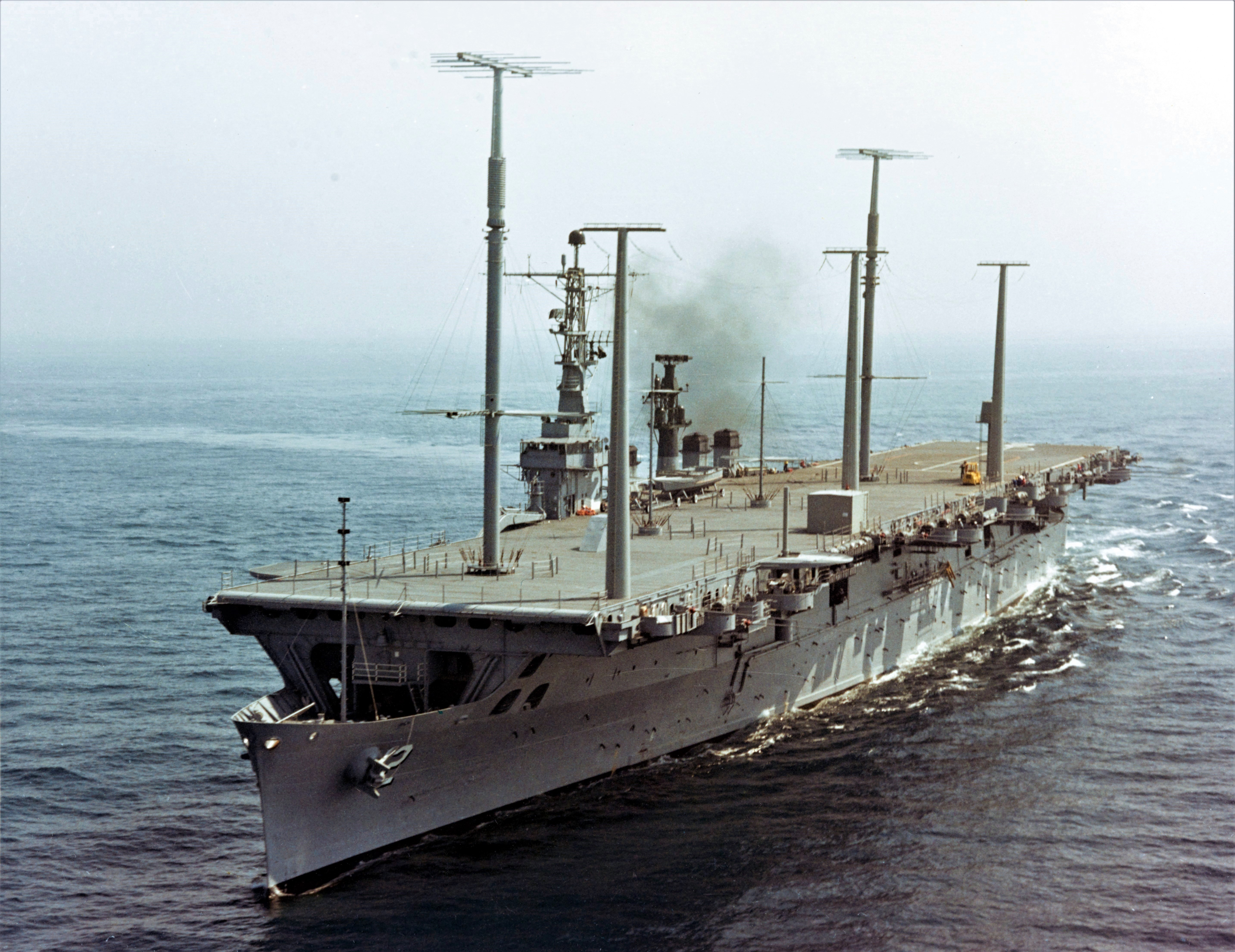
USS Wright as CC-2 off Southern California in September 1963

During her time in reserve, Wright was reclassified on 15 May 1959, an auxiliary aircraft transport, AVT-7. However, she never served in that role but remained inactive until 15 March 1962, when she was taken to the Puget Sound Naval Shipyard for conversion to a command ship and reclassified as CC-2. The conversion—which lasted a year—included extensive alterations to enable the ship to function as a fully equipped mobile command post afloat for top-echelon commands and staff for strategic direction of area or worldwide military operations. Facilities were built into the ship for worldwide communications and rapid automatic exchange, processing, storage, and display of command data. A portion of the former hangar deck space was utilized for special command spaces and the extensive electronics equipment required, while a major portion of the flight deck was utilized for specially designed communications antenna arrays. In addition, facilities were provided to enable the ship to operate three helicopters.

Recommissioned at Puget Sound on 11 May 1963, Capt. John L. Arrington II, in command, Wright (CC-2) operated locally on trials and training evolutions in the waters off the Pacific Northwest until 3 September, when she departed Seattle and proceeded to San Diego, which she reached three days later. For the next three weeks, the ship trained in nearby waters before she returned to Puget Sound on 30 September to commence her post-shakedown availability.

Following those repairs and alterations—which took up all of the month of October and most of November—Wright prepared to shift to her new home port, Norfolk. She departed Seattle on 26 November, stopped briefly at San Diego three days later to embark civilian engineers and personnel who were to conduct surveys of communications and-air conditioning equipment, and was steaming south off the coast of northern Mexico when she picked up a distress message from the Israeli merchantman SS Velos, on 1 December. Wright altered course and rendezvoused with Velos later that same day. The command ship's medical officer was flown across to the Israeli ship and treated a seaman suffering from kidney stones. The medical officer was then flown back to Wright. Upon completion of that mission of mercy, Wright resumed her voyage to Balboa.

Transiting the Panama Canal on 7 and 8 December, Wright steamed via St. Thomas, Virgin Islands, and moored at the Hampton Roads Army Terminal on 18 December. After a subsequent brief operational period off the Virginia Capes, Wright entered port on 21 December, and remained there through Christmas and New Year's.

== NECPA duties ==
For the next six years, Wright operated out of Norfolk, training to perform her assigned mission as the National Emergency Command Post Afloat. Regular overhauls performed at the Norfolk Naval Shipyard saw the ship receiving the repairs and alterations that continually improved her capabilities to carry out her task. She operated primarily off the Virginia Capes, but ranged as far north as Bar Harbor, Maine, and as far south as Rio de Janeiro, Brazil, and Punta del Este, Uruguay. Her other ports of call included Newport, Quonset Point, Jacksonville, Mayport, Fort Lauderdale and Port Everglades, Florida; Boston; Portsmouth; New York City; Atlantic City; Annapolis; Philadelphia; Little Creek; Norfolk; and Guantánamo Bay. As part of NECPA duties, she alternated on alert status with Northampton.

There were highlights and breaks from the cycle of periods in port and at sea. From 11 to 14 April 1967, Wright lay at anchor off the coast of Uruguay, providing a worldwide communications capability in support of President Lyndon B. Johnson as he attended the Latin American summit conference at Punta del Este. On 8 May 1968, Wright went to the aid of Guadalcanal after that amphibious assault ship had suffered a machinery failure and had gone dead in the water, 180 miles (290 km) south of Norfolk. Wright towed the helpless assault ship 84 miles (135 km) before other ships arrived on the scene to help out. Later that same year, Wright received the coveted Captain Edward F. Ney Memorial Award in the large mess afloat category. That award is given annually to the ship that maintains the highest food standards. During the Pueblo crisis in February 1969, Wright, while en route to Port Everglades, Florida, was hurriedly recalled to Norfolk and, upon her arrival there, stood by, on alert.

== Decommissioning ==
Ultimately decommissioned on 27 May 1970, Wright was placed in reserve at the Philadelphia Naval Shipyard. The ship was stricken from the Navy List on 1 December 1977, and sold by the Defense Reutilization and Marketing Service (DRMS) for scrapping on 1 August 1980.

== Awards ==
=== USS Wright (CVL-49) ===
- Navy Occupation Service Medal with "Europe" clasp
- National Defense Service Medal
- Korean Service Medal
- United Nations Korean Medal
- Republic of Korea War Medal (retroactive)

=== USS Wright (CC-2) ===
- National Defense Service Medal with star (2 awards)

== Gallery ==
USS Wright Lifecycle

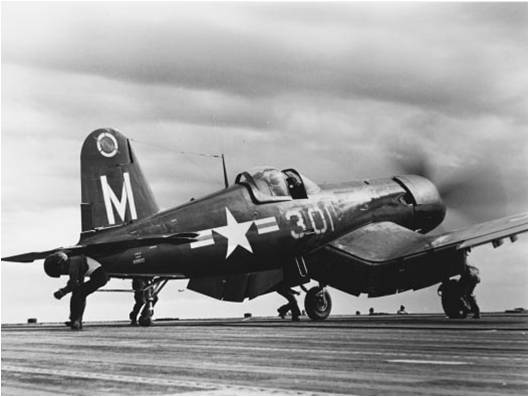
F4U-5 Corsair of VF-23 on USS Wright in November 1948

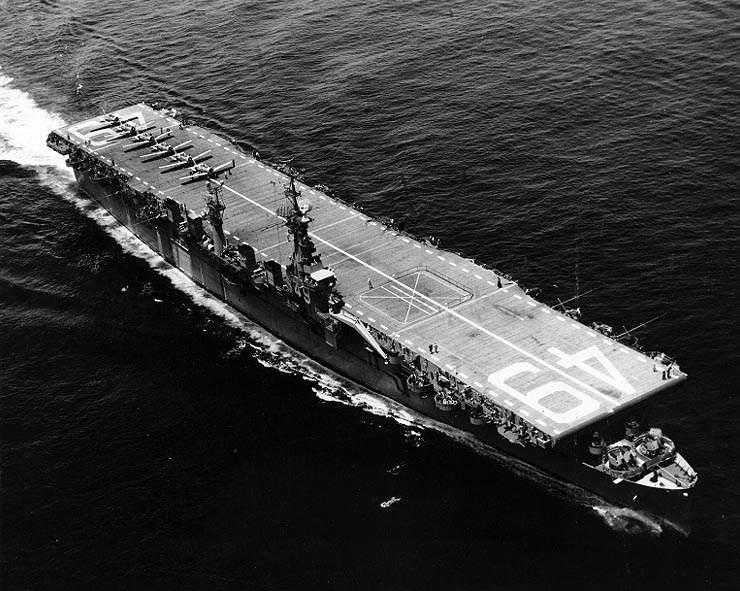
USS Wright underway at sea with North American T-6 Texans on board somewhere between the late 1940s and the early 1950s

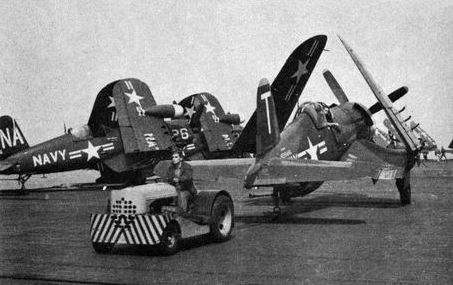
F4U-4 Corsairs of VF-14 aboard USS Wright in early 1951

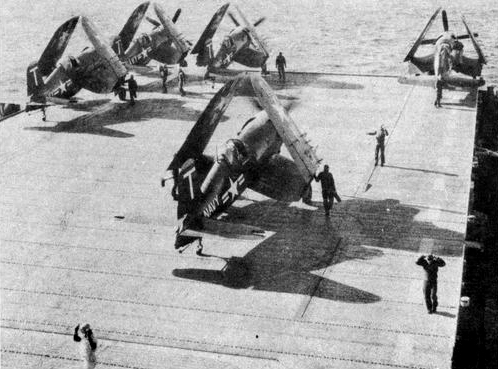
F4U-4 Corsairs of VF-14 on USS Wright in early 1951

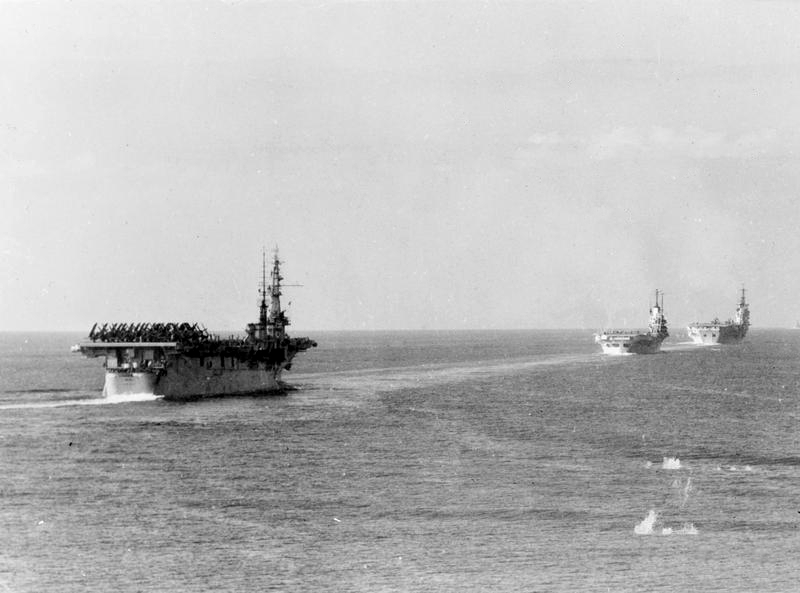
USS Wright, HMS Illustrious (R87) and HMS Eagle (R05) underway in the North Sea in September 1952

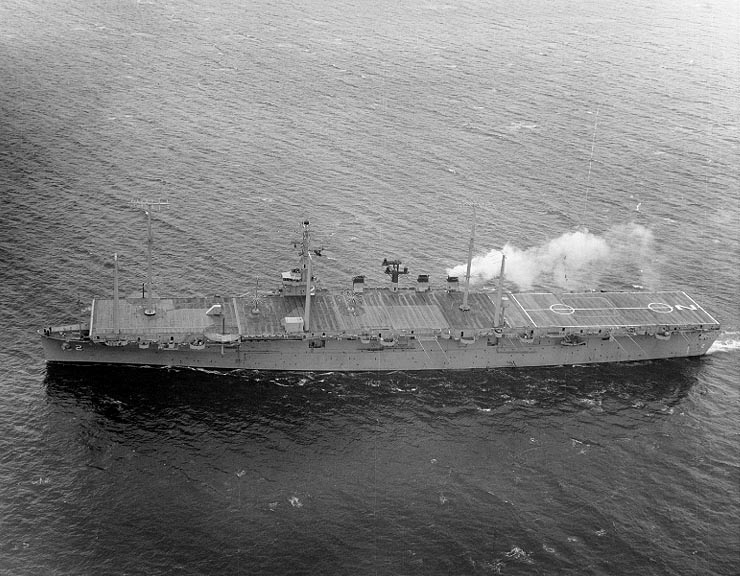
USS Wright as (CC-2) underway on 17 June 1963

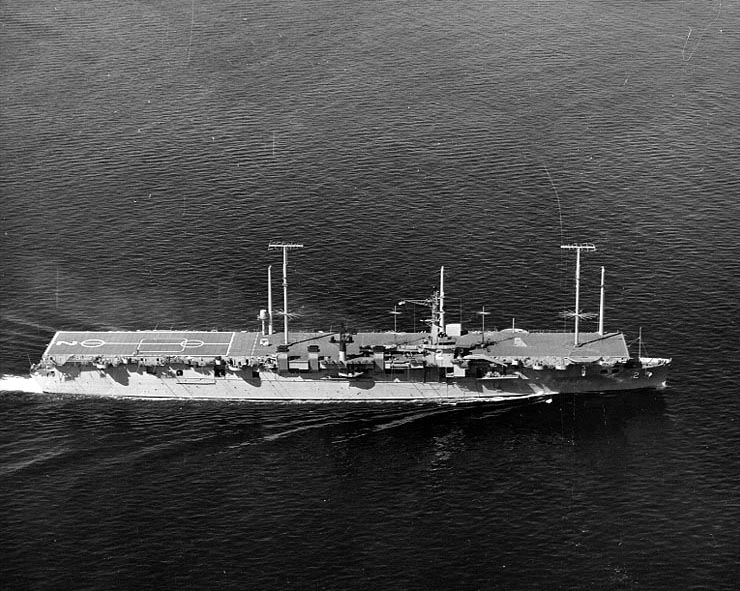
USS Wright underway at sea in September 1963

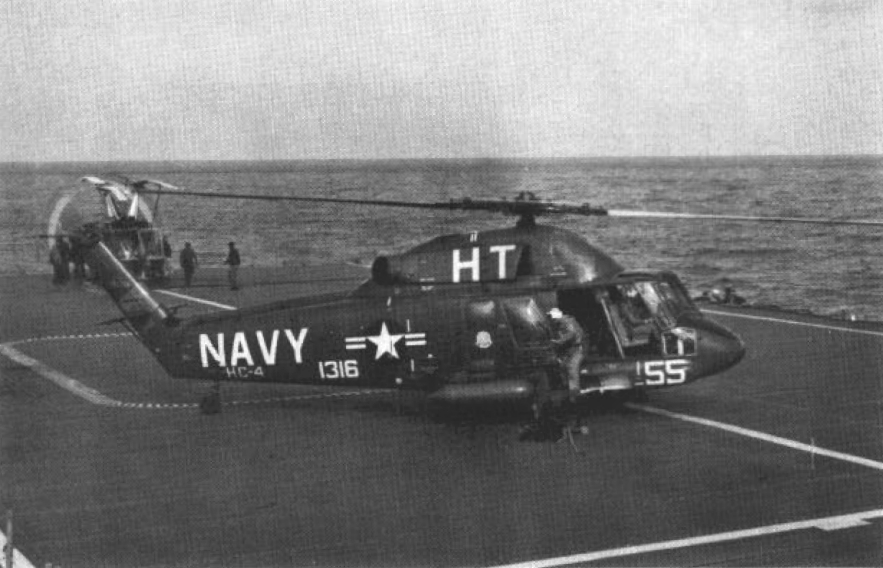
UH-2B of HC-4 on board USS Wright in c. 1966

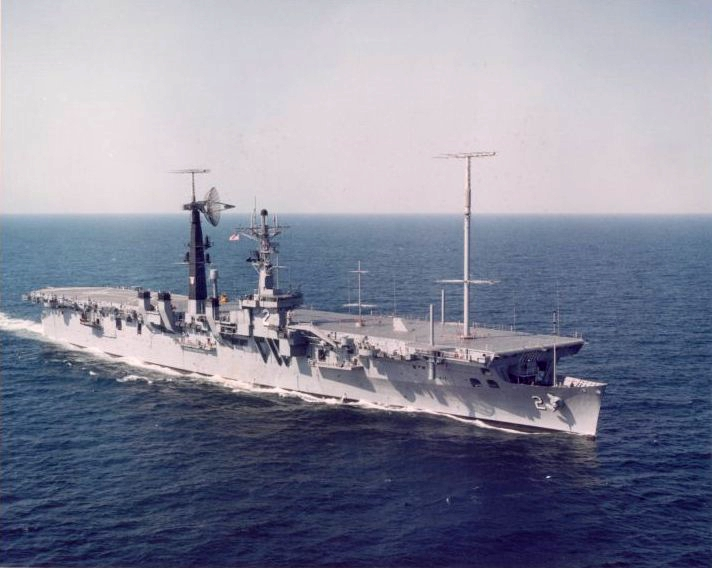
USS Wright at sea in c. 1967
