= VMA-324 =

Marine Attack Squadron 324
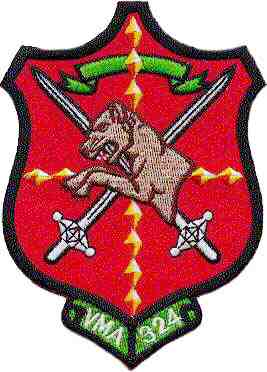
- VMA-324 Insignia
- Active: 1 Oct 1943 – 15 Oct 1945; 17 Mar 1952 – 29 Aug 1974
- Country: United States
- Allegiance: United States of America
- Branch: United States Marine Corps
- Type: Attack squadron
- Role: Close air support Air interdiction
- Part of: Inactive
- Nicknames: Vagabonds (WWII); Devil Dogs (50s–70s)
- Tail Code: DX

Aircraft flown
- Attack: Douglas A-1 Skyraider; A4A Skyhawk
- Fighter: F4U Corsair (1943–45)

Marine Attack Squadron 324 (VMA-324) was an attack squadron in the United States Marine Corps. Nicknamed the "Devil Dogs," the squadron was based out of Marine Corps Air Station Beaufort, South Carolina for most of its history however it spent its last three years at Marine Corps Air Station Yuma, Arizona. Originally commissioned during World War II as a fighter squadron, VMF-324 deployed to Midway Atoll during the later months of the war never participating in combat operations. Following a post-war decommissioning, the squadron was reactivated during the Korean War as an attack squadron. VMA-324 conducted regular training evolutions and world-wide deployments until it was decommissioned on 29 August 1974.

== History ==
=== World War II ===
Marine Fighting Squadron 324 (VMF-324) was commissioned on 1 October 1943, at Marine Corps Air Station Cherry Point, North Carolina as part of Marine Aircraft Group 32 (MAG-32). That same month the squadron was sent to Marine Corps Auxiliary Airfield Oak Grove along with VMF-321 and Air Warning Squadron 3 to begin their initial training. The squadron moved up to Marine Corps Auxiliary Airfield Kinston in March 1944 as one of the first squadron's there after the field was opened. VMF-324 departed for Marine Corps Air Depot Miramar on 15 July 1944. During August 1944 detachments from the squadron rotated through Marine Corps Air Station Mojave for additional training in rockets and heavy bomb training.

VMF-324 departed San Diego on 30 August 1944, sailing for Hawaii. The squadron arrived at Pearl Harbor in September 1944, and temporarily staged out of Marine Corps Air Station Ewa. The squadron did not stay long in Hawaii joining Marine Aircraft Group 23 at Midway Atoll on 16 September 1944. The squadron remained on Midway conducting aerial patrols for the remainder of the war. During its time there, one pilot was killed, and three aircraft lost to accidents. The squadron was decommissioned at MCAS Ewa on 15 October 1945.

=== 1950s through 1974 ===
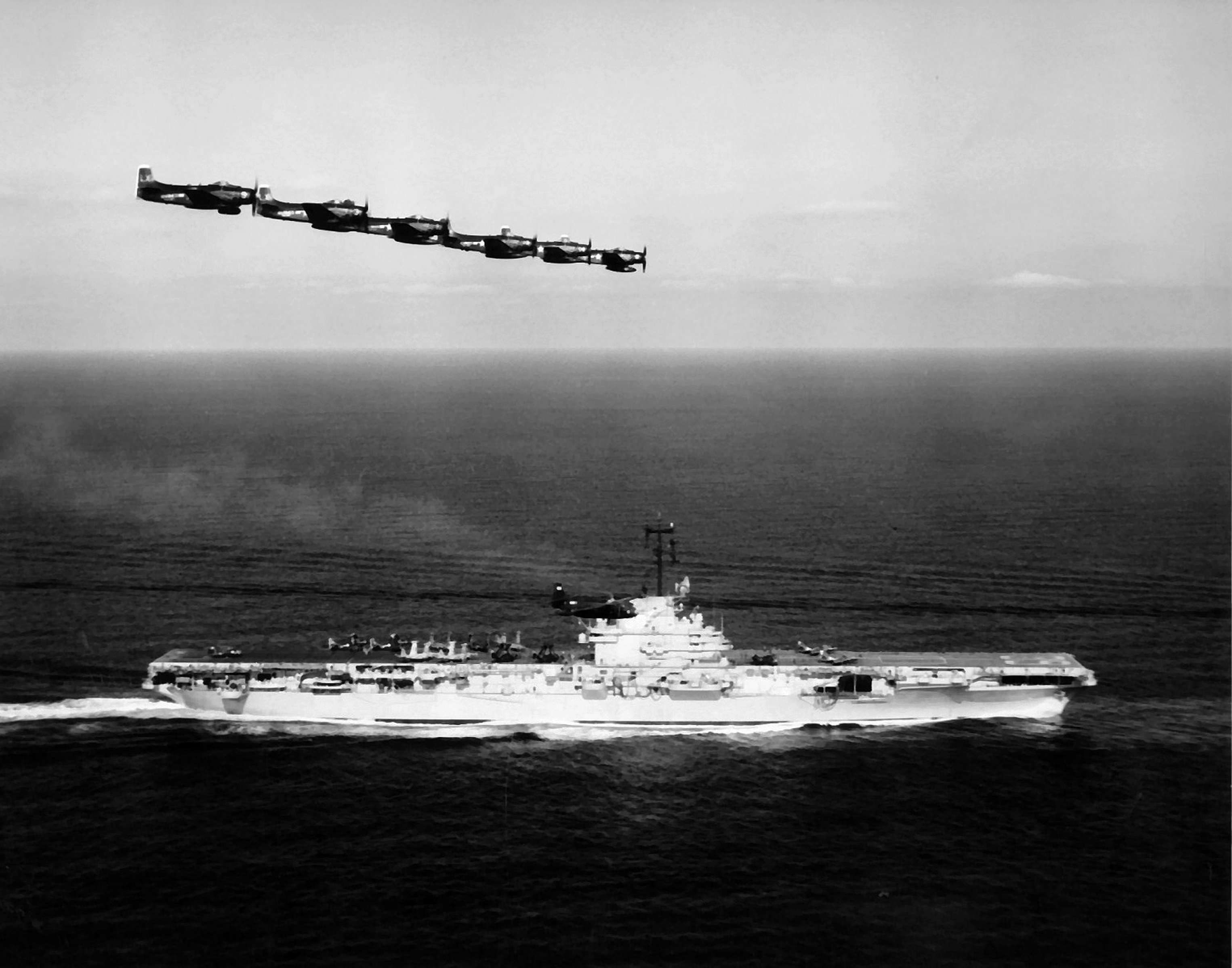
USS Lake Champlain with VMA-324 Skyraiders flying overhead.

On 18 April 1954, squadron pilots flew their F4U/G Corsairs from the USS Saipan's flight deck landing them at Tourane Air Base, to support the French Aéronavale fighting at the Battle of Dien Bien Phu in the latest days of the First Indochina War. The aircraft were turned over to French forces.

In the fall of 1957, VMA-324 flying from the USS Lake Champlain (CVS-39) along with other Marine Corps aviation squadrons, took part in Operation Deep Water, a NATO naval exercise held in the Mediterranean Sea that simulated protecting the Dardanelles from a Soviet invasion. The exercise was also the first time that a Marine Air-Ground Task Force had been used in a NATO exercise.

On 29 August 1974, VMA-324 was decommissioned during a ceremony at MCAS Beaufort. Squadron personnel and equipment were redesignated as VMA-311. Men and equipment that were part of VMA-311 under Marine Aircraft Group 12 at Marine Corps Air Station Iwakuni, Japan were absorbed into other units in the 1st Marine Aircraft Wing.

== Gallery ==
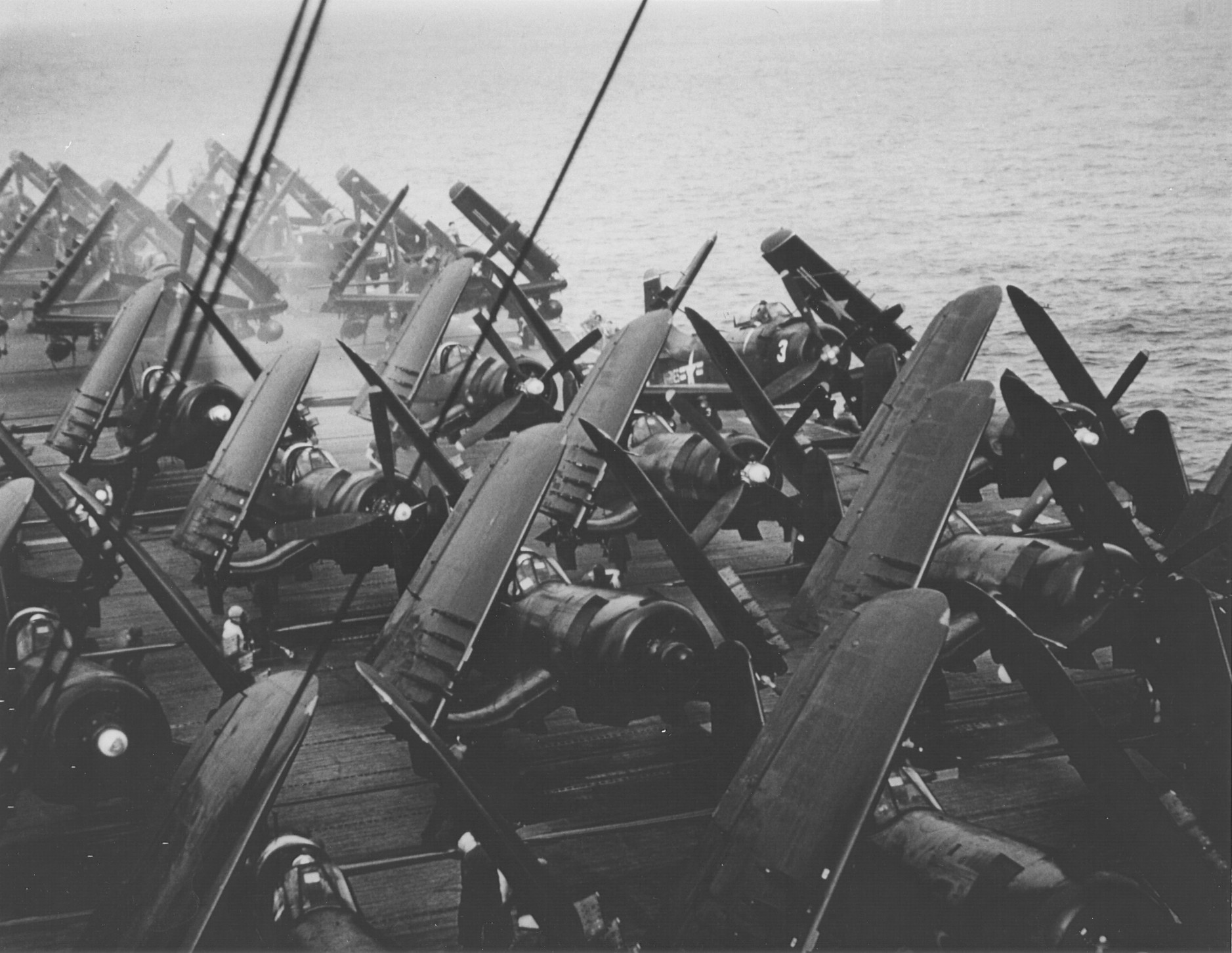
Unmarked Vought AU-1 Corsair fighters on the deck of the U.S. Navy light aircraft carrier USS Saipan (CVL-48) in the South China Sea, in 1954. The Corsairs were drawn from Marine Attack Squadron VMA-324 and flown from the Saipan to Da Nang and delivered to the French navy.

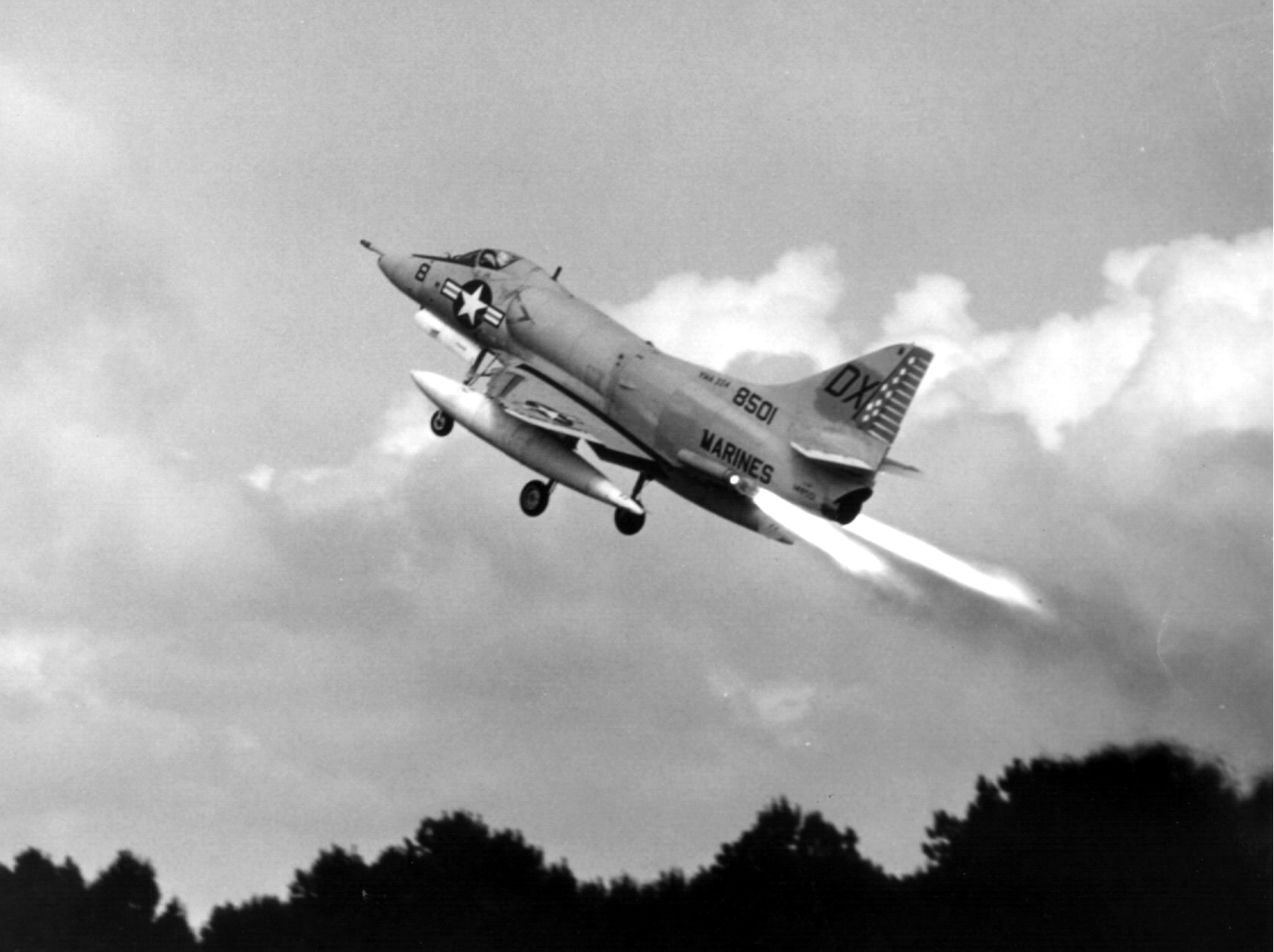
A4-C Skyhawk from VMA-324 demonstrates the use of JATO at Marine Corps Auxiliary Landing Field Bogue, North Carolina circa 1965.

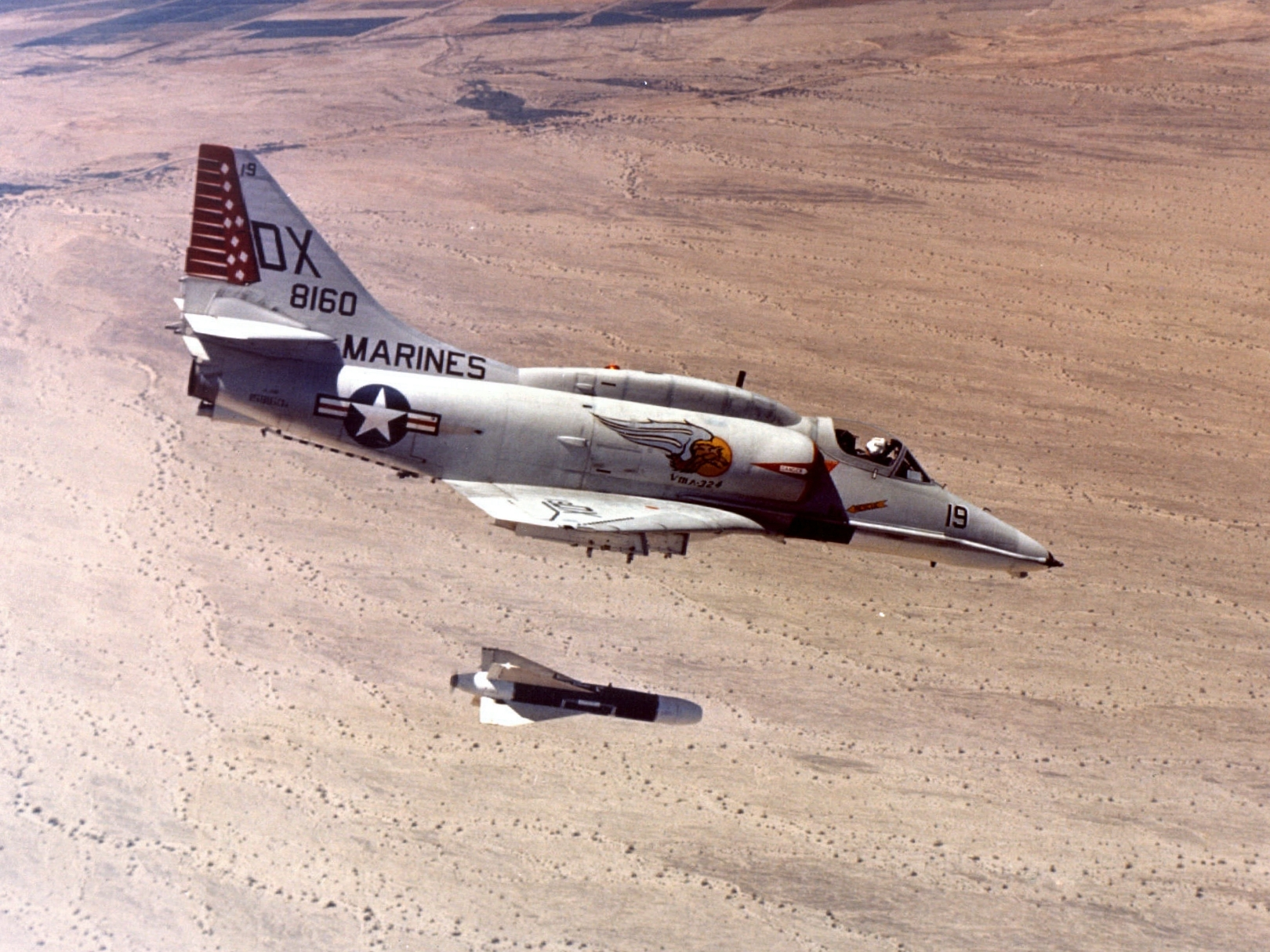
A-4M Skyhawk from VMA-324 launching an AGM-62 Walleye, 1970s

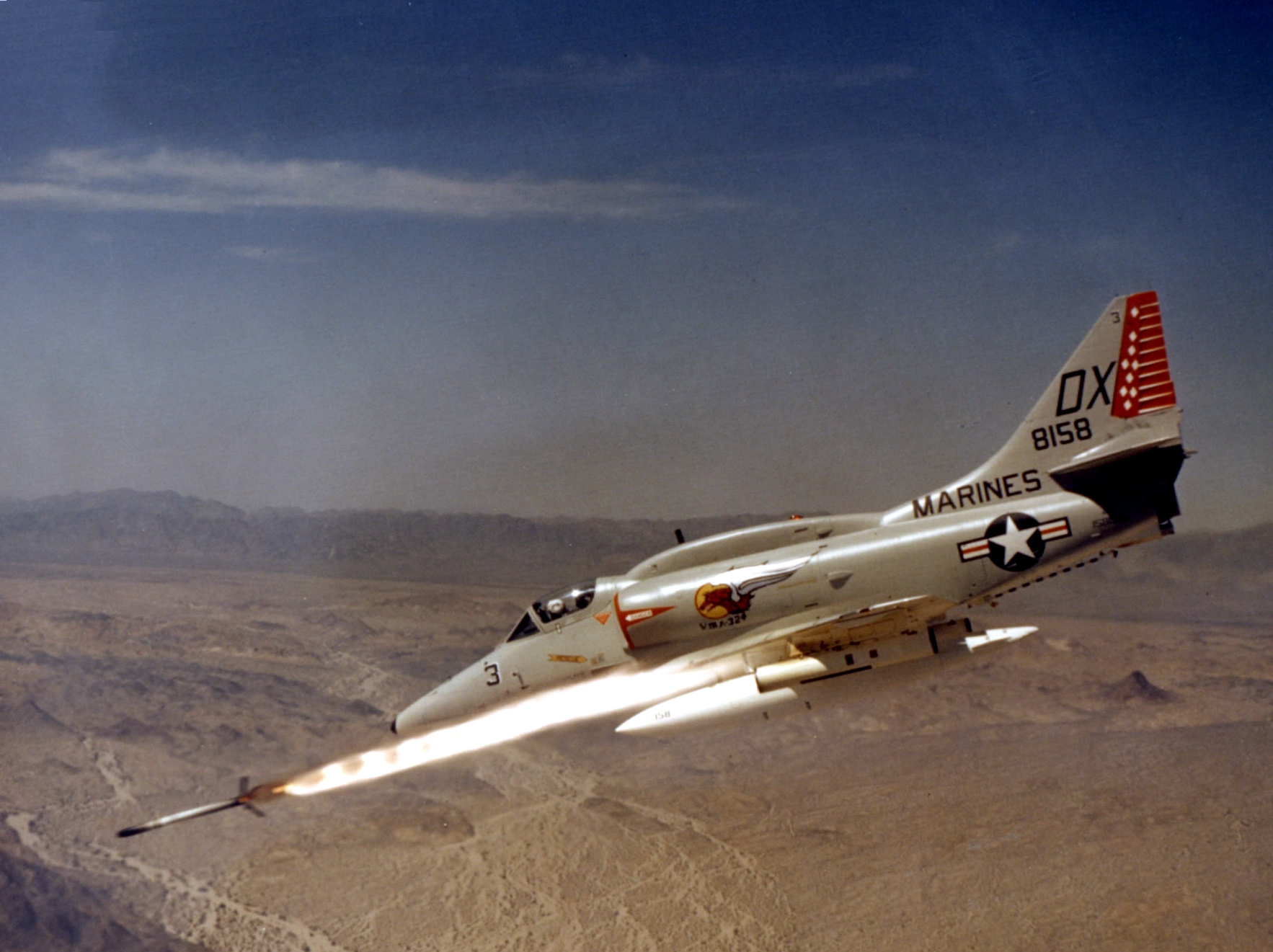
A-4M Skyhawk from VMA-324 launching a Zuni rocket, 1970s

== See also ==
- United States Marine Corps Aviation
- List of active United States Marine Corps aircraft squadrons
- List of decommissioned United States Marine Corps aircraft squadrons
