= Saipan-class aircraft carrier =

Light aircraft carrier class of the US Navy

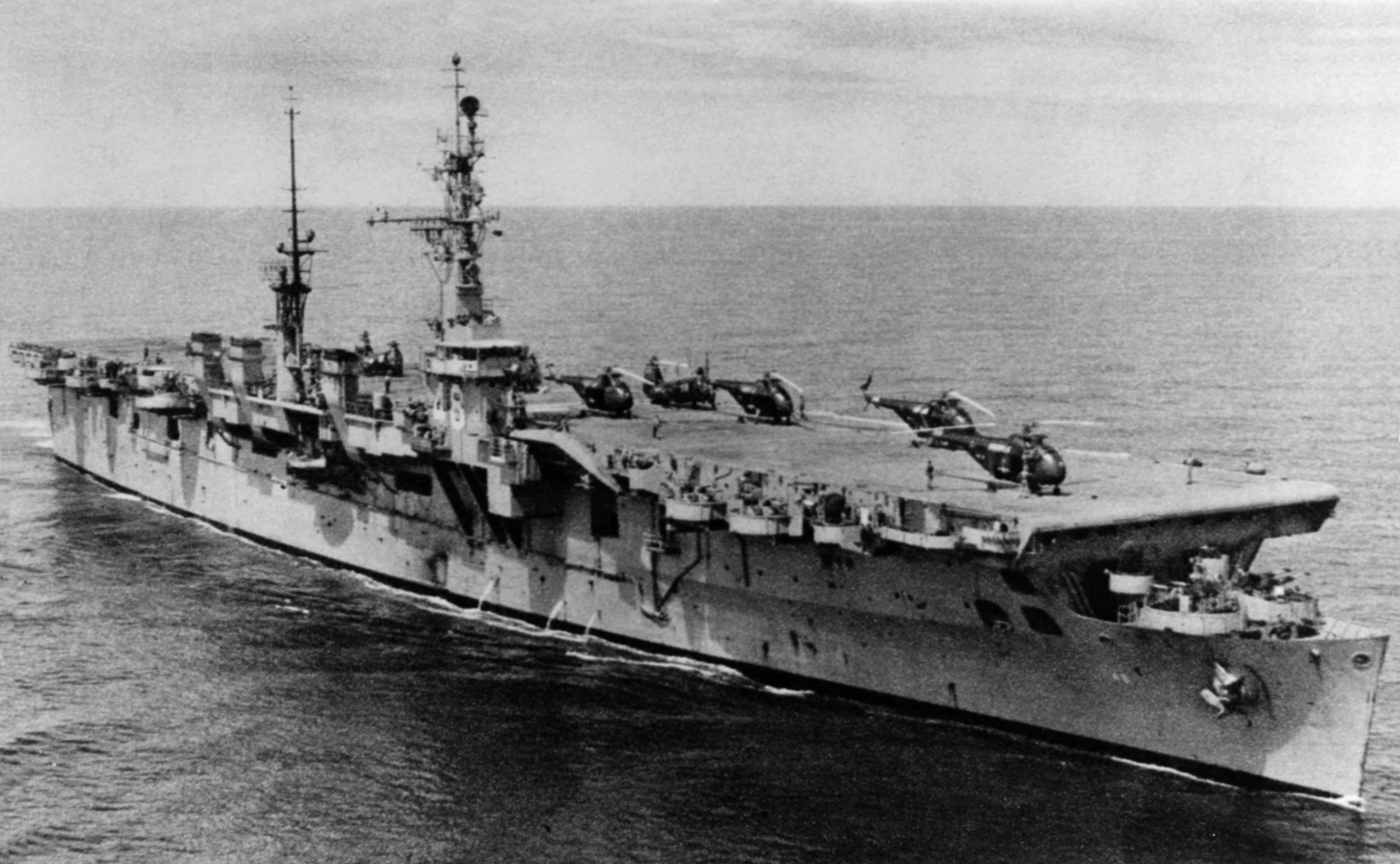
- USS Saipan

Class overview
- Builders: New York Shipbuilding Corporation
- Operators: United States Navy
- Preceded by: Independence class
- Succeeded by: None
- Built: 1944
- In commission: 1946–70
- Completed: 2
- Retired: 2

General characteristics
- Type: Light aircraft carrier
- Displacement: 14,500 (standard); 19,000 tons (full load)
- Length: 664 ft (202 m) wl; 683 ft 6 in (208.33 m) oa; 600 ft (180 m) (fd)
- Beam: 76.8 ft (23.4 m) (waterline); 115 ft (35 m) (overall)
- Draft: 28 ft (8.5 m)
- Propulsion: geared steam turbines producing 120,000 horsepower turning four propellers
- Speed: 33 knots (61 km/h)
- Complement: 1,700+ officers and men
- Armament: 42 × Bofors 40 mm guns (5 quad, 11 dual mountings); 16 dual 20 mm guns AA
- Aircraft carried: Planned complement of 42 aircraft: 18 Grumman F6F Hellcat fighters; 12 Curtiss SB2C Helldiver scout-bombers; 12 Grumman TBM Avenger torpedo planes

The Saipan-class aircraft carriers were a class of two light carriers Saipan (CVL-48) and Wright (CVL-49) built for the United States Navy during World War II. Like the nine Independence-class light carriers, they were based on cruiser hulls. However, they differed from the earlier light carriers in that they were built from the keel up as carriers, and were based on heavy rather than light cruiser hulls. Completed too late for the war, they served as carriers until the mid-1950s, then were converted into a command ship (Wright) and a major communications relay ship (Saipan) in the late 1950s, and served in those roles until 1970. They were both scrapped in 1980.

== Origins and design ==
Intended to offset expected wartime losses of the smaller Independence-class light carriers, the two ships of the Saipan class were designed from the keel up as aircraft carriers, with many improvements based on experience with the Independence class.

The Saipan class was based on the hull and machinery of the 13,600-ton Baltimore-class heavy cruiser hull rather than the smaller Cleveland-class light cruiser upon which the Independence class was built, allowing better seakeeping, improved hull subdivision, enhanced protection, greater magazine volume, a stronger flight deck, an expanded air group and a slightly higher speed than in the Independence class. Compared to their light cruiser half-sisters, they were eight feet wider in beam to accommodate the size and weight of the hangar and flight deck.

== Service ==
They had very brief service lives as light carriers, serving respectively from 1946 to 1957 (Saipan) and 1947 to 1956 (Wright). As carriers, they were swiftly outdated by the deckspace-eating jet aircraft of the 1950s, and quickly rendered far too small in a military environment where the 900-foot (270 m)-long Essex-class aircraft carriers were increasingly seen as cramped and small. The two ships were seen as valuable hulls, however, with a large void space within the ship that could easily be translated to other use. They were converted for non-carrier duties in the late 1950s, Saipan as the communications relay ship USS Arlington and Wright as a command ship. In these capacities the two ships served until being decommissioned in 1970 and scrapped in 1980.

== Ships in class ==
List of Saipan-class aircraft carriers
Ship	Hull no.	Builder	Laid down	Launched	Comm.	Decomm.	Fate
Saipan	CVL-48	New York Shipbuilding Corporation	10 July 1944	8 July 1945	14 July 1946	3 October 1957	Sold for scrap 1976
Wright	CVL-49	New York Shipbuilding Corporation	21 August 1944	1 September 1945	9 February 1947	15 March 1956	Sold for scrap 1980
