= CVX =

CVX may refer to:

- Chevron Corporation (NYSE stock ticker: CVX)
- Charlevoix Municipal Airport (FAA airport code CVX)
- Critical Viscosity of Xenon experiment
- Christian Life Community
- Chinese VX (EA-6043), an organophosphate nerve agent of the V-series
- CVX-class aircraft carrier, South Korean aircraft carrier class in development

== See also ==
- Gerald R. Ford-class aircraft carrier, codenamed CVNX in development
- CVX Live, a YouTuber convention
- CV (disambiguation)
- CV10 (disambiguation)
