= CV-33 =

CV-33 may refer to:

- USS Kearsarge (CV-33), an aircraft carrier operated by the United States Navy from 1946 until 1970
- L3/33 or Carro Veloce CV-33, an Italian tankette that served before and during World War II
- Autovía CV-33, an interurban motorway in the Spanish Valencian Community

== See also ==
- CV (disambiguation)
