= CV20 =

CV20, CV-20, or variation may refer to:

- USS Bennington (CV-20) was a U.S. Navy Essex-class aircraft carrier that was in commission from 1944 through 1946 and from 1952 through 1970
- Toyota Camry CV20 is a diesel version of the second generation Camry that was produced for model years 1986 through 1992

== See also ==
- CV (disambiguation)
