= SCB-27 =

US Navy aircraft carrier upgrade program

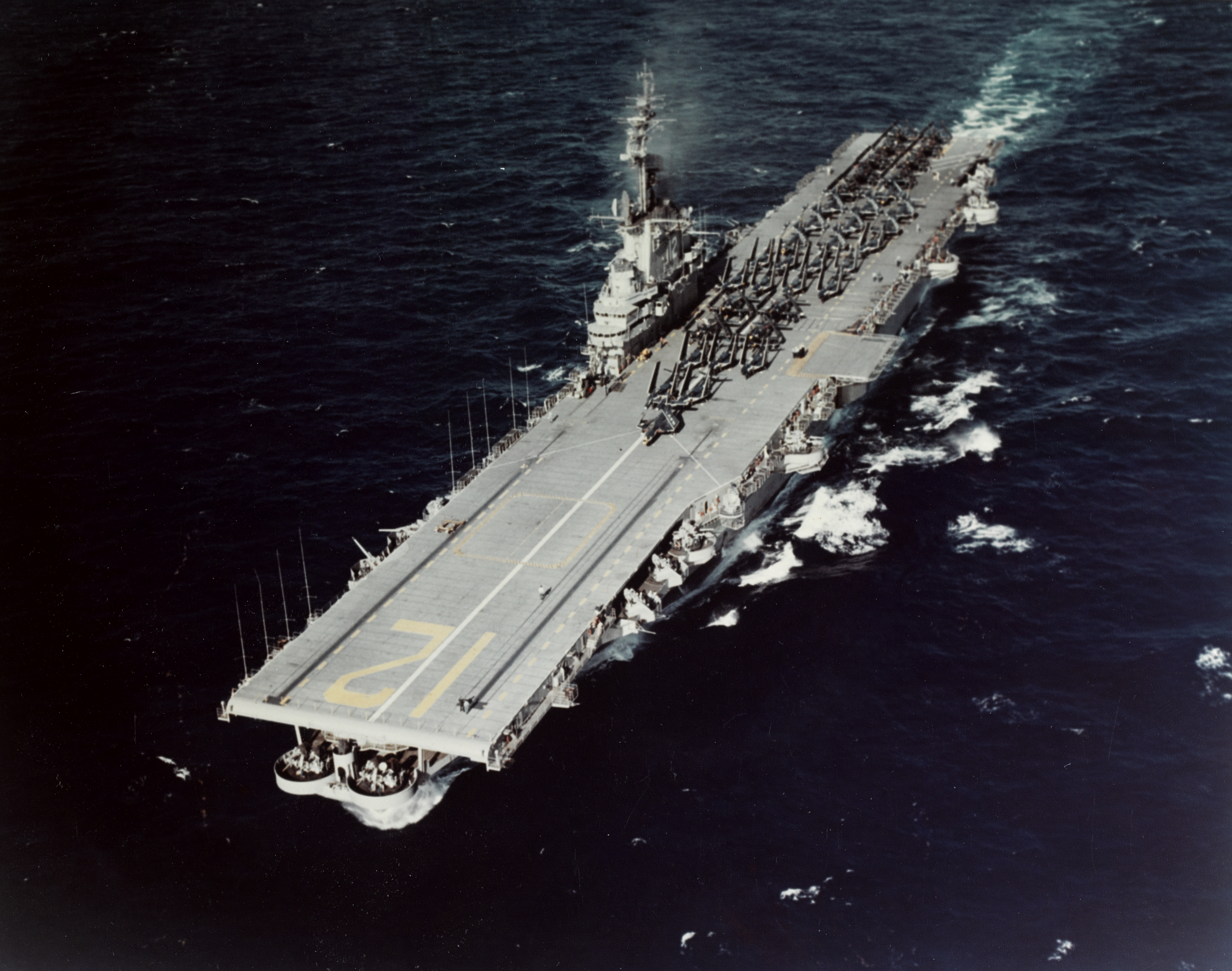
USS Hornet showing her SCB-27A configuration.

SCB-27 (also known as "Two Seven-Alpha" or "Two Seven-Charlie") was the United States Navy designation for a series of upgrades to the Essex-class aircraft carriers (both the short-hull and long-hull Ticonderoga versions), conducted between 1947 and 1955. These upgrades were intended to allow the World War II-era carriers to operate jet aircraft.

USS Oriskany, laid up incomplete at the conclusion of World War II, served as the prototype and was re-ordered to the SCB-27 standard. All but one of the SCB-27 modernized Essex carriers, the USS Lake Champlain, were further modified under the SCB-125 modernization program.

== Modifications ==
Officially, Ship Characteristics Board Program 27 proper referred to the completion of Oriskany, left unfinished at war's end, to a heavily revised design; reconstructions of earlier ships were programs SCB-27A and 27C. The SCB-27 modernization was very extensive, requiring some two years for each carrier. To handle the much heavier, faster aircraft of the early jet-era, the flight deck structure was significantly reinforced, able to support aircraft weighing up to 52,000 pounds (23,587 kg), namely the North American AJ Savage. Stronger and larger elevators, much more powerful catapults, and new Mk 5 arresting gear were installed. The original four twin 5-inch/38 gun mounts were removed, clearing the flight deck of guns. The new five-inch gun battery consisted of eight weapons, two on each quarter beside the flight deck. Twin 3-inch/50 gun mounts replaced the 40 mm guns, offering much greater effectiveness through the use of proximity fuzed ammunition. The reconstruction eliminated the difference between "short-hull" and "long-hull" ships; all now had similar clipper bows. New Mark 56 fire-control systems were also added to the ships.

The island was completely redesigned, made taller, but shorter in overall length with the removal of its gun mounts. In addition, the boiler uptakes were rebuilt and angled aft to accommodate a single radar and communications mast atop the island. To better protect aircrews, ready rooms were moved from the gallery deck to below the armored hangar deck, with a large escalator on the starboard side amidships to move flight crews up to the flight deck. Internally, aviation fuel capacity was increased to 300,000 US gallons (1,135,624 L) (a 50% increase) and its pumping capacity enhanced to 50 US gallons (189.3 L) per minute. Fire fighting capabilities were enhanced through the addition of two emergency fire and splinter bulkheads to the hangar deck, a fog/foam firefighting system, improved water curtains and a cupronickel fire main. Also improved were electrical generating power, and weapons stowage and handling facilities. All this added considerable weight: displacement increased by some twenty percent. The armor belt was removed and blisters were fitted to the hull sides to compensate, widening waterline beam by 8 to 10 feet (2.4 to 3.0 m). The ships also sat lower in the water, and maximum speed was slightly reduced, to 31 knots (57 km/h; 36 mph).

=== Modification sub-types ===
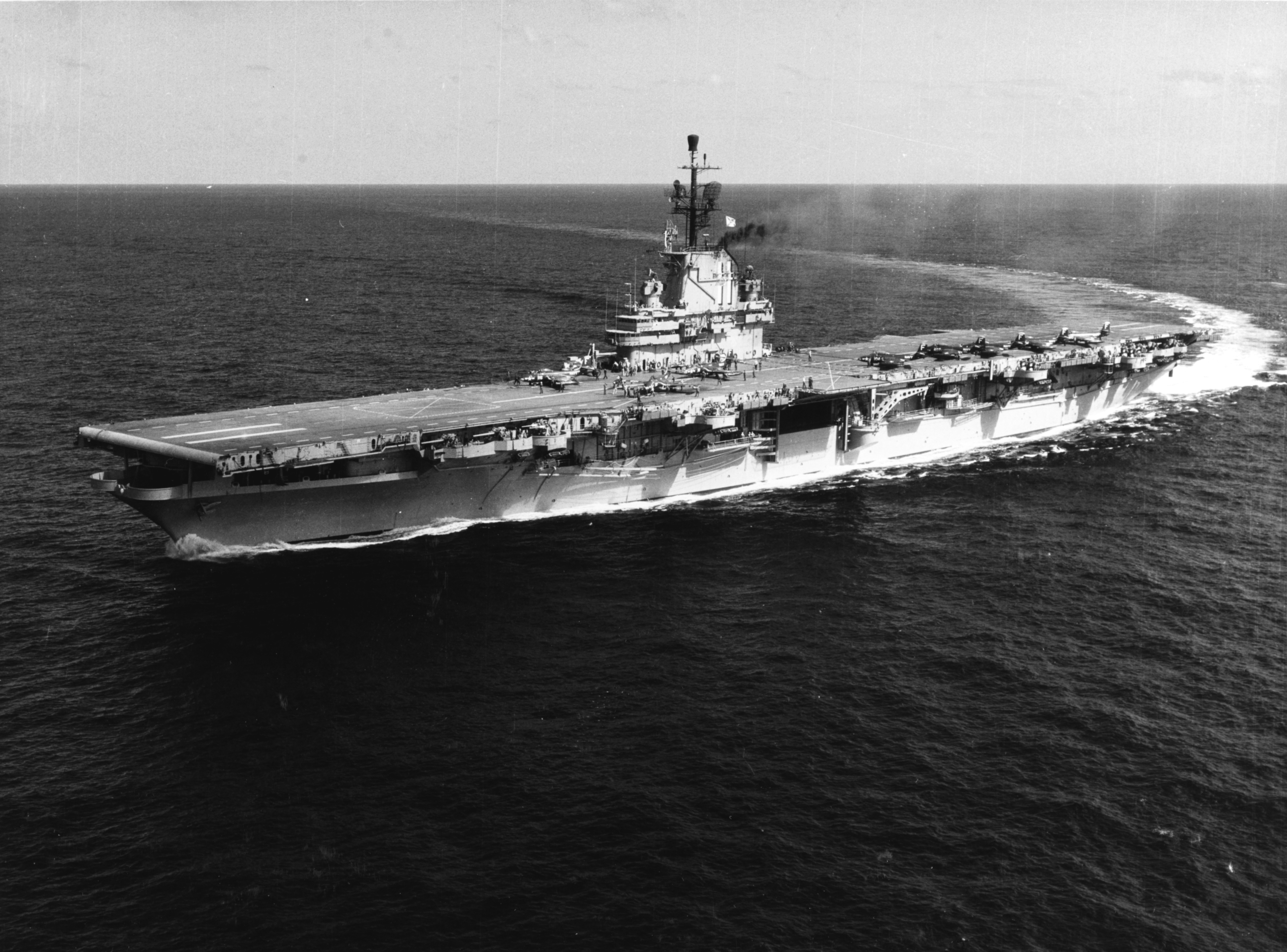
USS Intrepid showing her SCB-27C configuration.

The two sub-types of SCB-27 modifications were primarily a result of changes in catapult technology in the early-1950s. SCB-27A vessels used a pair of H 8 slotted-tube hydraulic catapults, while the later SCB-27C vessels were fitted with a pair of C 11 steam catapults, a British innovation (in fact the first four installed, on Hancock and Ticonderoga, were British-built). To accommodate the catapult machinery, the SCB-27C vessels were slightly heavier (43,060 vice 40,600 tons) and after bulging wider abeam (103 vice 101 feet) than their SCB-27A sisters. Additionally, the SBC-27C carriers were equipped with jet blast deflectors, deck cooling, fuel blending facilities, emergency recovery barrier and storage and handling for nuclear weapons, which was not included in all of the SCB-27A carriers. Under SCB-27C the No. 3 (after) elevator was moved to the starboard deck edge; this elevator was located further aft on the first three SCB-27C ships than it was on the ships which received it concomitantly with an angled flight deck under the SCB-125 program. Oriskany, having been the prototype for the 27A program, was overhauled again to 27C standard in 1957-59, concomitant with 125.

The greater capacity of steam catapults meant that the 27C ships were able to serve as attack carriers through the Vietnam era while their hydraulic-equipped 27A sisters were relegated to antisubmarine duties.

== Program history ==
Ship	Program	Shipyard	Work Began	Recommissioned	Decommissioned
USS Oriskany (CV-34)	SCB-27	New York	Aug 1947	Sep 1950	September 1976
USS Essex (CV-9)	SCB-27A	Puget Sound	Feb 1949	Jan 1951	June 1969
USS Wasp (CV-18)	SCB-27A	New York	May 1949	Sep 1951	July 1972
USS Kearsarge (CV-33)	SCB-27A	Puget Sound	Feb 1950	Feb 1952	February 1970
USS Lake Champlain (CV-39)	SCB-27A	Newport News	Aug 1950	Sep 1952	May 1966
USS Bennington (CV-20)	SCB-27A	New York	Dec 1950	Nov 1952	January 1970
USS Yorktown (CV-10)	SCB-27A	Puget Sound	Mar 1951	Feb 1953	June 1970
USS Randolph (CV-15)	SCB-27A	Newport News	June 1951	Jul 1953	February 1969
USS Hornet (CV-12)	SCB-27A	New York	July 1951	Sep 1953	June 1970
USS Hancock (CV-19)	SCB-27C	Puget Sound	Dec 1951	Feb 1954	January 1976
USS Intrepid (CV-11)	SCB-27C	Newport News	Apr 1952	Jun 1954	Mar 1974
USS Ticonderoga (CV-14)	SCB-27C	New York	Apr 1952	Sep 1954	September 1973
USS Shangri-La (CV-38)	SCB-27C/125	Puget Sound	Oct 1952	Jan 1955	July 1971
USS Lexington (CV-16)	SCB-27C/125	Puget Sound	Sep 1953	Aug 1955	November 1991
USS Bon Homme Richard (CV-31)	SCB-27C/125	Hunters Point	May 1953	Sep 1955	2 July 1971
