= Medal of Military Valour (disambiguation) =

The Medal of Military Valour may refer to:

- Medal of Military Valor of Italy
- Medal of Military Valour of Canada
- Medal of Military Valor (Uruguay)
- Medal of Valor (Israel)
- Armed Forces of the Philippines Medal of Valor
- List of medals for bravery lists awards with similar names

== See also ==
- Cross of Valour (disambiguation)
- Star of Military Valour
