= CV10 =

CV10 or variation, may refer to:

- USS Yorktown (CV-10), a U.S. Navy Essex-class aircraft carrier
- Autovía CV-10 (motorway CV-10), a Spanish highway in Valencia
- CV10 postcode (UK); see CV postcode area
- Toyota Camry CV10

== See also ==
- CVX (disambiguation)
- CV (disambiguation)
