= USS Lake Champlain (CV-39) =

Essex-class aircraft carrier of the US Navy

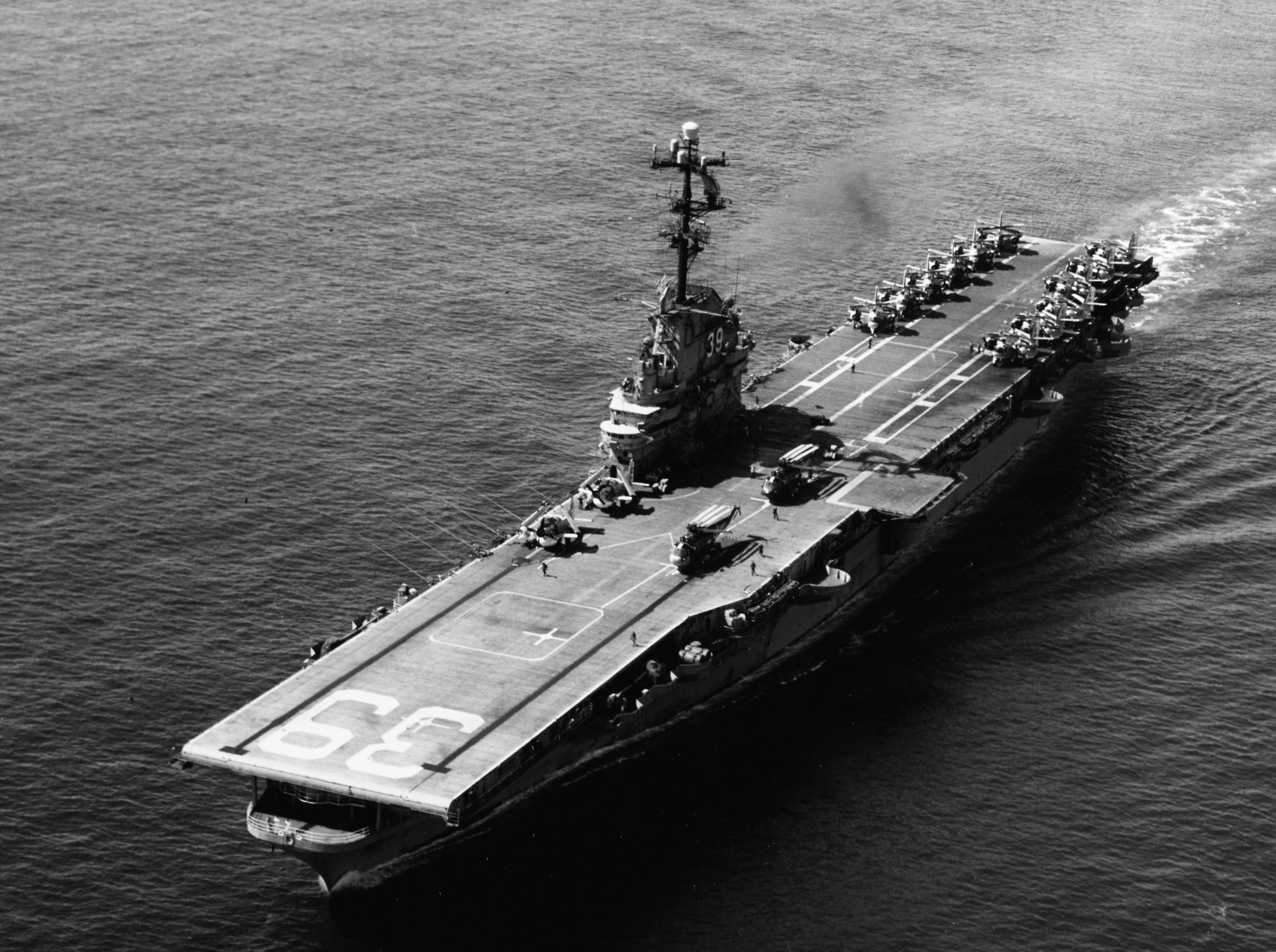
- USS Lake Champlain on exercises in early 1965

History

United States
- Name: Lake Champlain
- Namesake: Battle of Lake Champlain
- Ordered: 7 August 1942
- Builder: Norfolk Navy Yard
- Laid down: 15 March 1943
- Launched: 2 November 1944
- Commissioned: 3 June 1945
- Decommissioned: 17 February 1947
- Recommissioned: 19 September 1952
- Decommissioned: 2 May 1966
- Reclassified: CVA-39, 1 October 1952; CVS-39, 1 August 1957
- Stricken: 1 December 1969
- Fate: Scrapped, 28 April 1972

General characteristics
- Class & type: Essex-class aircraft carrier
- Displacement: 27,100 long tons (27,500 t) standard
- Length: 888 feet (271 m) overall
- Beam: 93 feet (28 m)
- Draft: 28 feet 7 inches (8.71 m)
- Installed power: 8 × boilers; 150,000 shp (110 MW)
- Propulsion: 4 × geared steam turbines; 4 × shafts
- Speed: 33 knots (61 km/h; 38 mph)
- Complement: 3448 officers and enlisted
- Armament: 12 × 5 inch (127 mm)/38 caliber guns; 32 × Bofors 40 mm guns; 46 × Oerlikon 20 mm cannons
- Armor: Belt: 4 in (102 mm); Hangar deck: 2.5 in (64 mm); Deck: 1.5 in (38 mm); Conning tower: 1.5 inch
- Aircraft carried: 90–100 aircraft

USS Lake Champlain (CV/CVA/CVS-39) was one of 24 Essex-class aircraft carriers completed during or shortly after World War II for the United States Navy. She was the second US Navy ship to bear the name, named for the Battle of Lake Champlain in the War of 1812.

Commissioned on 3 June 1945, Lake Champlain did not participate in World War II combat operations. She served as a transport, bringing troops home from Europe as part of Operation Magic Carpet. Like many of her sister ships, she was decommissioned shortly after the war but was modernized and recommissioned in the early 1950s. Redesignated as an attack carrier (CVA), she participated in the Korean War before spending the rest of her career in the Atlantic, Caribbean, and Mediterranean. In the late 1950s, she was redesignated as an antisubmarine carrier (CVS).

Lake Champlain was the prime recovery ship for the first crewed Project Mercury mission (Freedom 7), the second uncrewed Gemini mission (Gemini 2), and the third crewed Gemini mission (Gemini 5).

Lake Champlain had a unique modernization history. She was the only Essex-class ship to receive the SCB-27A modernization program conversion, which involved a rebuild of the superstructure, flight deck, and other features, but did not also receive the SCB-125 conversion for an angled flight deck and hurricane bow. Therefore, she was the last operational US aircraft carrier with an axial flight deck.

Lake Champlain was decommissioned in 1966 and sold for scrap in 1972.

== Construction and commissioning ==
Lake Champlain was one of the "long-hull" Essex-class ships. Her laid down took place in Drydock No. 8 at the Norfolk Navy Yard, Portsmouth, Virginia, on 15 March 1943. The hull was launched from drydock on 2 November 1944. Lake Champlain was commissioned on 3 June 1945 under the command of Captain Logan Ramsey. The ship was sponsored by Mrs. Mildred Lucas, wife of Senator Warren Austin of Vermont.

== Service history ==
=== Operation Magic Carpet ===
After shakedown and visits to New York and Philadelphia, Lake Champlain was assigned to "Magic Carpet" duty to repatriate US military personnel. She departed Norfolk for England on 14 October, arriving at Southampton on the 19th to embark veterans and return them to New York.

She set a speed record for crossing the Atlantic on 26 November 1945, averaging 32.048 kn on a run from Gibraltar to Norfolk, a distance of 3,360.3 nautical miles, completed in 4 days, 8 hours, 51 minutes. This record stood until surpassed by SS United States in the summer of 1952.

Lake Champlain was laid up in the reserve fleet at Norfolk on 17 February 1947.

=== Korean War ===
Lake Champlain was recalled to service for the Korean War. In August 1950, she began her SCB-27A modernization program modernization at Newport News Shipbuilding and Drydock Company. She recommissioned on 19 September 1952.

A shakedown cruise in Cuban and Haitian waters lasted from 25 November to 25 December 1952. The carrier departed Mayport, Florida, for Korea on 26 April 1953 via the Red Sea, Indian Ocean, and South China Sea. Lake Champlain became the largest ship to date to transit the Suez Canal. She moored at Yokosuka, Japan, on 9 June 1953.

As flagship of Carrier Task Force 77 (TF 77), she sailed from Yokosuka on 11 June and arrived off western Korea on 14 June. The carrier's air group immediately launched sorties to crater runways; assault enemy troops; attack trenches, bunkers, and gun positions; and provide close air support to ground forces. Her planes also escorted B-29 Superfortress heavy bombers. Lake Champlain continued strikes until the truce was signed on 27 July. Relieved by Kearsarge on 11 October, Lake Champlain headed toward the South China Sea, arriving in Singapore on 24 October. Departing the Pacific on 27 October, she steamed toward home, calling at Colombo, Port Said, Cannes, and Lisbon before arriving at Mayport, Florida, on 4 December 1953.

=== Postwar years ===
==== NATO, Middle East and reclassification ====
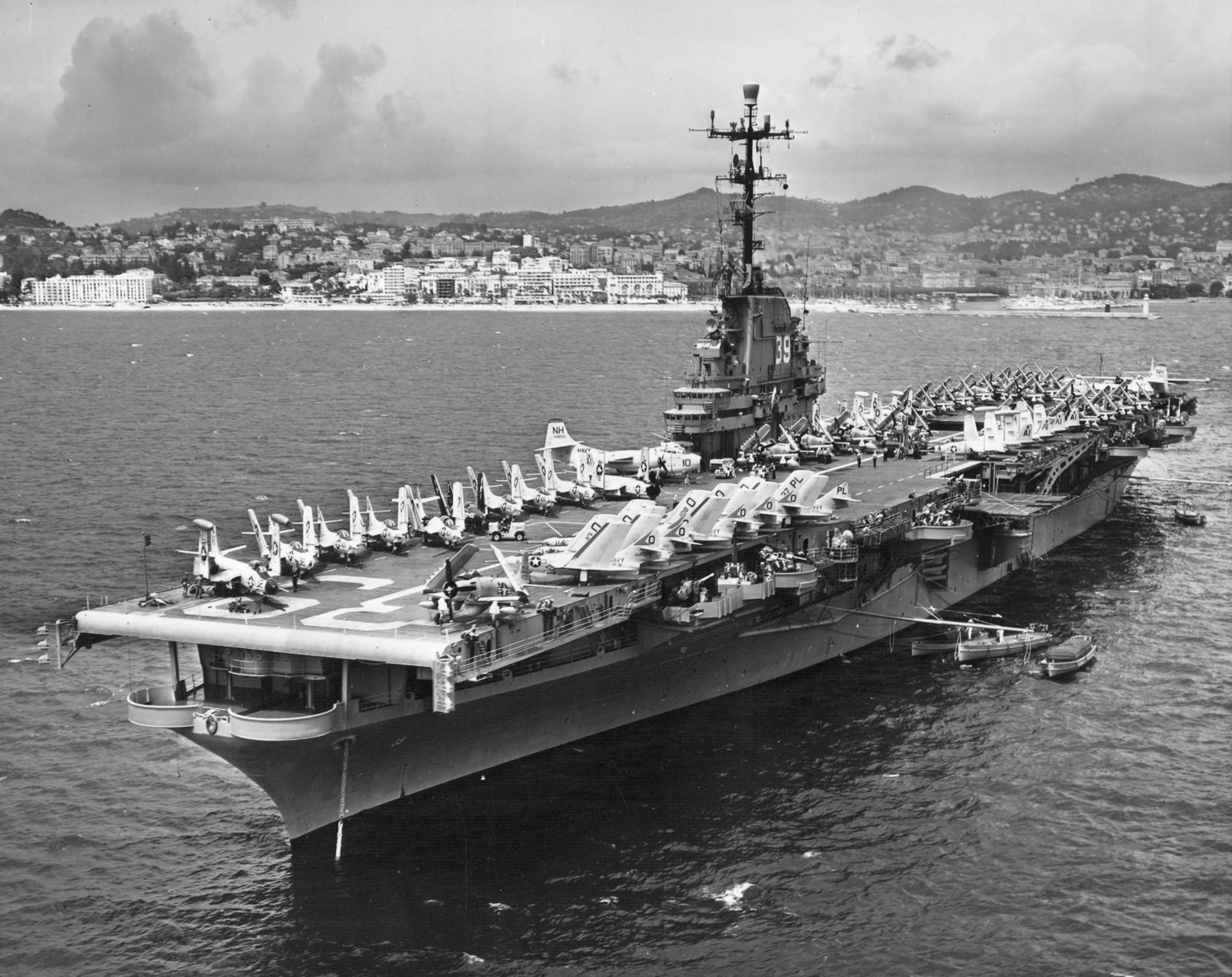
Lake Champlain off Cannes on 19 June 1957

In the following years, Lake Champlain made several cruises to the Mediterranean, participating with NATO forces. On 25 April 1957, in response to tensions in Jordan (see 1957 alleged Jordanian military coup attempt), she joined fleet elements in a high-speed run to the vicinity of Lebanon, supporting King Hussein. The tensions eased and Lake Champlain returned to Mayport on 27 July. A fire claimed the lives of three US sailors and one French dock worker while the Lake Champlain was anchored at Marseille, France on 3 July 1957. Converted to an antisubmarine carrier and reclassified (CVS-39) on 1 August, Lake Champlain trained off the eastern seaboard in her new role.

Lake Champlain was near the island of Mallorca when the Spanish city of Valencia was devastated by the floods on the night of 14 October 1957. The American ambassador to Spain, John Davis Lodge, requested Lake Champlain provide assistance for rescue operations. The ship's Chickasaw helicopters undertook numerous rescue missions, and the ship's crew participated in the relief efforts following the disaster.

She departed Bayonne, New Jersey, on 8 February 1958 for another Mediterranean cruise, returning to Mayport, Florida, on 30 October. After a yard overhaul, she departed for the Mediterranean on 10 June, visiting Spain, Denmark, and Scotland before returning to Mayport on 9 August.

The carrier operated off Florida and in the Caribbean until 15 June 1959, when she sailed on another Mediterranean cruise, returning to her newly assigned home port, Quonset Point, Rhode Island, on 4 September.

The carrier operated out of Quonset Point until 29 June 1960, when she made a midshipmen's cruise to Halifax, Nova Scotia, returning on 12 August. Beginning on 7 February 1961, she made a cruise to the Caribbean, returning on 2 March.

==== Project Mercury ====
Lake Champlain was selected as the prime recovery ship for America's first crewed space flight. She sailed for the recovery area on 1 May 1961 and was on station on 5 May when Commander Alan Shepard was recovered, along with his spacecraft Freedom 7, after splashdown some 300 miles (480 km) downrange from Cape Canaveral. Helicopters from the carrier visually tracked the descent of the capsule and were over it two minutes after splashdown. They recovered Shepard and the Freedom 7 capsule, delivering them safely to Lake Champlain''s flight deck.

During retrieval, the vessel was under the command of then-Captain Ralph Weymouth. There were minor complications in retrieval as the helicopters intended to retrieve Shepard from the craft lacked the explosive squibs required to cut the Mercury craft's radio antenna. The antenna was designed to aid in locating the craft if it landed out of visual range. Had it deployed, it would have complicated retrieving Shepard. Fortunately, the antenna malfunctioned and did not deploy.

==== Caribbean and Cuban blockade ====
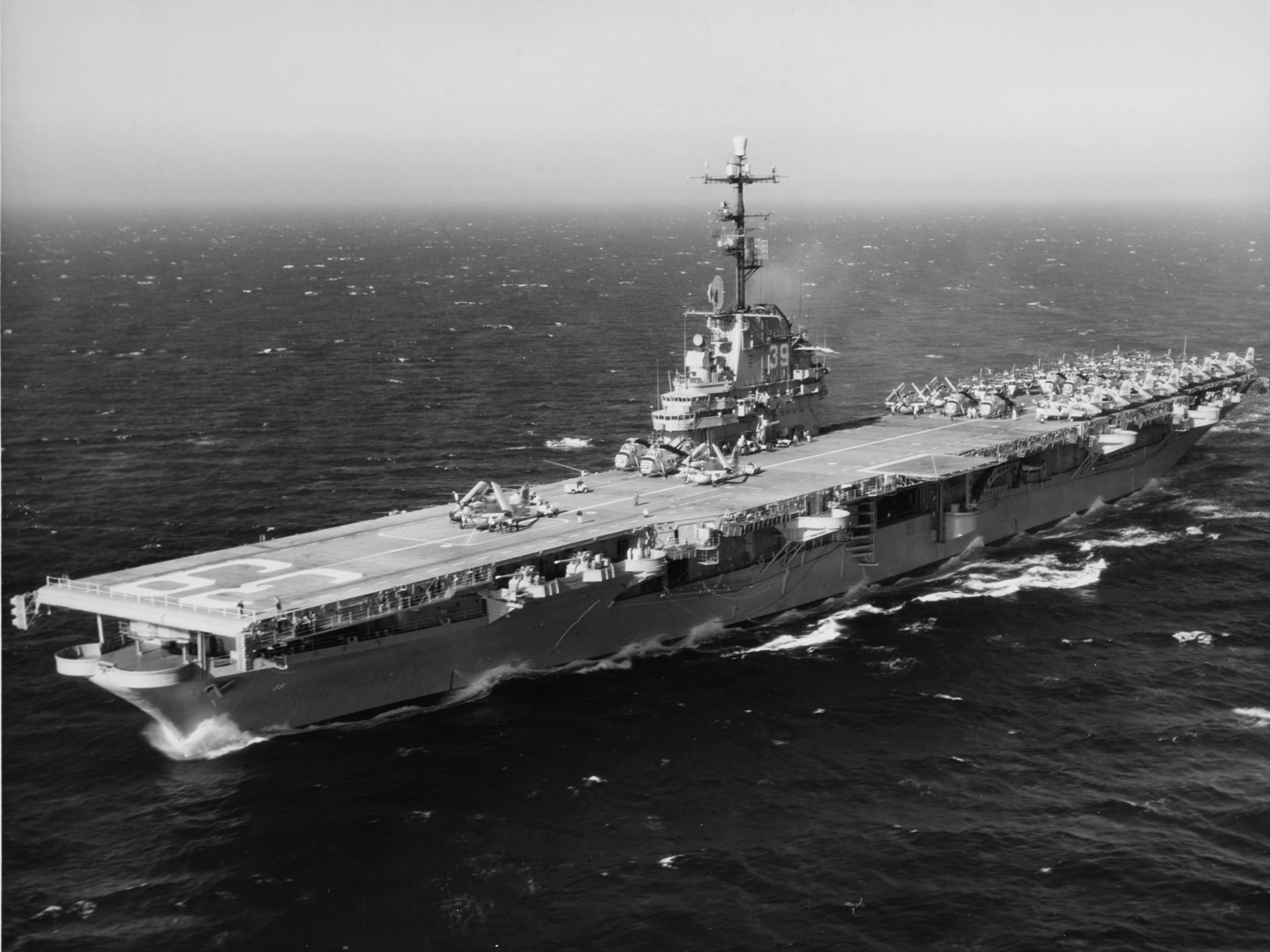
USS Lake Champlain as an anti-submarine carrier in 1960

For the next year, the ship operated along the Atlantic coast and in the Caribbean. In June 1962, she and her escorts embarked First and Third Class Regular NROTC Midshipmen for a summer training cruise from NAS Quonset Point to offshore training areas, Canadian Forces Base Halifax, Naval Station Guantanamo Bay, and Kingston, Jamaica. In Kingston, she represented the US at the island's independence celebration on 3 August. The midshipmen acted as tour guides for visitors aboard and provided an honor guard ashore for then-VP Lyndon Johnson's speech.

On 24 October, Lake Champlain joined in the quarantine of Cuba, where the Soviet Union was constructing bases for offensive missiles. US warships deployed throughout the western Atlantic, interdicting the flow of military supplies to Cuba and enforcing American demands for the withdrawal of the missiles.

After the American demands were substantially complied with, Lake Champlain sailed for home on 23 November via St. Thomas, Virgin Islands, arriving at Quonset Point on 4 December 1962. For the next few months, the carrier conducted operations and underwent overhaul in New England waters. In September 1963, while on a cruise to Guantanamo Bay, her training was interrupted when she was ordered to Haiti to provide relief following Hurricane Flora. Her helicopters located victims and delivered food and medical supplies.

On 6 May 1964, a collision occurred between Lake Champlain and the destroyer Decatur while underway in the Atlantic Ocean. Decatur sustained significant damage to her masts, superstructure, and stacks, and one of the destroyer's crew was injured.

==== North Atlantic and Project Gemini ====
Lake Champlain returned to Quonset Point on 9 November for operations in New England waters. She visited Bermuda briefly in spring 1965 and steamed to Spain in the fall for landings near Huelva. She sailed on 6 November from Barcelona for the United States, stopping at Gibraltar and arriving at Quonset Point on 25 November. The first half of 1965 saw Lake Champlain performing training duties and conducting exercises along the East Coast. On 19 January 1965, she was the recovery ship for the uncrewed Gemini 2 mission. For Fiscal Year 1966, the Navy proposed a modernization program for Lake Champlain. Secretary of Defense Robert McNamara refused to authorize the proposal, citing the limited effectiveness of anti-submarine carriers.

Lake Champlain completed her last major duty on 29 August 1965 when she served as the primary recovery ship for Gemini 5. Shortly afterward, she sailed to the Philadelphia Navy Yard, where she commenced inactivation. She was decommissioned on 2 May 1966 and laid up in the Reserve Fleet.

The Spanish Navy considered acquiring Lake Champlain but instead chose the Independence-class carrier USS Cabot (CVL-28), which was renamed Dédalo.

The 24-year-old Lake Champlain was stricken from the Navy List on 1 December 1969 and sold by the Defense Reutilization and Marketing Service (DRMS) for scrapping on 28 April 1972.

== Awards ==

American Campaign Medal	European–African–Middle Eastern Campaign Medal	World War II Victory Medal
Navy Occupation Service Medal (with Europe clasp)	National Defense Service Medal (twice)	Korean Service Medal (1 battle star)
Armed Forces Expeditionary Medal	United Nations Korean Medal	Republic of Korea War Service Medal (retroactive)

== Gallery ==
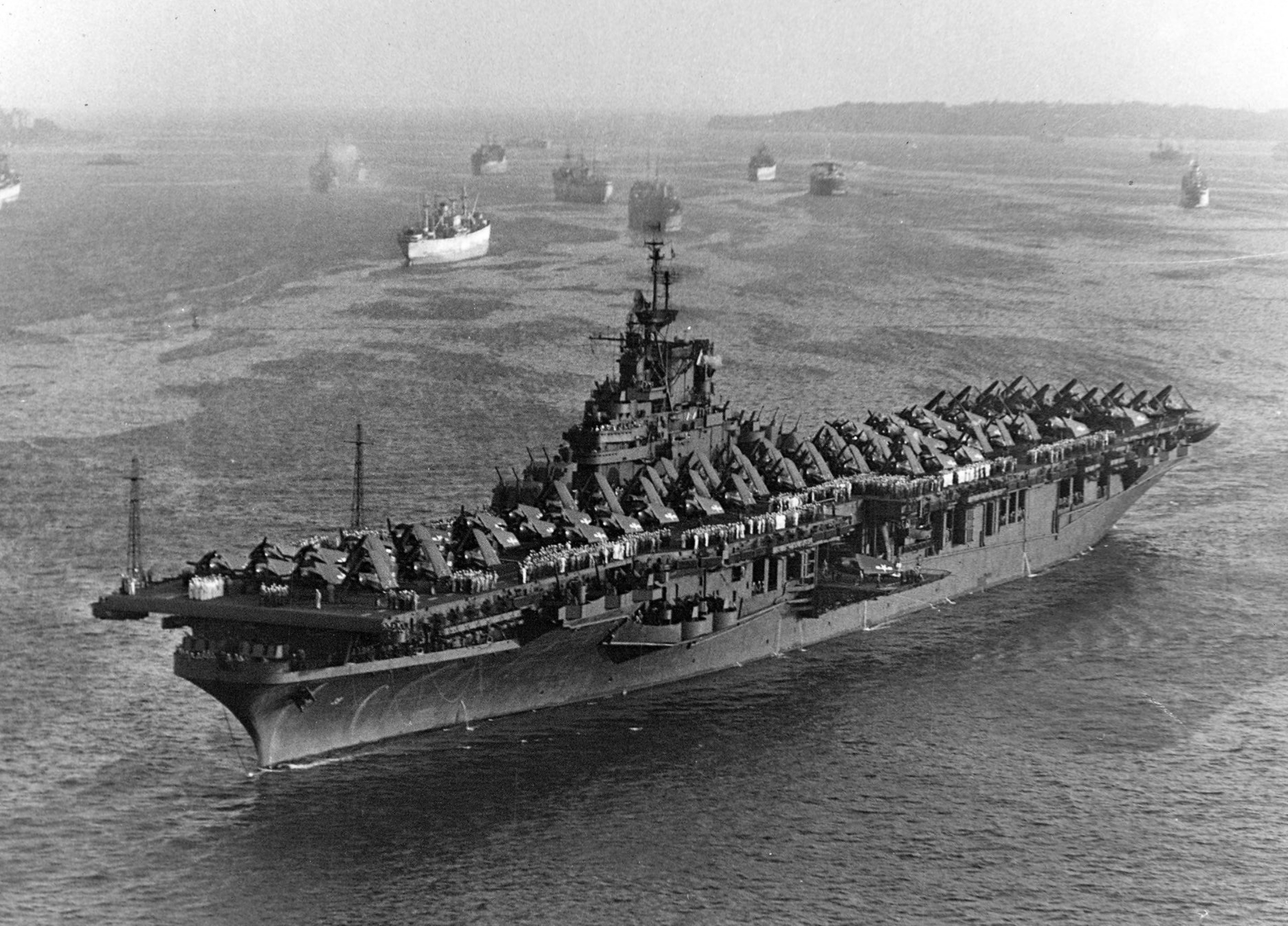
USS Lake Champlain in August 1945

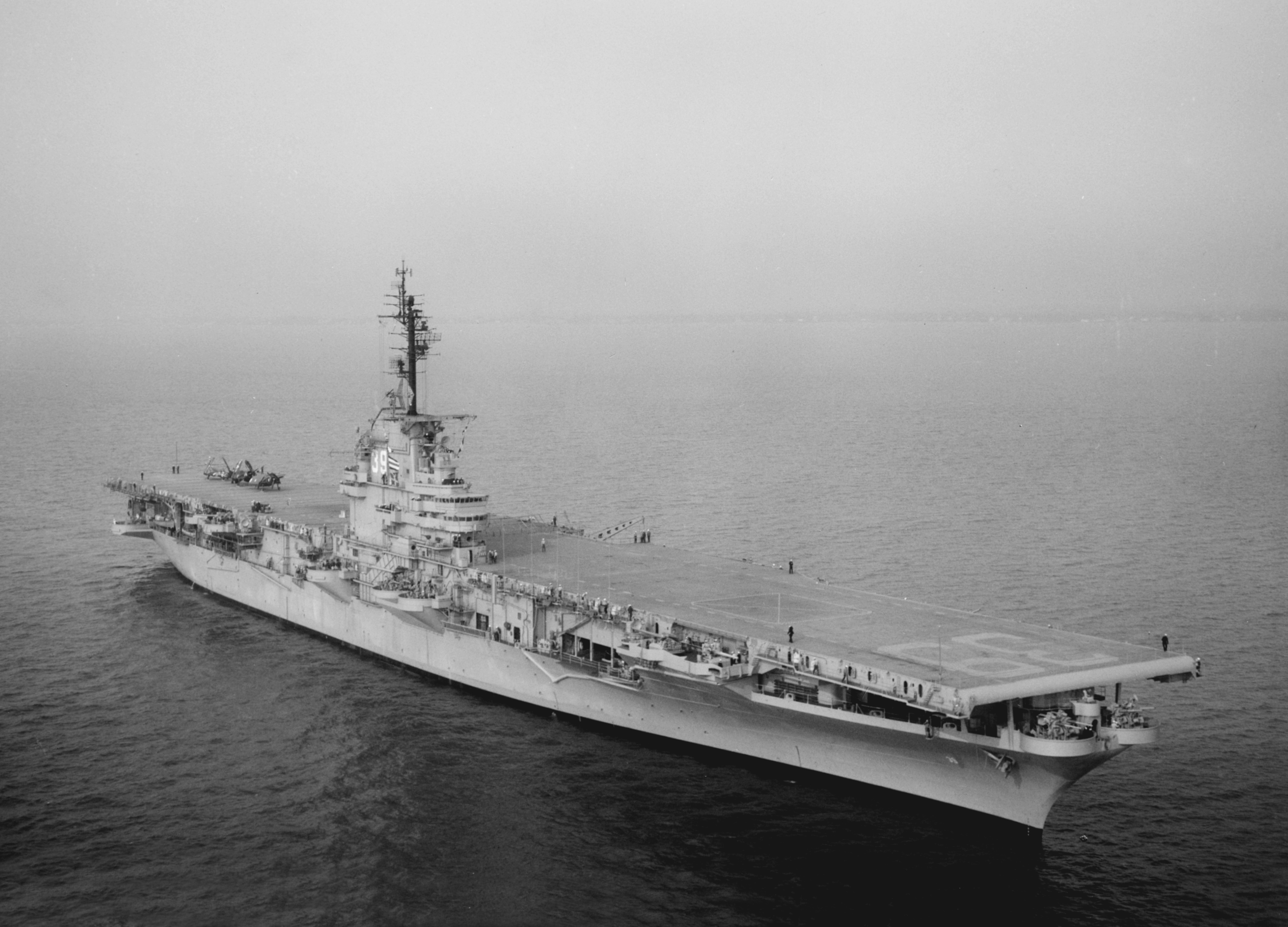
Lake Champlain in November 1952

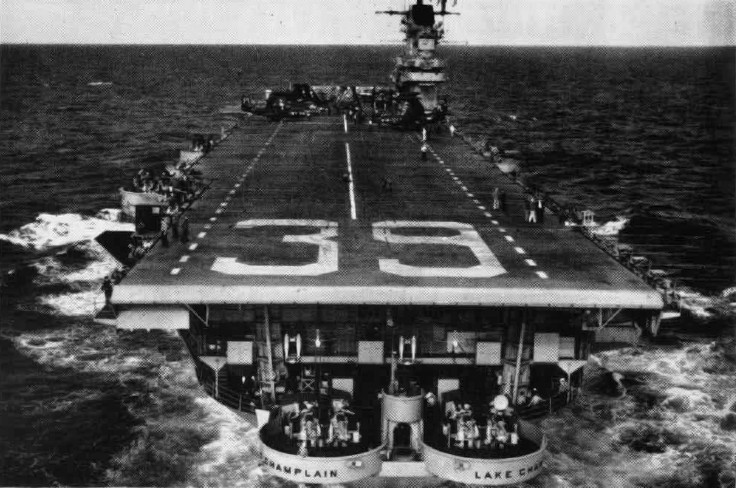
Lake Champlain in 1953

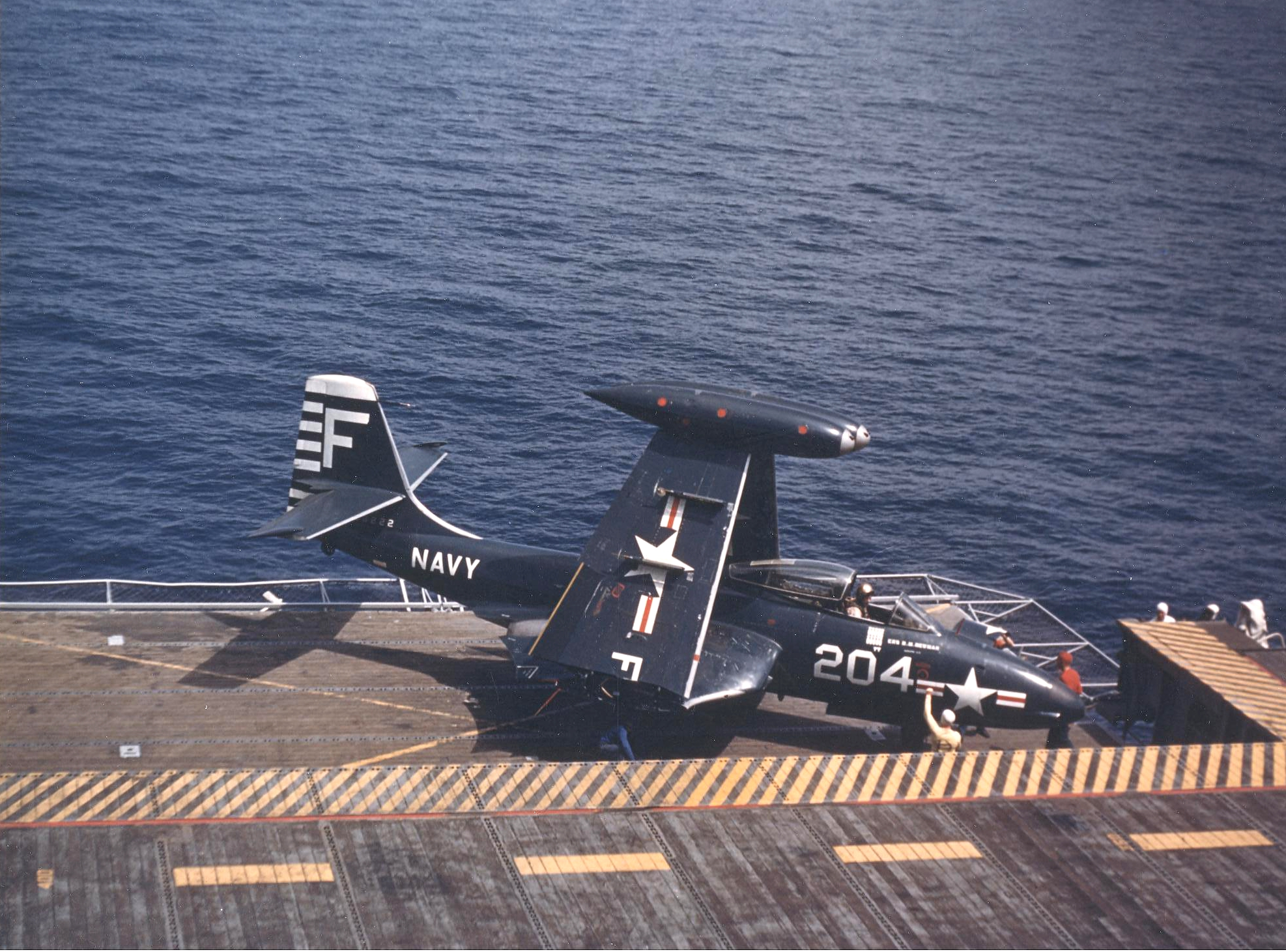
F2H-2 Banshee onboard Lake Champlain in 1953

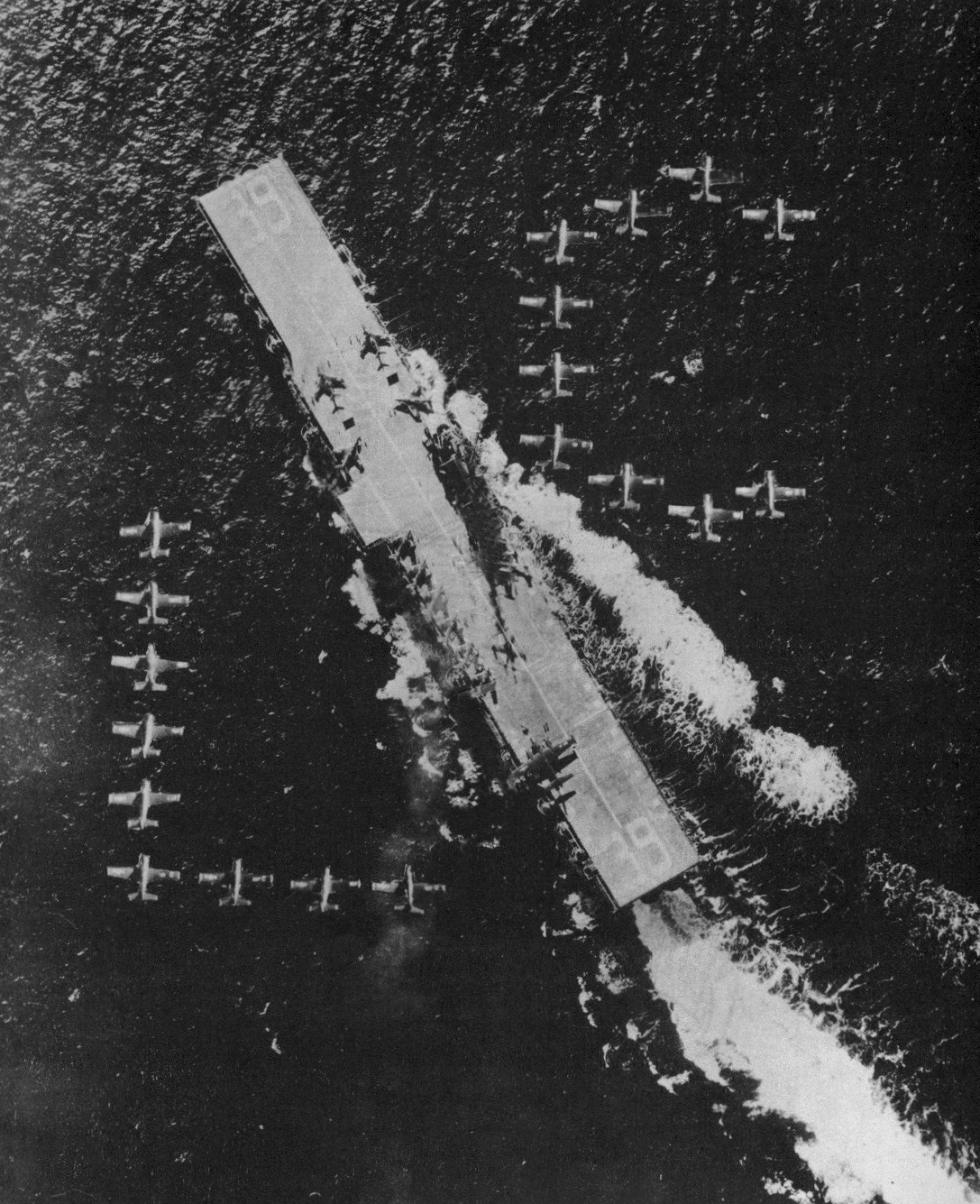
Lake Champlain in 1955

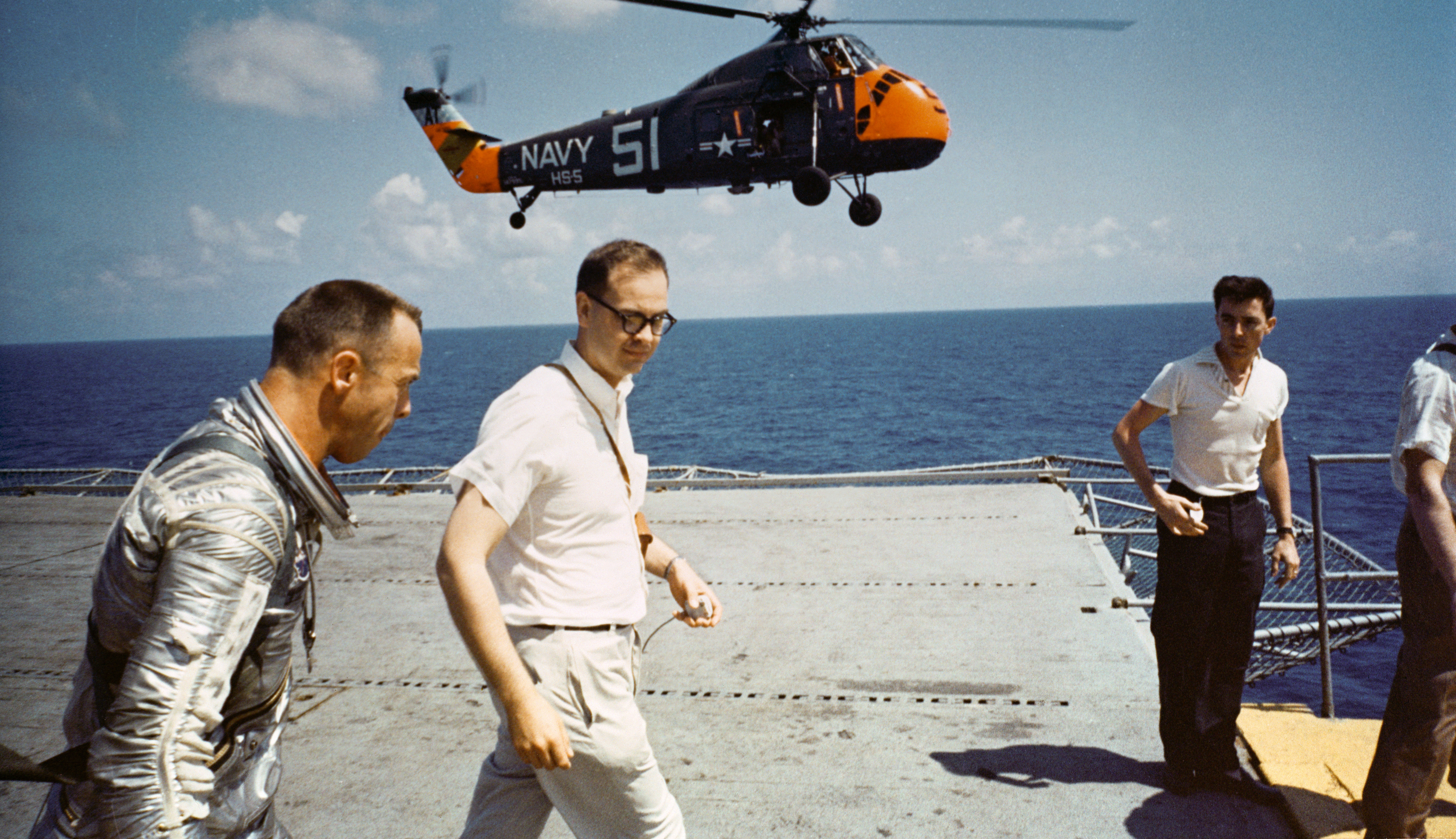
Astronaut Alan B. Shepard onboard Lake Champlain on 5 May 1961

== See also ==
- List of aircraft carriers
