= SCB-125 =

US Navy aircraft carrier upgrade program

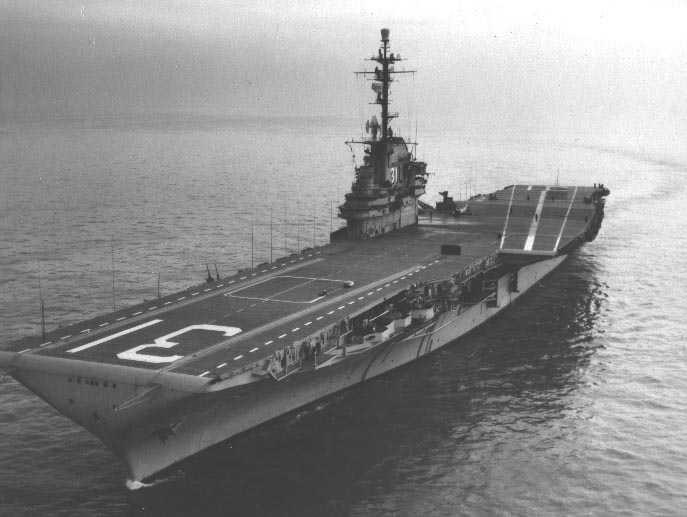
USS Bon Homme Richard displaying the hurricane bow and angled deck of the SCB-125 conversion.

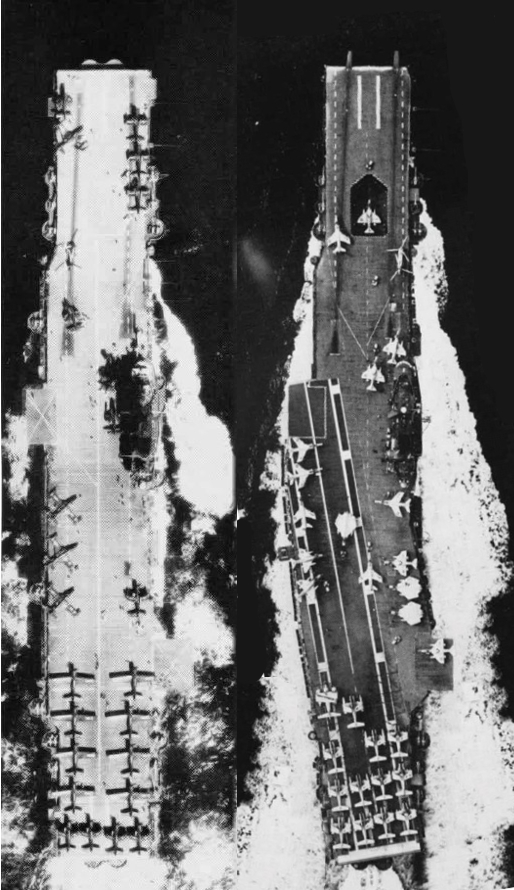
Top views of USS Intrepid after SCB-27C (left) and SCB-125 (right).

SCB-125 was the United States Navy designation for a series of upgrades to the Essex class of aircraft carriers planned by the Ship Characteristics Board and conducted between 1954 and 1959. These upgrades included the addition of an angled flight deck and other enhancements (such as with catapults and elevators) aimed at improving flight operations and seakeeping.

== Principal alterations ==
The SCB-125 modifications included

- Angled flight deck
- Enclosed hurricane bow
- Mirror landing system
- Mark 7 arresting gear
- Primary Flight Control moved to aft end of island
- Air conditioning
- No 1 (forward) elevator lengthened (SCB-27C ships only)
- No 3 (aft) elevator moved from centerline to starboard deck edge (on SCB-27A ships; had been part of SCB-27C refits)

== Program history ==
The SCB-125 upgrade program was first applied to the final three Essex-class carriers to undergo the SCB-27C modernization while they were still in the midst of their original refit. Ultimately every SCB-27 ship would undergo the SCB-125 modification with the exception of Lake Champlain.

Despite the drastic alteration of the carriers' appearance, the SCB-125 refit involved relatively little modification of the ships' existing structure compared to SCB-27, and took around six to nine months as against the approximately two years of the earlier program. The original SCB-27A vessels, which were fitted with a pair of H 8 hydraulic catapults, were not upgraded with the C 11 steam catapults fitted to their SCB-27C sister ships due to machinery space limitations. The SBC-27As also did not receive the enlarged No. 1 (forward) elevator installed in the 27C ships as part of SBC-125.

The first three 27C ships (Hancock, Intrepid and Ticonderoga) had had their No 3 elevators moved from the centerline to the starboard deck edge, in a position relatively far aft. The next three (Shangri-La, Lexington and Bon Homme Richard), which underwent 27C and 125 concurrently, had the elevator relocated to a deck-edge position farther forward, and this location was used for the 27A ships as they in turn underwent SCB-125.

Oriskany, the prototype for the SCB-27 conversion, was the final Essex to undergo SCB-125 conversion and as such, received further enhancements. As a result of the addition of aluminum flight-deck cladding, Mk 7-1 arresting gear and more-powerful C 11-1 steam catapults to the standard SCB-125 modifications, Oriskany alone was referred to as a SCB-125A vessel. These changes also made Oriskany the only SCB-27A vessel to receive steam catapults.

=== Modified vessels ===
Source: www.history.navy.mil

	Program	Shipyard	Work Began	Recommissioned
USS Shangri-La (CVA-38)	SCB-27C/125	Puget Sound	Oct 1952	Jan 1955^{1}
USS Lexington (CV-16)^{2}	SCB-27C/125	Puget Sound	Sep 1953	Aug 1955^{1}
USS Bon Homme Richard (CVA-31)	SCB-27C/125	Hunters Point	May 1953	Sep 1955^{1}
USS Bennington (CVA-20)^{3}	SCB-27A/125	New York	Jun 1954	Apr 1955
USS Yorktown (CVA-10)^{3}	SCB-27A/125	Puget Sound	Mar 1955	Oct 1955
USS Wasp (CVA-18)^{3}	SCB-27A/125	Hunters Point	Mar 1955	Dec 1955
USS Randolph (CVA-15)^{3}	SCB-27A/125	Norfolk	Aug 1955	Feb 1956
USS Essex (CVA-9)^{3}	SCB-27A/125	Puget Sound	Aug 1955	Jan 1956
USS Hornet (CVA-12)^{3}	SCB-27A/125	Puget Sound	Jan 1956	Aug 1956
USS Hancock (CVA-19)	SCB-27C/125	Hunters Point	Apr 1956	Nov 1956
USS Kearsarge (CVA-33)^{3}	SCB-27A/125	Puget Sound	Jul 1956	Jan 1957
USS Ticonderoga (CVA-14)	SCB-27C/125	Norfolk	Aug 1956	Apr 1957
USS Intrepid (CVA-11)	SCB-27C/125	New York	Sep 1956	May 1957
USS Oriskany (CVA-34)	SCB-125A	Hunters Point	Jan 1957	May 1959

^{1} These 3 ships received SCB-27C and SCB-125 at same time; others received SCB-27A/C first and then SCB-125 subsequently

^{2} Lexington was redesignated CVA upon completion of SCB-27C/125

^{3} Ships with SCB-27A received lower power hydraulic catapaults so were relegated to antisubmarine duties later in their careers and redesignated CVS
