= Bored Shorts TV =

YouTube channel

YouTube information
- Channel: Bored Shorts TV
- Genre: Entertainment
- Subscribers
- Website: boredshorts.tv

Bored Shorts TV is a YouTube channel created by brothers Brett, David, John, and Randy Roberts and friend Richard Sharrah and launched on YouTube on March 3, 2011. Bored Shorts TV publish the video series Kid History, Kid Snippets, Autocorrect Awareness, and others. The channel has 508,000 subscribers and over 236 million upload views as of June 2024. The channel is best known for its Kid History series where each episode has a group of children tell a true story from the Roberts brothers' lives. The stories are acted out by the brothers using the voices of the children.

The Roberts brothers grew up making home videos but Kid History—the flagship series on BoredShortsTV—was not created until after their success in a video competition. Randy Roberts developed the concept—a twist on another popular YouTube series "Drunk History"—and enlisted the help of his brothers to create the first episode to enter into the Lingoes Film festival, a small LDS film festival in New York City, which it won gaining 80 percent of the votes. Kid History episodes feature several additional members of the Roberts extended family. Bored Shorts TV does all of its own media production out of their studio in Orem, Utah.

Kid History was followed by other series including: Kid Snippets, Autocorrect Awareness, and Kid Movie Trailers. A new video is produced every Monday. There has been some interest in creating a show with the Kid History creator, and the Roberts brothers have been approached by several TV networks.

Kid Snippets are videos that include adults, but all the adults in the videos are voiced by two children, either male or female. The topic of Kid Snippets is what might happen if people grew up but their minds didn't develop as they mature.

After almost a year's hiatus, BoredShorts returned with 2 new videos at the end of 2017.

After almost another year's hiatus, BoredShorts returned again with a new snippet in September 2018. They haven't posted since.

== CVX Live ==
In 2015, the creators of Bored Shorts TV created a YouTube convention called CVX Live. The convention took place August 7–8 at Utah Valley University and featured 35 different YouTube celebrities with meet & greets, main stage performances, private meet-ups and other activities. Total attendance at the event was 6,112.

The first CVX Live was held on August 7–8, 2015 at the UCCU Center in Orem, Utah The event featured main stage performances and public meet and greets by YouTube creators. The event included the introduction of The Next Big YouTuber contest. The winner of this contest was Madilyn Paige who was previously a finalist on The Voice.
