= Cross of Valour =

The Cross of Valour may refer to one of a number of decorations:

- Cross for Military Valour, a French military award
- Cross of Valour (Australia), Australia's highest civil award
- Cross of Valour (Canada), Canada's highest civil award
- Cross of Valour (Greece) (Αριστείο Ανδρείας), Greece's highest military award
- Cross of Valour (Papua New Guinea), awarded for selfless acts of bravery in times of extreme personal danger
- Cross of Valour (Poland) (Krzyż Walecznych), a Polish military decoration
- Valour Cross (Tapperhedskorset), Denmark's highest military award

== See also ==
- CV (disambiguation)
