= USS Shangri-La =

Essex-class aircraft carrier of the US Navy

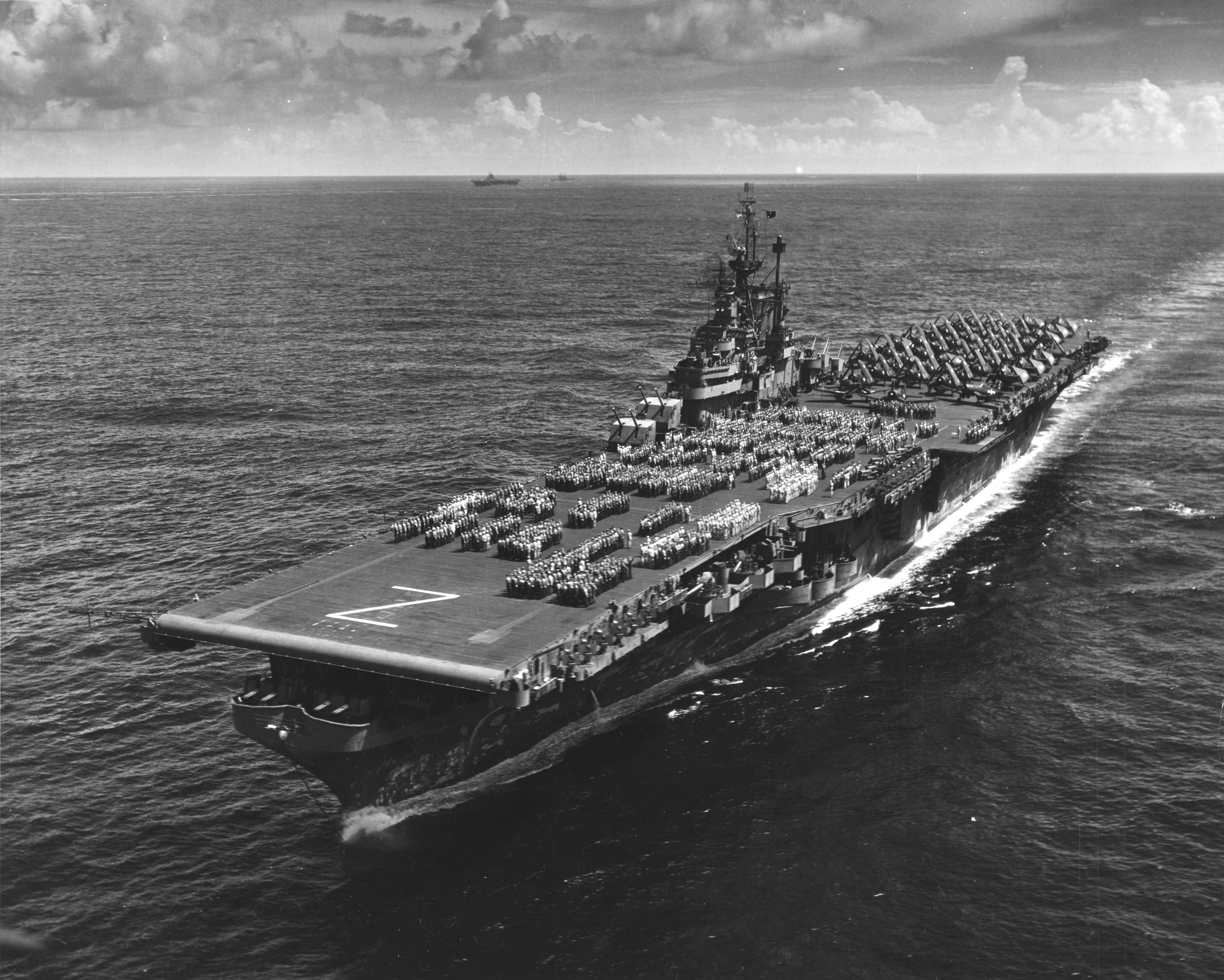
- USS Shangri-La underway with crew on parade, 17 August 1946

History

United States
- Name: Shangri-La
- Namesake: Shangri-La
- Ordered: 7 August 1942
- Builder: Norfolk Naval Shipyard
- Laid down: 15 January 1943
- Launched: 24 February 1944
- Commissioned: 15 September 1944
- Decommissioned: 7 November 1947
- Recommissioned: 10 May 1951
- Decommissioned: 14 November 1952
- Recommissioned: 10 January 1955
- Decommissioned: 30 July 1971
- Reclassified: CVA-38, 1 October 1952; CVS-38, 30 June 1969
- Stricken: 15 July 1982
- Fate: Scrapped, 9 August 1988

General characteristics
- Class & type: Essex-class aircraft carrier
- Displacement: 27,100 long tons (27,500 t) standard
- Length: 888 feet (271 m) overall
- Beam: 93 feet (28 m)
- Draft: 28 feet 7 inches (8.71 m)
- Installed power: 8 × boilers; 150,000 shp (110 MW)
- Propulsion: 4 × geared steam turbines; 4 × shafts
- Speed: 33 knots (61 km/h; 38 mph)
- Complement: 3448 officers and enlisted
- Armament: 12 × 5 inch (127 mm)/38 caliber guns; 32 × Bofors 40 mm guns; 46 × Oerlikon 20 mm cannons
- Armor: Belt: 4 in (102 mm); Hangar deck: 2.5 in (64 mm); Deck: 1.5 in (38 mm); Conning tower: 1.5 inch
- Aircraft carried: 90–100 aircraft

USS Shangri-La (CV/CVA/CVS-38) was one of 24 Essex-class aircraft carriers completed during or shortly after World War II for the United States Navy.

Commissioned in 1944 and named after the mythical paradise of the same name, Shangri-La participated in several campaigns in the Pacific Theater of Operations in World War II, earning two battle stars. Like many of her sister ships, she was decommissioned shortly after the end of the war, but was modernized and recommissioned in the early 1950s, and redesignated as an attack carrier (CVA). She operated in both the Pacific and Atlantic / Mediterranean for several years, and late in her career was redesignated as an antisubmarine carrier (CVS). She earned three battle stars for service in the Vietnam War.

Shangri-La was decommissioned in 1971 and sold for scrap in 1988.

== Name ==
The naming of the ship was a radical departure from the general practice of the time, which was to name aircraft carriers after battles or previous US Navy ships. After the Doolittle Raid, launched from the aircraft carrier Hornet, President Roosevelt answered a reporter's question by saying that the raid had been launched from "Shangri-La", the fictional faraway land of the James Hilton novel Lost Horizon.

== Construction and commissioning ==
Shangri-La was one of the "long-hull" Essex-class ships. She was laid down by the Norfolk Navy Yard, at Portsmouth, Virginia, on 15 January 1943, and was launched on 24 February 1944, sponsored by Josephine Doolittle (wife of Jimmy Doolittle). Shangri-La was commissioned on 15 September 1944.

== Service history ==
=== World War II ===
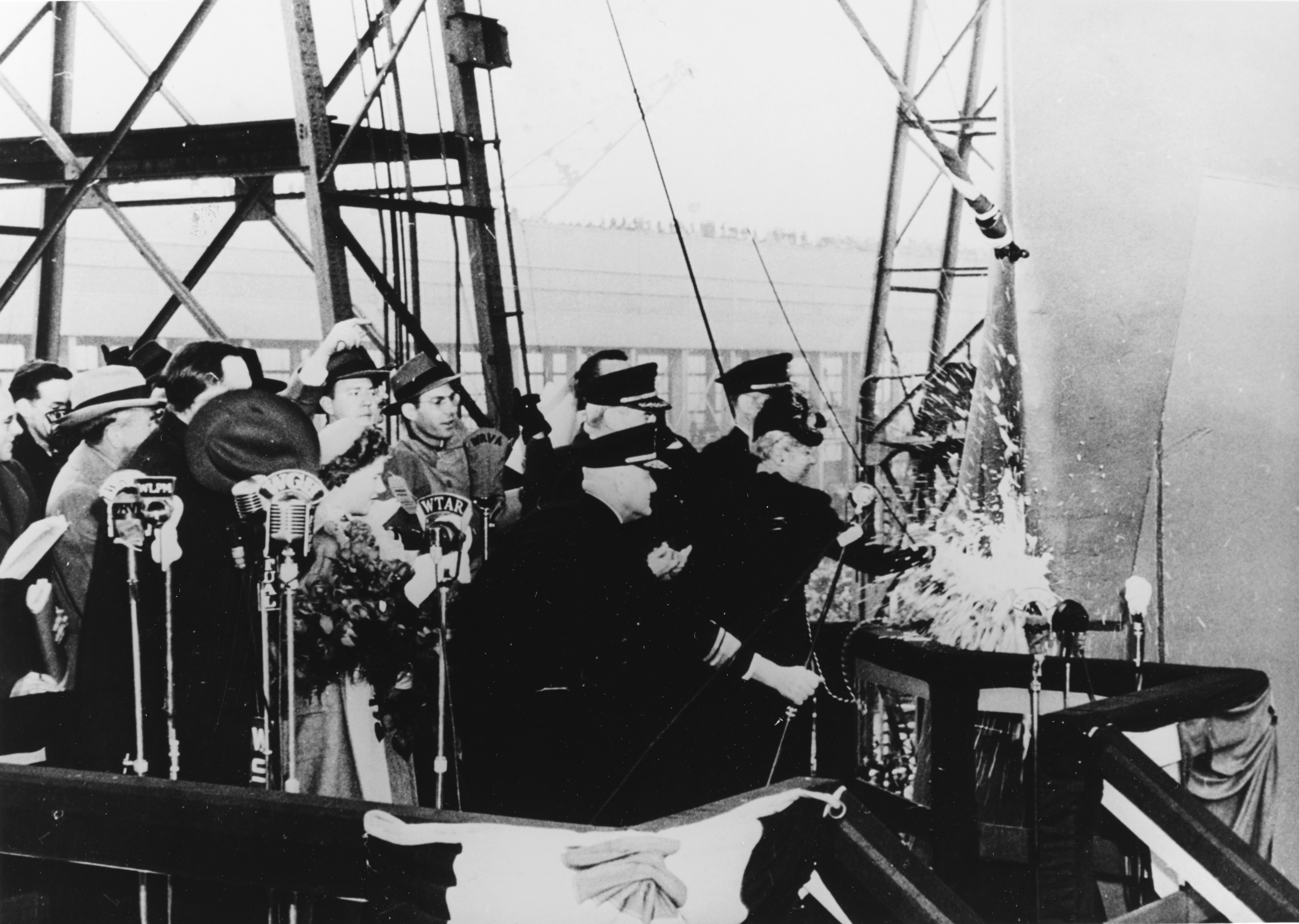
Josephine Doolittle names Shangri-La at the Norfolk Navy Yard, Virginia, 24 February 1944

Shangri-La completed fitting out at Norfolk and took her shakedown cruise to Trinidad, between 15 September and 21 December 1944, at which time she returned to Norfolk. On 17 January 1945, she stood out of Hampton Roads, formed up with large cruiser Guam and destroyer Harry E. Hubbard, and sailed for Panama. The three ships arrived at Cristobal, Panama Canal Zone on 23 January and transited the canal the next day. Shangri-La departed from Balboa on 25 January and arrived at San Diego, California, on 4 February. There she loaded passengers, stores, and extra planes for transit to Hawaii and got underway on 7 February. Upon her arrival at Pearl Harbor on 15 February, she commenced two months of duty, qualifying land-based Navy pilots in carrier landings.

On 10 April, she weighed anchor for Ulithi Atoll, where she arrived 10 days later. After an overnight stay in the lagoon, Shangri-La departed Ulithi in company with destroyers Haggard and Stembel to report for duty with Vice Admiral Marc A. Mitscher's Task Force (TF) 58. On 24 April, she joined Task Group (TG) 58.4, while it was conducting a fueling rendezvous with TG 50.8. The next day, Shangri-La and her air group, CVG-85, launched their first strike against the Japanese. The target was Okino Daito Jima, a group of islands several hundred miles to the southeast of Okinawa. Her planes successfully destroyed radar and radio installations there, and upon their recovery, the TG sailed for Okinawa. Shangri-La supplied combat air patrols for the TG and close air support for the 10th Army on Okinawa before returning to Ulithi on 14 May.

While at Ulithi, Shangri-La became the flagship of Carrier TF 2. Vice Admiral John S. McCain, Sr., hoisted his flag on Shangri-La on 18 May. Six days later, TG 58.4, with Shangri-La in company, sortied from the lagoon. On 28 May, TG 58.4 became TG 38.4 and McCain relieved Mitscher as commander, TF 38, retaining Shangri-La as his flagship. On 2–3 June, the TF launched air strikes on the Japanese home islands – aimed particularly at Kyūshū, the southernmost of the major islands. Facing the stiffest airborne resistance to date, Shangri-La's airmen suffered their heaviest casualties.

On 4–5 June, she moved off to the northwest to avoid a typhoon; then on 6 June, her planes returned to close-air-support duty over Okinawa. On 8 June, her air group hit Kyūshū again, and on the following day, they came back to Okinawa. On 10 June, the TF cleared Okinawa for Leyte, conducting drills en route. Shangri-La entered Leyte Gulf and anchored in San Pedro Bay on 13 June. She remained at anchor there for the rest of June, engaged in upkeep and recreation.

On 1 July, Shangri-La got underway from Leyte to return to the combat zone. On 2 July, the oath of office of Assistant Secretary of the Navy for Air was administered to John L. Sullivan on board Shangri-La, the first ceremony of its type ever undertaken in a combat zone. Eight days later, her air group commenced a series of air strikes against Japan, which lasted until the capitulation on 15 August.

Shangri-La's planes ranged the length of the island chain during these raids. On the 10th, they attacked Tokyo, the first raid there since the strikes of the previous February. On 14–15 July, they pounded Honshū and Hokkaidō, and on 18 July, returned to Tokyo, also taking part in an attack against the battleship Nagato, moored close to shore at Yokosuka. From 20 to 22 July, Shangri-La joined the logistics group for fuel, replacement aircraft, and mail. By 24 July, her pilots were attacking shipping in the vicinity of Kure. They returned the next day for a repeat performance, before departing for a two-day replenishment period on 26–27 July. On the following day, Shangri-La's aircraft damaged light cruiser Ōyodo and battleship Haruna, the latter so badly that she beached and flooded. She later had to be abandoned. They pummeled Tokyo again on 30 July, then cleared the area to replenish on 31 July and 1 August.

Shangri-La spent the next four days in the retirement area waiting for a typhoon to pass. On 9 August, after heavy fog had caused the cancellation of the previous day's missions, the carrier sent her planes aloft to bomb Honshū and Hokkaido once again. The next day, they raided Tokyo and central Honshū, then retired from the area for logistics. She evaded another typhoon on 11–12 August, then hit Tokyo again on 13 August. After replenishing on 14 August, she sent planes to strike the airfields around Tokyo on the morning of 15 August 1945. Soon thereafter, Japan's capitulation was announced; the fleet was ordered to cease hostilities. Shangri-La steamed around in the strike area from 15 to 23 August, patrolling the Honshū area on the latter date. From 23 August to 16 September, her planes sortied on missions of mercy, air-dropping supplies to Allied prisoners of war in Japan.

Shangri-La entered Tokyo Bay on 16 September, almost two weeks after the surrender ceremony onboard battleship Missouri, and remained there until 1 October. Departing Japan, she arrived at Okinawa on 4 October, staying until 6 October, and then headed for the United States in company with Task Unit 38.1.1. She sailed into San Pedro Bay on 21 October and stayed at Long Beach for three weeks. On 5 November, she shifted to San Diego, departing that port a month later for Bremerton, Washington. She entered Puget Sound on 9 December, underwent availability until 30 December, and then returned to San Diego.

=== After the war ===
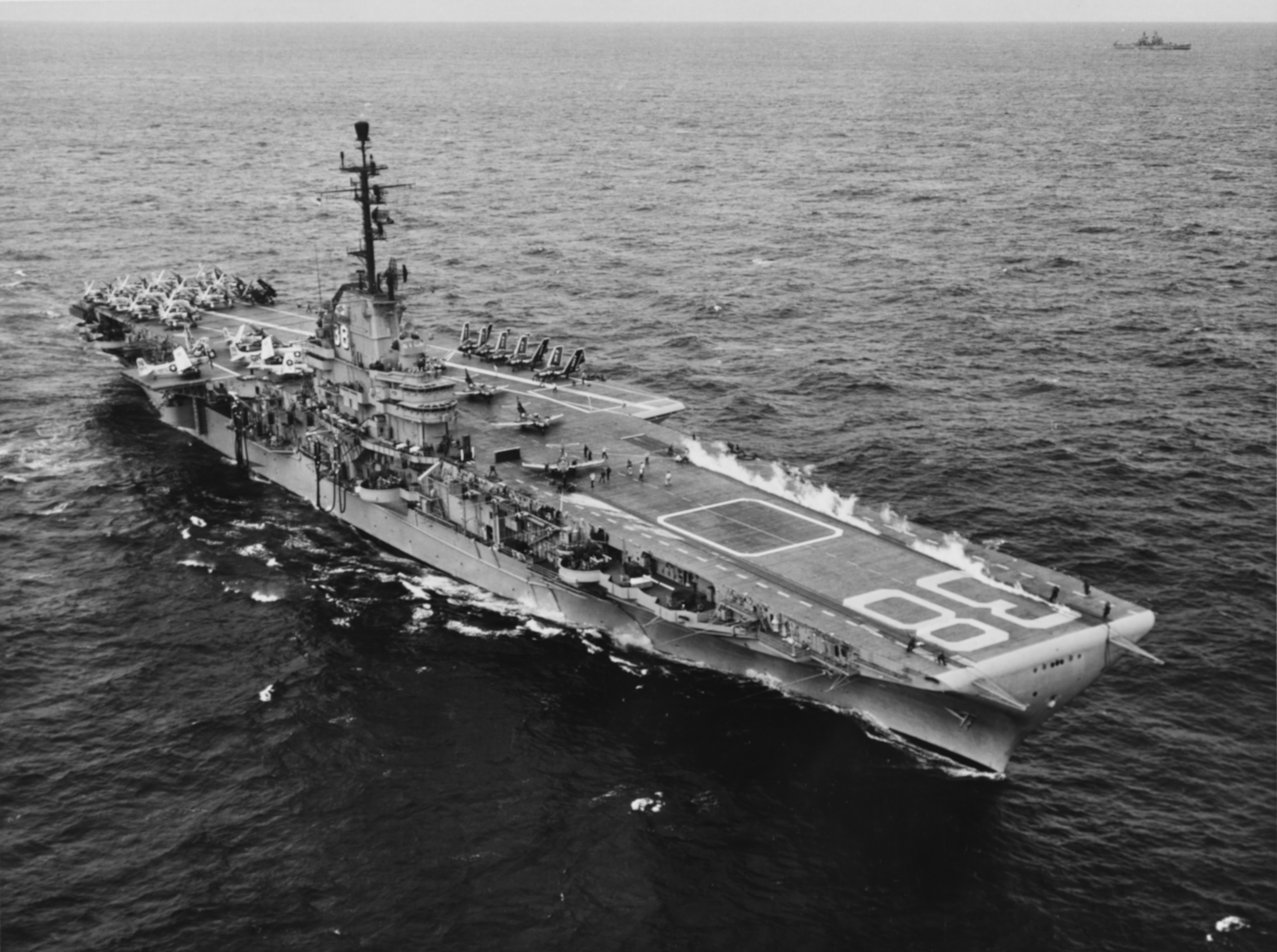
Shangri-La after her SCB-125 refit in 1956

Upon her return, Shangri-La began normal operations out of San Diego, primarily engaged in pilot carrier-landing qualifications. In May 1946, she sailed for the Central Pacific to participate in Operation Crossroads, the atomic bomb tests conducted at Bikini Atoll. Following this, she made a brief training cruise to Pearl Harbor, then wintered at Puget Sound Naval Shipyard. In March 1947, she deployed again, calling at Pearl Harbor and Sydney, Australia. When she returned to the United States, Shangri-La was decommissioned and placed in the Reserve Fleet at San Francisco on 7 November 1947.

Shangri-La recommissioned on 10 May 1951, Captain Francis L. Busey in command. For the next year, she conducted training and readiness operations out of Boston, Massachusetts. Reclassified as an attack carrier (CVA-38) in 1952, she returned to Puget Sound that fall and decommissioned again on 14 November, this time for modernization at Puget Sound Naval Shipyard. During the next two years, she received an angled flight deck and twin steam catapults, and her aircraft elevators and arresting gear were overhauled. At a cost around $7 million, she was virtually a new ship when she commissioned for the third time on 10 January 1955, Captain Roscoe L. Newman commanding; she was the second (after USS Antietam (CVA-36)) operational U.S. carrier with an angled flight deck. She conducted intensive fleet training for the remainder of 1955, then deployed to the Far East on 5 January 1956. Until 1960, she alternated western Pacific cruises with operations out of San Diego. On 16 March 1960, she put to sea from San Diego en route to her new home port, Mayport, Florida. She entered Mayport after visits to Callao, Peru; Valparaíso, Chile; Port of Spain, Trinidad; Bayonne, New Jersey; and Norfolk, Virginia.

After six weeks of underway training in the local operating area around Guantánamo Bay, Cuba, she embarked upon her first Atlantic deployment, a NATO exercise followed by liberty in Southampton, England. Almost immediately after her return to Mayport, Shangri-La was ordered back to sea—this time to the Caribbean in response to trouble in Guatemala and Nicaragua. She returned to Mayport on 25 November and remained in port for more than two months.

Between 1961 and 1970, Shangri-La alternated between deployments to the Mediterranean and operations in the western Atlantic, out of Mayport. She sailed east for her first tour of duty with the Sixth Fleet on 2 February 1961. She returned to the United States that fall and entered the New York Naval Shipyard. Back in Mayport by the beginning of 1962, Shangri-La stood out again for the Mediterranean on 7 February. After about six months of cruising with the Sixth Fleet, she departed the Mediterranean in mid-August and arrived in Mayport on 28 August.

Following a month's stay at her home port, the aircraft carrier headed for New York and a major overhaul. Shangri-La was modified extensively during her stay in the yard. Four of her 5 in (127 mm) mounts were removed, but she received a new air-search and height-finding radar and a new arrester system. In addition, much of her electrical and engineering equipment was renovated. After sea trials and visits to Bayonne and Norfolk, Shangri-La returned to Mayport for a week in late March 1963, then put to sea for operations in the Caribbean. Eight months of similar duty followed before Shangri-La weighed anchor for another deployment. On 1 October 1963, she headed back to the Sixth Fleet for a seven-month tour.

=== Vietnam War ===
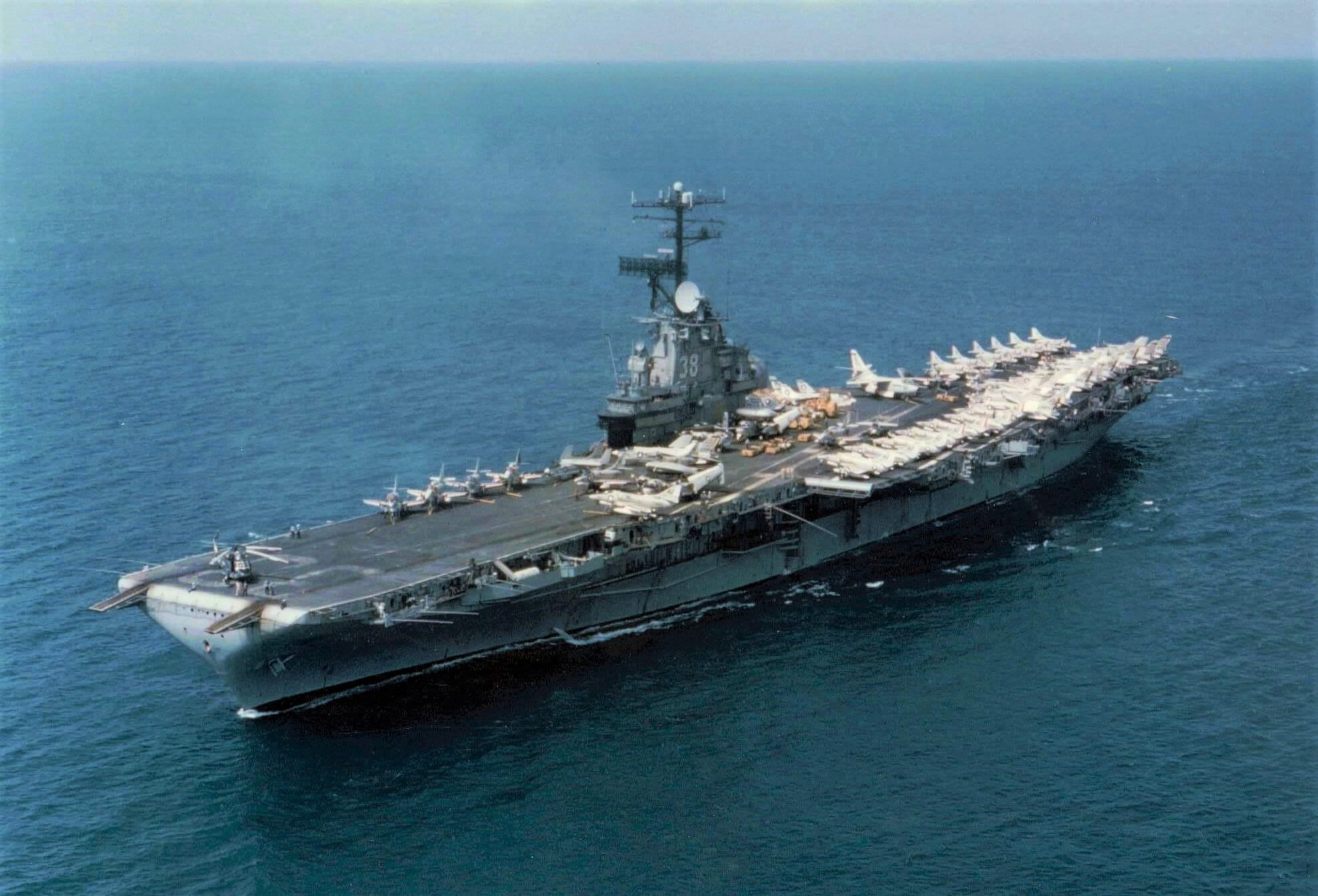
Shangri-La in 1970 on her last deployment

Shangri-La continued her United States Second Fleet and Sixth Fleet assignments for the next six years. From 15 February 1965 to 20 September 1965, she made a Mediterranean deployment with Carrier Air Wing 10 embarked.

In the fall of 1965, Shangri-La collided with the destroyer Newman K. Perry off Sardinia. Shangri-La was struck below the waterline, breaching the hull. On the destroyer, one man was killed and another injured. The ship itself suffered a bent hull. No casualties occurred on the carrier and the hole was quickly patched at sea by the crew of the tender ship Shenandoah. As a result of this incident, Shangri-La underwent an extensive overhaul during the winter of 1965 and spring of 1966, this time at Philadelphia, then resumed operations as before. On 30 June 1969, she was redesignated an antisubmarine warfare carrier (CVS-38).

In 1970, Shangri-La returned to the western Pacific after an absence of 10 years. She got underway from Mayport on 5 March, stopped at Rio de Janeiro, Brazil, from 13 to 16 March, and headed east through the Atlantic and Indian Oceans. She arrived in Subic Bay, Philippines, on 4 April, and during the next seven months, operating in the capacity of an attack carrier (CVA), launched combat sorties from Yankee Station. Her tours of duty on Yankee Station were punctuated by frequent logistics trips to Subic Bay, by visits to Manila and Hong Kong, in October, and by 12 days in drydock at Yokosuka, Japan, in July.

On 9 November, Shangri-La stood out of Subic Bay to return home. En route to Mayport, she visited Sydney, Australia; Wellington, New Zealand; and Rio de Janeiro, Brazil. She arrived in Mayport on 16 December and began preparations for inactivation. After inactivation overhaul at the Boston Naval Shipyard, South Annex, Shangri-La decommissioned on 30 July 1971. She was placed in the Atlantic Reserve Fleet and berthed at the Philadelphia Naval Shipyard.

=== Fate ===
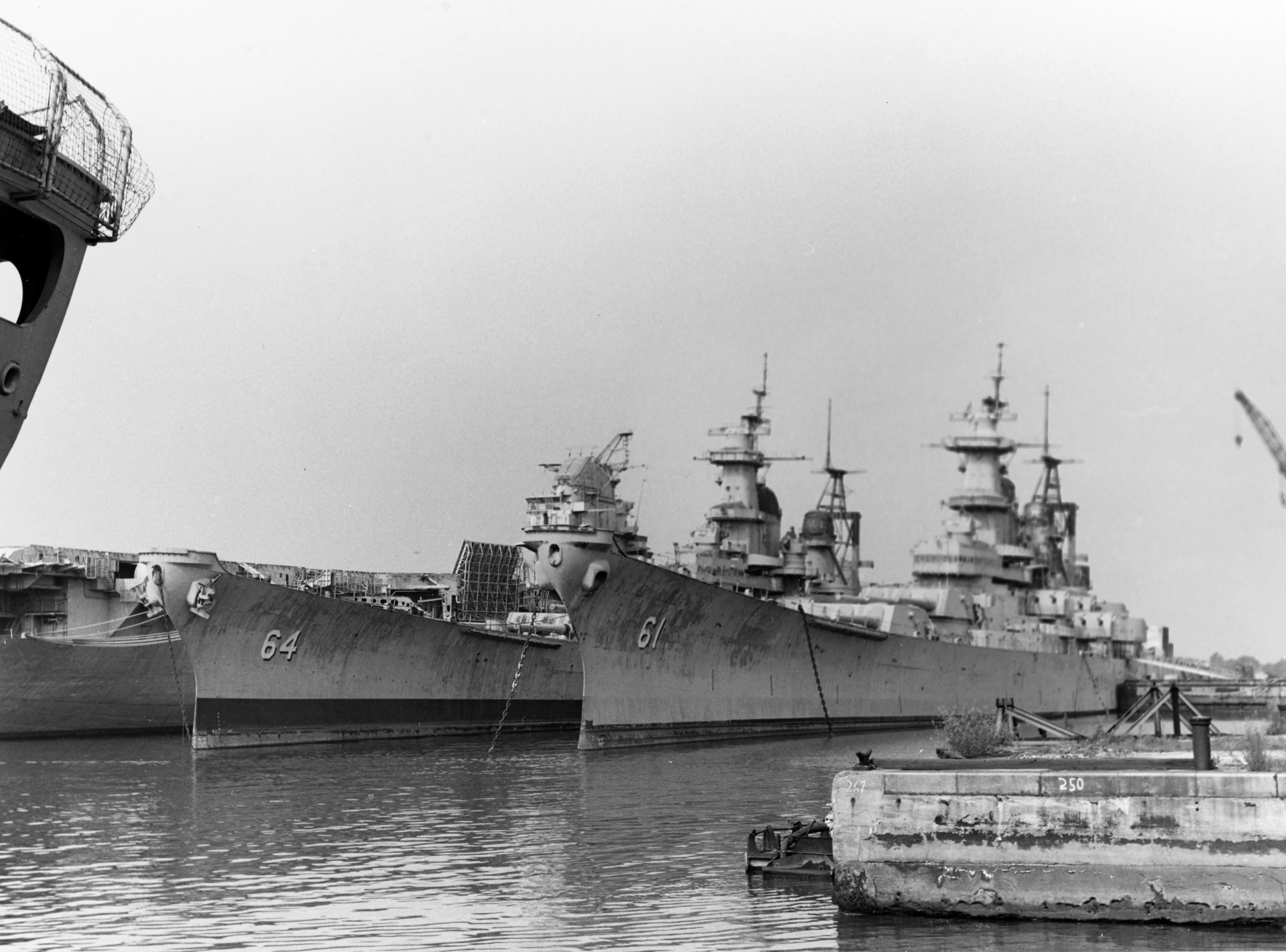
Shangri-La (left), Wisconsin (center), and Iowa mothballed at Philadelphia Naval Shipyard, July 1978

Shangri-La remained in the reserve fleet for the next 11 years and was stricken from the Naval Vessel Register on 15 July 1982. She was retained by MARAD for several years to provide spare parts for the training carrier Lexington. On 9 August 1988, she was sold for scrap and later towed to Kaohsiung, Taiwan, for demolition. The nameplate of Shangri-La has been placed to the left-hand side of the entrance at a steel manufacturing company in Kaohsiung.

One of Shangri-La's four propellers is on display outside Meding's Seafood in Milford, Delaware.

On 6 September 2017, USS Shangri-La's bell was placed on display at the Jacksonville University NROTC Building as a permanent loan. The bell was found by a farmer in his field at Hudson, Florida, in June 2017. He notified the USS Shangri La Reunion Group, who repaired and restored the bell before lending it to the NROTC unit.

== Awards ==
Shangri-La earned two battle stars for World War II service and three battle stars for service in the Vietnam War.

Navy Meritorious Unit Commendation		Navy Expeditionary Medal
American Campaign Medal	Asiatic-Pacific Campaign Medal (2 battle stars )	World War II Victory Medal
Navy Occupation Medal (with Asia clasp)	China Service Medal (extended)	National Defense Service Medal (twice)
Armed Forces Expeditionary Medal	Vietnam Service Medal (3 battle stars)	Republic of Vietnam Campaign Medal

== Gallery ==
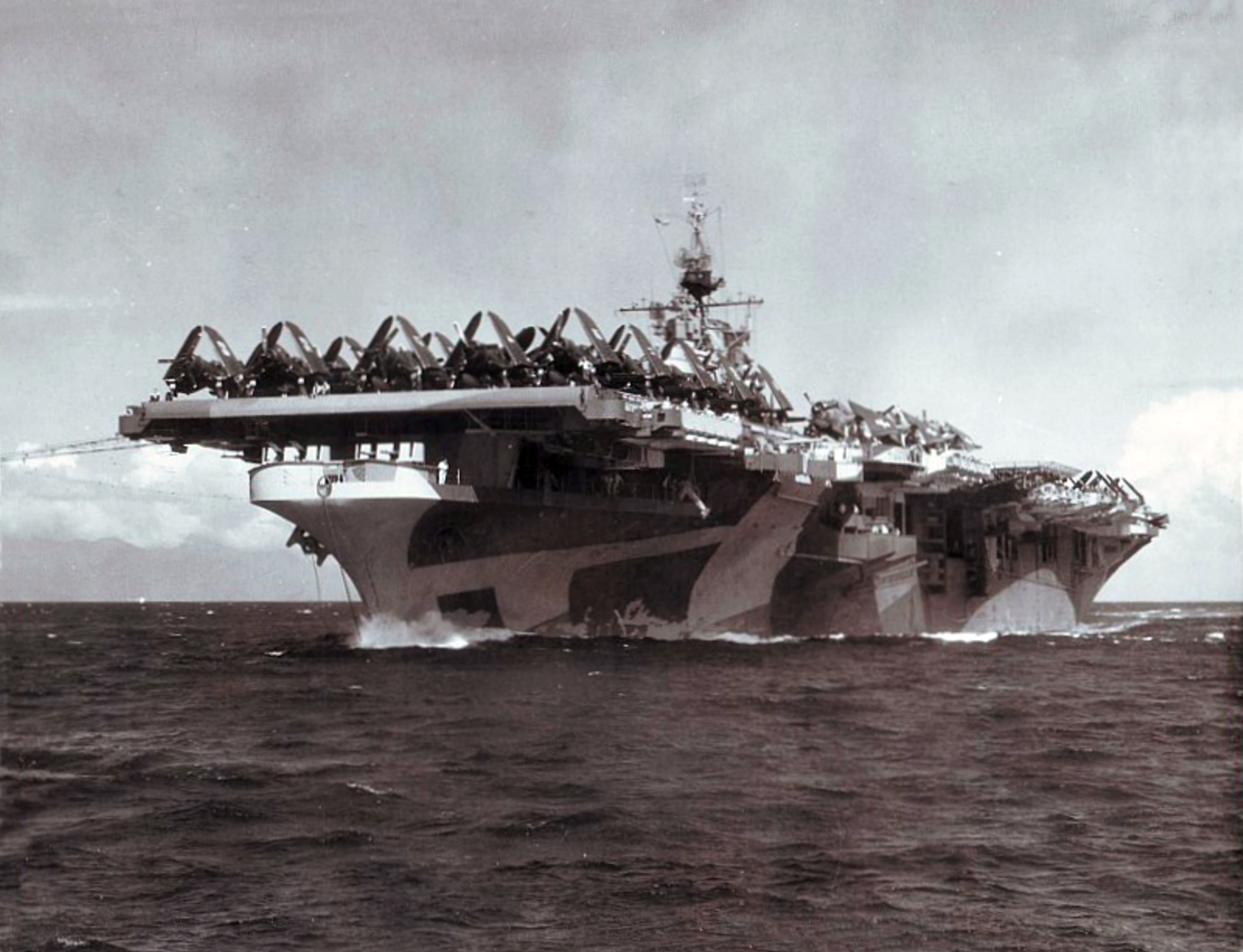
Shangri-La in January 1945

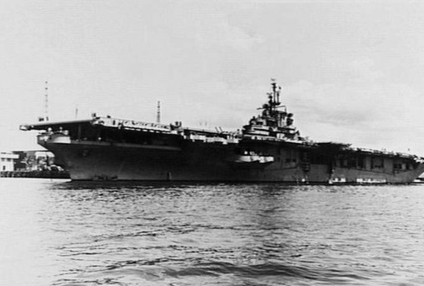
Shangri-La in Sydney, 1947

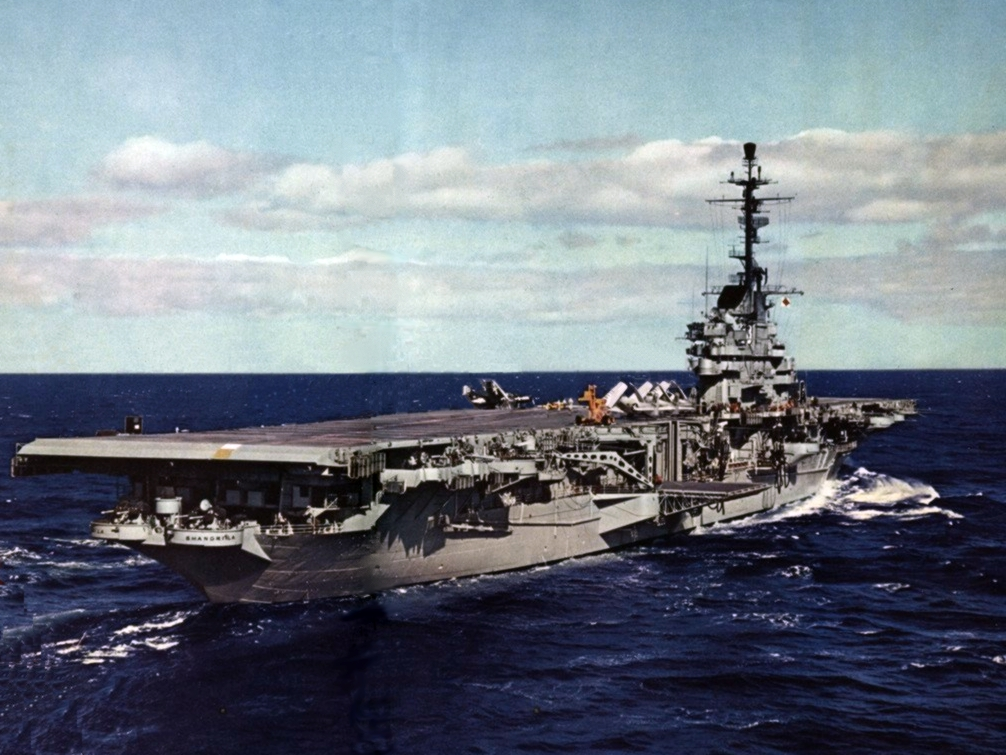
Shangri-La in January 1957

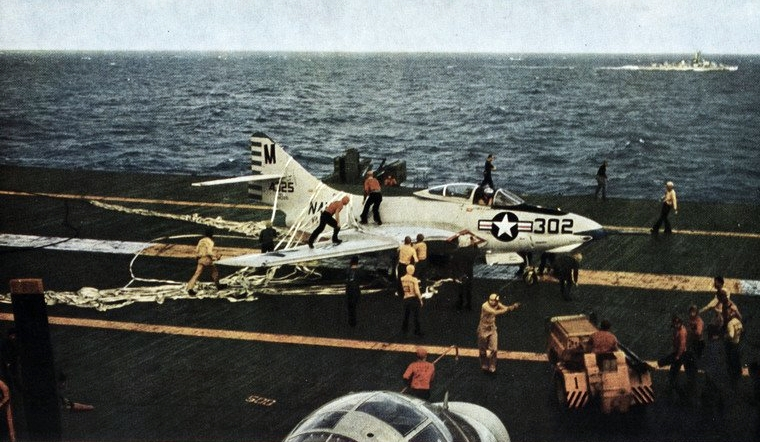
F9F-8 Cougar of VA-63 after barrier landing on Shangri-La in 1957

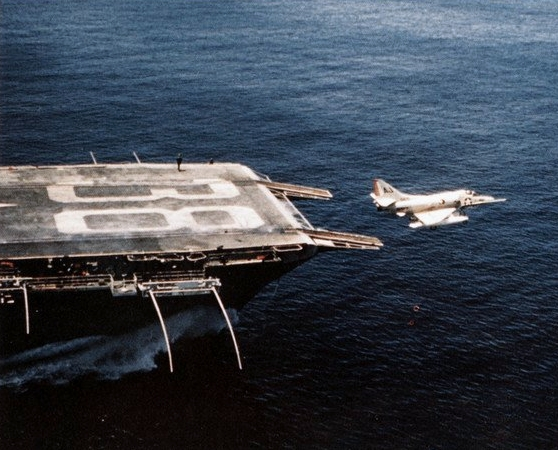
A-4C of VA-12 launching from Shangri-La in 1970

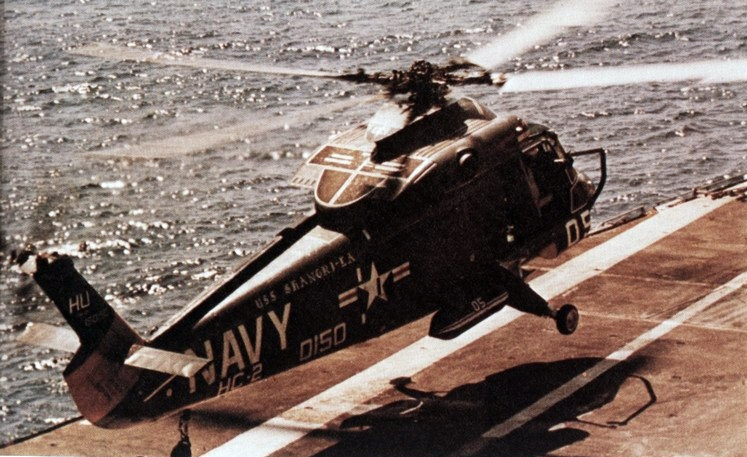
UH-2C of HC-2 on Shangri-La in 1970

== See also ==
- List of aircraft carriers
