= USS Kearsarge (CV-33) =

Essex-class aircraft carrier of the US Navy

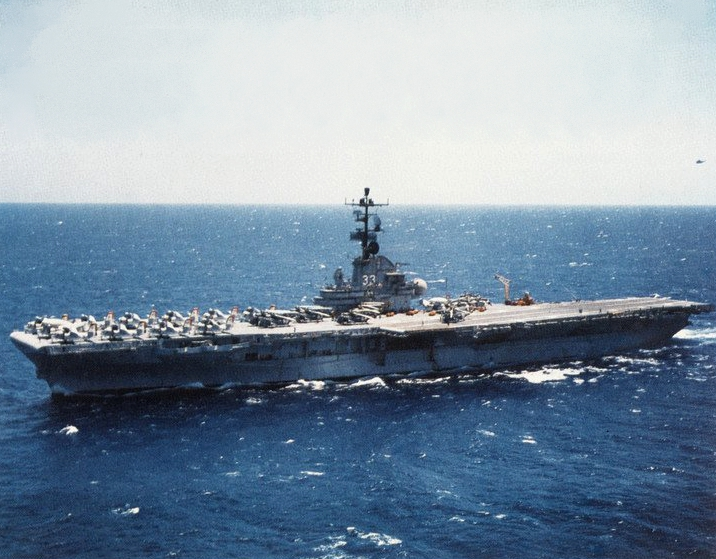
- USS Kearsarge at sea in 1966

History

United States
- Name: Kearsarge
- Namesake: USS Kearsarge (1861)
- Builder: New York Naval Shipyard
- Laid down: 1 March 1944
- Launched: 5 May 1945
- Commissioned: 2 March 1946
- Decommissioned: 16 June 1950
- Recommissioned: 15 February 1952
- Decommissioned: 13 February 1970
- Reclassified: CVA-33, 1 October 1952; CVS-33, 1 October 1958
- Stricken: May 1973
- Fate: Scrapped, February 1974

General characteristics
- Class & type: Essex-class aircraft carrier
- Displacement: 27,100 long tons (27,500 t) standard
- Length: 888 feet (271 m) overall
- Beam: 93 feet (28 m)
- Draft: 28 feet 7 inches (8.71 m)
- Installed power: 8 × boilers; 150,000 shp (110 MW)
- Propulsion: 4 × General Electric geared steam turbines; 4 × shafts
- Speed: 33 knots (61 km/h; 38 mph)
- Complement: 3448 officers and enlisted
- Armament: 12 × 5 inch (127 mm)/38 caliber guns; 32 × Bofors 40 mm guns; 46 × Oerlikon 20 mm cannons
- Armor: Belt: 4 in (102 mm); Hangar deck: 2.5 in (64 mm); Deck: 1.5 in (38 mm); Conning tower: 1.5 inch
- Aircraft carried: 90–100 aircraft

USS Kearsarge (CV/CVA/CVS-33) was one of 24 Essex-class aircraft carriers completed during or shortly after World War II for the United States Navy. The ship was the third US Navy ship to bear the name, and was named for a Civil War-era steam sloop. Kearsarge was commissioned in March 1946. Modernized in the early 1950s as an attack carrier (CVA), she served in the Korean War, for which she earned two battle stars. In the late 1950s she was further modified to become an anti-submarine carrier (CVS). Kearsarge was the recovery ship for the last two crewed Project Mercury space missions in 1962–1963. She completed her career serving in the Vietnam War, earning five battle stars.

She was decommissioned in 1970, and sold for scrap in 1974.

== Construction and commissioning ==
Kearsarge was one of the "long-hull" Essex-class ships. She was laid down on 1 March 1944 at the New York Navy Yard, and was launched on 5 May 1945, sponsored by Mrs. Gwyneth Fitch (née Conger), wife of Admiral Aubrey W. Fitch, Deputy Chief of Naval Operations (Air). Kearsarge commissioned on 2 March 1946, with Captain Francis J. McKenna in command.

The Chief of Naval Operations had ordered three Essex-class carriers on 10 May 1940 in anticipation of Congress passing the Two-Ocean Navy Act, although the ship that later became Hornet originally had the name Kearsarge with the hull number of CV-12. The contract to build her was awarded to Newport News Shipbuilding on 9 September 1940, and her keel was laid down on 3 August 1942. The seventh Hornet (CV-8) was sunk in the Battle of Santa Cruz on 26 October 1942, and the CV-12 hull was renamed Hornet shortly afterwards.

== Service history ==
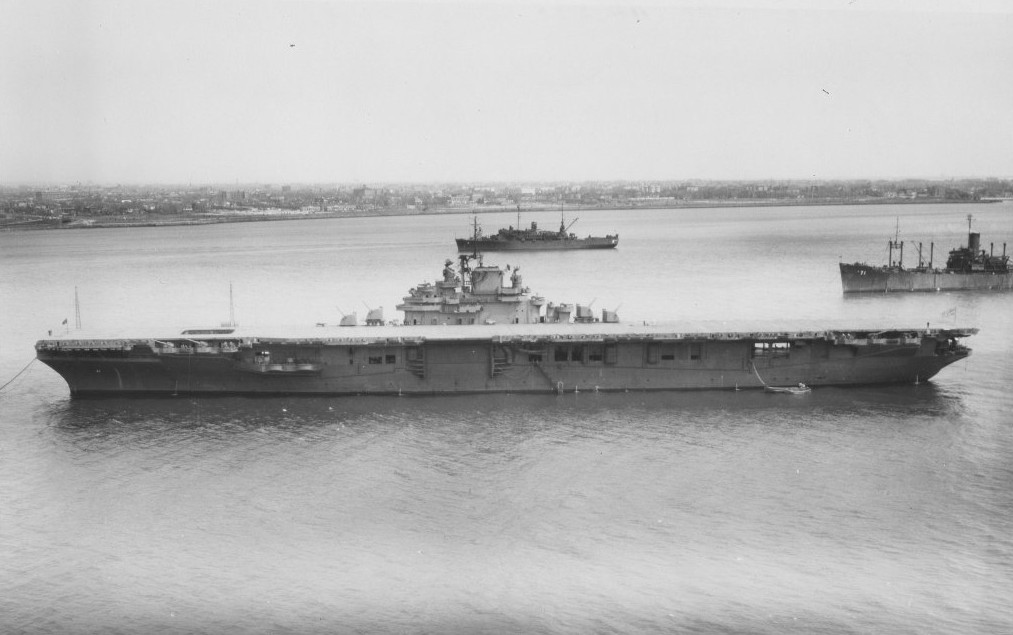
USS Kearsarge on 13 April 1946

Kearsarge arrived at her home port of Norfolk, Virginia, on 21 April 1946, and for the next year engaged in training operations along the East Coast and Caribbean. She cleared Norfolk on 7 June 1947 on a midshipmen training cruise to the United Kingdom.

Upon her return to the United States in August, the carrier engaged in maneuvers for 10 months before departing Hampton Roads on 1 June 1948 for duty with the 6th Fleet. Tragedy marked her steaming. Eighteen Navy personnel and ten Marines were unaccounted for after a 50-foot open launch returning some 90 men to the carrier from liberty swamped in the choppy water of Hampton Roads on 31 May. Sixty-eight were recovered.

During her tour in the Mediterranean, units of the 6th Fleet were placed on alert to insure peace in the Middle East. Kearsarge returned to Quonset Point, Rhode Island, on 2 October, and operated along the Atlantic Coast and the Caribbean until 27 January 1950, when she sailed for the West Coast. The carrier arrived Puget Sound Navy Yard on 23 February, and decommissioned there on 16 June 1950 for the SCB-27A modernization overhaul that would enable her to handle new jet aircraft.

=== Korean War ===
Kearsarge recommissioned on 15 February 1952 with Captain Louis B. French in command. Following shakedown, the carrier cleared San Diego on 11 August for intensive flight training in the Hawaiian Islands. Her readiness complete, she sailed for the Far East to engage in combat missions in the Korean War. Arriving at Yokosuka on 8 September, Kearsarge joined the fast carrier Task Force 77 (TF 77) off the east coast of Korea six days later. For the next five months, the carrier's planes flew nearly 6,000 sorties against Communist forces in North Korea, unleashing considerable damage on enemy positions. She completed her tour in late February 1953, returning to her home port of San Diego on 17 March. While serving in Korea her classification was changed to CVA-33.

After returning to San Diego, Kearsarge was used in the filming of the 1954 movie The Caine Mutiny to depict the abortive visit to Admiral William F. Halsey Jr. aboard his unnamed flagship.

=== Far East ===
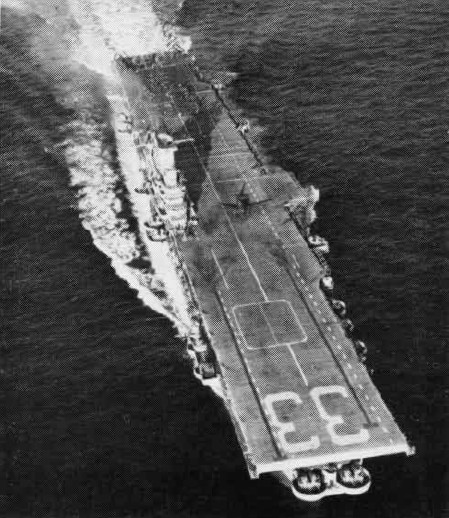
Kearsarge after her SCB-27A modernization in 1953

Kearsarge sailed again for the Far East on 1 July 1953 and operated with the 7th Fleet fast carrier force during the uneasy truce in Korea. The "Mighty Kay" (after three collisions with other ships in a short period of time, including the ocean liner SS Oriana, Kearsarge was also nicknamed by some "Rammin Rankin's Krashbarge" and "The Mighty Kay-RUNCH") also kept watch over the Formosa Straits to prevent the Communists from attacking the Chinese Nationalists on Taiwan. Kearsarge returned to San Diego on 18 January 1954 to resume training operations off California. Clearing San Diego on 7 October, she steamed toward her third deployment to the Far East. While operating with the 7th Fleet, the carrier stood by to assist the Nationalist Chinese in the evacuation of the Tachen Islands. From 6–13 February 1955, Kearsarge supported units of the fleet in the successful evacuation of 18,000 civilians and 20,000 military personnel from the islands. Her cruise ended at San Diego on 12 May and for the next three years operated on the annual deployment schedule to the Far East and training operations off California.

In 1956–57, Kearsarge received the SCB-125 modernization, mainly incorporating a hurricane bow and an angled deck.

During the summer of 1958, Kearsarge was fitted out as a(n) (antisubmarine warfare) support carrier and reclassified CVS-33. Following intensive training in her new role, the carrier sailed on 5 September 1959 for 7th Fleet operations in the Far East. Early in her tour, Japan was hit with a violent typhoon, and Kearsarge played an important role in providing relief to the victims. Her planes landed parties of medical and supply units, while her crew and air group donated clothing and money to the distressed people. After participating in SEATO exercises and 7th Fleet operations, she cleared Yokosuka on 3 March 1960 for her homeward voyage. Three days later in stormy waters 1,200 miles (1,930 kilometers) off Wake Island, four Russians were rescued after drifting 49 days in disabled landing craft. They were flown back to their country after Kearsarge arrived in Alameda, California, on 15 March; and the carrier received thanks from the Soviet Union for this gesture.

A year of training operations preceded her next deployment from San Diego which began on 3 March 1961. The antisubmarine carrier steamed to Southeast Asian waters as the Communists intensified their effort to overthrow the government in Laos. The demonstrations of the 7th Fleet were observed by the enemy and the crisis abated. After six months in the Far East, Kearsarge arrived Puget Sound on 1 November for the second phase of her modernizations.

=== Project Mercury ===
Upon completion of repairs and training, Kearsarge departed Long Beach, California, on 1 August 1962 to station herself in the Western Range as a recovery ship in the Project Mercury orbital space flight of astronaut Walter Schirra after splashdown. On 3 October, after a flawless flight, the carrier played her role in the Space Age by retrieving Schirra and his space capsule, Sigma 7, and returning him to Honolulu for flight back to the mainland.

Kearsarge resumed training exercises, continuing these for six months before arriving Pearl Harbor on 29 April 1963 to once again take part in the space program. The carrier repeated her earlier splashdown recovery by plucking astronaut Gordon Cooper on 16 May 1963 after he orbited the Earth 22 times in his capsule Faith 7.

=== Vietnam ===
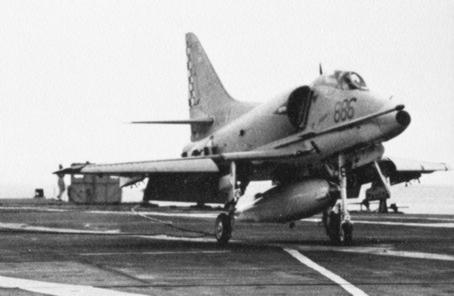
A-4G Skyhawk of the Royal Australian Navy aboard Kearsarge in 1969

She returned the space hero to Pearl Harbor, then departed on 4 June on her eighth cruise to the Far East. Operations with the 7th Fleet included keeping watch on the unsettled problems in Southeast Asia. Kearsarge returned to Long Beach on 3 December for training exercises off California.

On 19 June 1964, the antisubmarine carrier was deployed on her ninth Far Eastern cruise. Arriving Yokosuka on 30 July, Kearsarge was dispatched to the South China Sea, following the Gulf of Tonkin Incident, the North Vietnamese patrol boat attack on U.S. destroyers in the Gulf of Tonkin in early August 1964. While U.S. Navy planes destroyed North Vietnam oil and supply depots, Kearsarge provided antisubmarine protection for the 7th Fleet. Kearsarge returned to Long Beach on 16 December.

After overhaul during the first half of 1965, Kearsarge operated off the West Coast and appeared in a 1965 episode of Bob Hope Presents the Chrysler Theatre entitled "The Admiral," with a number of Douglas A-1 Skyraiders painted in Korean War-period colors on her deck for the production. She departed for the Far East on 9 June 1966. Steaming via Hawaii and Japan, she reached "Yankee Station" on 8 August and operated off Vietnam through 24 October. The next day she headed for the Kuala Lumpur area and anchored in the Strait of Malacca on the 30th. She returned via Subic Bay to "Yankee Station" on 5 November and operated there through the 23rd. The next day, the carrier started home via Hong Kong and Japan, arriving in San Diego on 20 December. She operated on the West Coast until departing San Diego on 18 August and reached Pearl Harbor 10 days later to prepare for future action.

The carrier entering Pearl Harbor towards the end of the film, Tora! Tora! Tora!, representing USS Enterprise CV-6 was in fact Kearsarge, returning to port.

Made redundant by the general fleet drawdown of the late 1960s and early 1970s, Kearsarge was decommissioned on 13 February 1970. Following three years in the Reserve Fleet, she was stricken from the Naval Vessel Register in May 1973 and sold for scrap in February 1974.

== Awards ==

Navy Meritorious Unit Commendation	China Service Medal (extended)	World War II Victory Medal
Navy Occupation Service Medal (with Europe clasp)	National Defense Service Medal (second)	Korean Service Medal (2 battle stars)
Armed Forces Expeditionary Medal (third)	Vietnam Service Medal (5 battle stars)	Republic of Vietnam Gallantry Cross Unit Citation
United Nations Korean Medal	Republic of Vietnam Campaign Medal	Republic of Korea War Service Medal (retroactive)

== Gallery ==
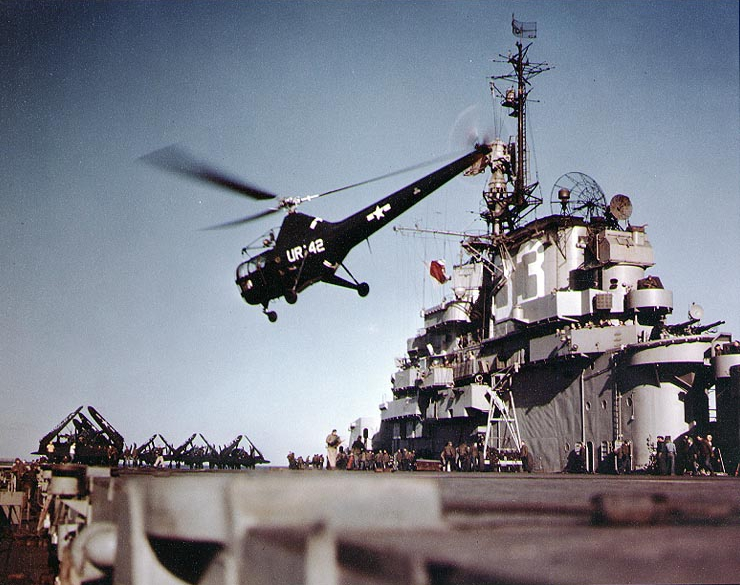
HO3S-1 flying over Kearsarge in 1948

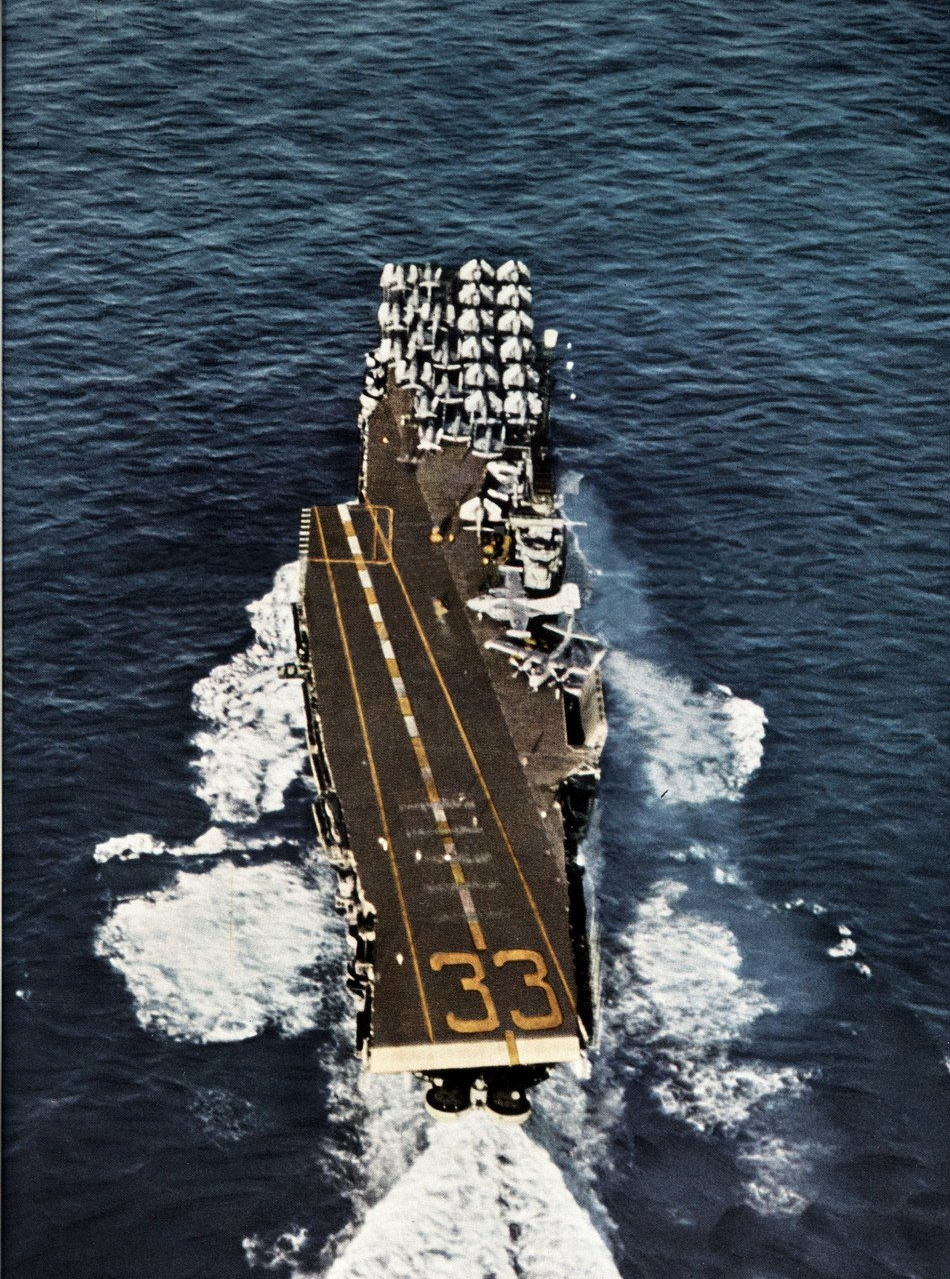
Kearsage in 1957

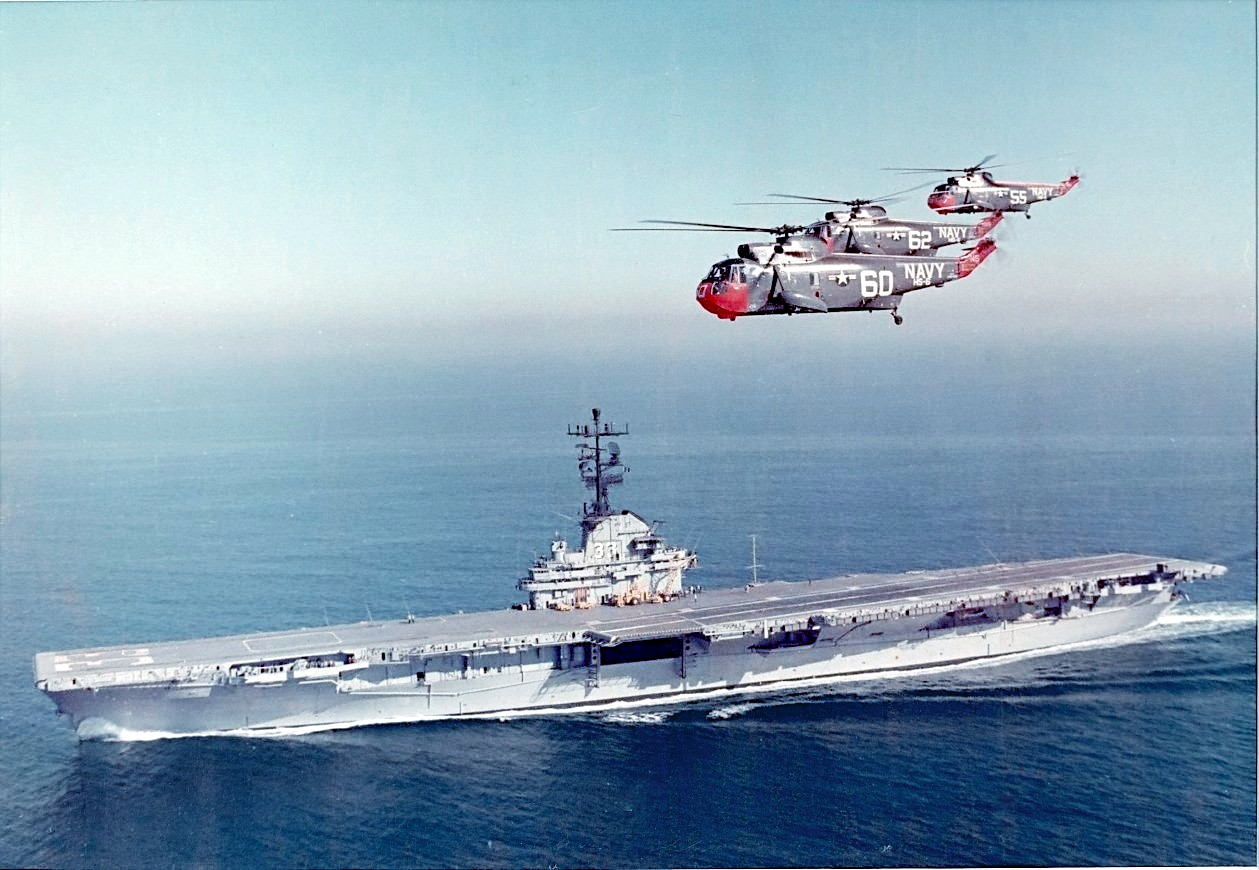
Kearsarge as an anti-submarine carrier with SH-3A Sea Kings in the 1963

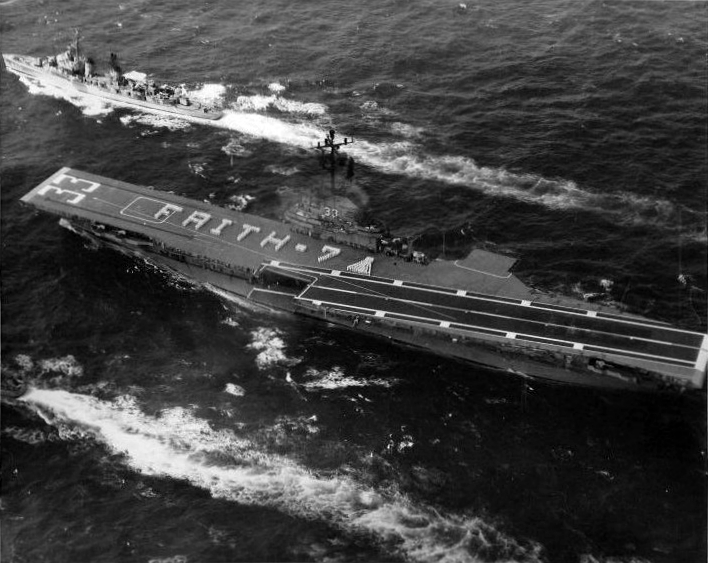
Kearsarge after recovery of Faith 7 on 15 May 1963

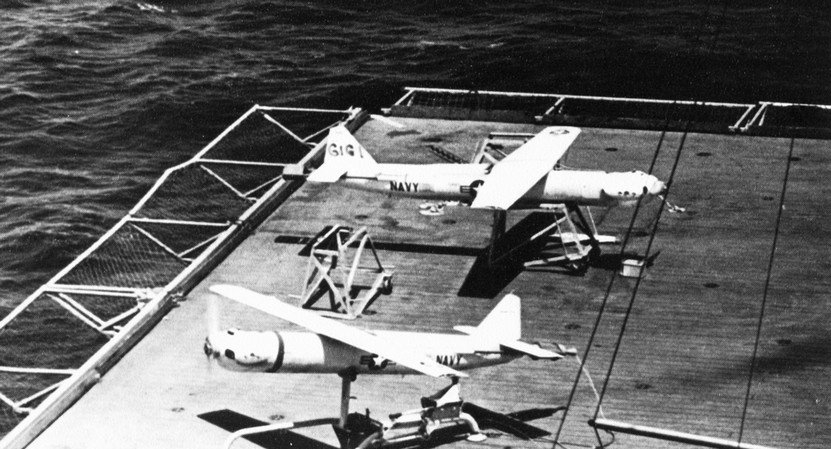
MQM-36 Shelduck drones on Kearsarge in 1966

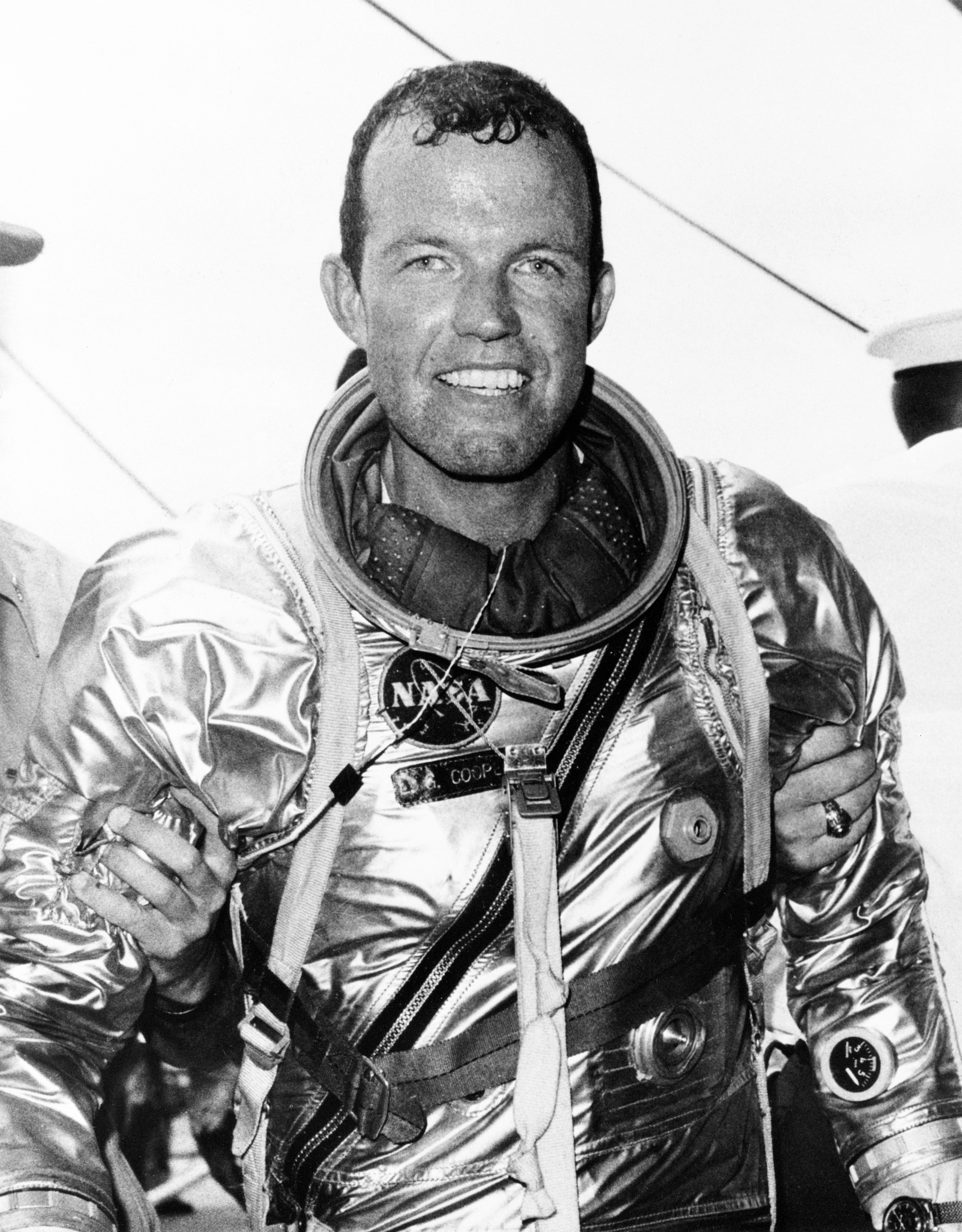
Astronaut L. Gordon Cooper Jr. aboard Kearsarge on 16 May 1963

== See also ==
- List of aircraft carriers
