= CV =

CV may refer to:

- Curriculum vitae, a summary of academic and professional history and achievements

CV, Cv, or cv may also refer to:

== Mathematics, computing, and electronics ==
- CV, Roman numerals representation of 105 (number)
- Coefficient of variation, a measure of dispersion of a probability distribution
- Cross-validation (statistics), a method to separate data in machine learning
- Computer vision, methods of extracting information and meaning from images and video
- .cv, the Internet country code top-level domain (ccTLD) for Cape Verde
- Composite video, an analog video signal format used by older monitors and consumer video equipment
- Capacitance voltage profiling, a technique to characterize semiconductor materials and devices
- CV/Gate, a control voltage and gate solution
- Constant voltage source, electrical description

== Chemistry and fluid dynamics ==
- CV or VC, chemical formula of vanadium carbide
- Cyclic voltammetry, an electrochemical way of measuring
- Calorific value, the amount of heat released during the combustion of a substance
- c_{v}, the specific heat of a material at constant volume
- Control volume, a presumed volume for analysing the thermodynamic state of a system
- C_{v}, the flow coefficient, used to determine the pressure-drop across an element in fluid flow applications

== Biology ==
- Color vision, the ability to perceive differences in light frequency
- Contractile vacuole, an organelle found in some cells
- Coronavirus, a type of virus, notably:
  - Severe acute respiratory syndrome coronavirus 2, the virus causing the 2019–2020 outbreak
  - Coronavirus disease 2019 (COVID-19), the disease caused by the virus
  - COVID-19 pandemic, the ongoing pandemic
- Conduction velocity, the speed at which an electrochemical impulse propagates down a neural pathway
- Cultivated variety or cultivar, once commonly abbreviated cv., now officially deprecated but widely used and recommended

== Transportation ==
- CV (tax horsepower), a French and Italian system of car taxation
- CV, the Hull classification symbol for aircraft carriers in the U.S. Navy
- International CV, a rebadged medium duty Chevrolet Silverado
- Cargolux (IATA designator CV), a Luxembourg cargo airline
- Central Vermont Railway, a railway that operated in the New England states
- Vehicle registration plates of Vatican City

== Places ==
- Cape Verde (ISO 3166 code CV), a country in the Atlantic Ocean, near West Africa
- Cee Vee, Texas, an unincorporated community in the United States
- CV postcode area, postcode area within the United Kingdom
- Vatican City (Latin: Civitas Vaticana)

== Literature and media ==
- CV (novel), a novel by Damon Knight
- Character voice, or CV
- CV Network, a defunct Spanish-language television network in the United States
- Producciones Cinevisión, formerly CV-TV, a Colombian programadora

== Language ==
- Consonant–vowel, an open-syllable pattern in linguistics
- Chuvash language, a Turkic language of Russia (ISO 639-1 code CV)

== Other uses ==
- Cataclysmic variable star, characterized by irregular and large increases in brightness
- Compensating variation, an economic concept of compensation for a price change
- Constant-velocity joint, or CV-joint
- Cross of Valour (disambiguation), various decorations
- Cartellverband der katholischen deutschen Studentenverbindungen, a German umbrella organisation of Catholic student fraternities
- Conversio Virium, a student group at Columbia University
- Christian Voice (UK), a UK advocacy group
- Comando Vermelho, a Brazilian criminal organization
- Comilla Victorians, a Bangladesh Premier League cricket franchise

== See also ==
- C5 (disambiguation), including a list of topics named C.V., etc.
