= Essex-class aircraft carrier =

1940s class of aircraft carrier of the United States Navy

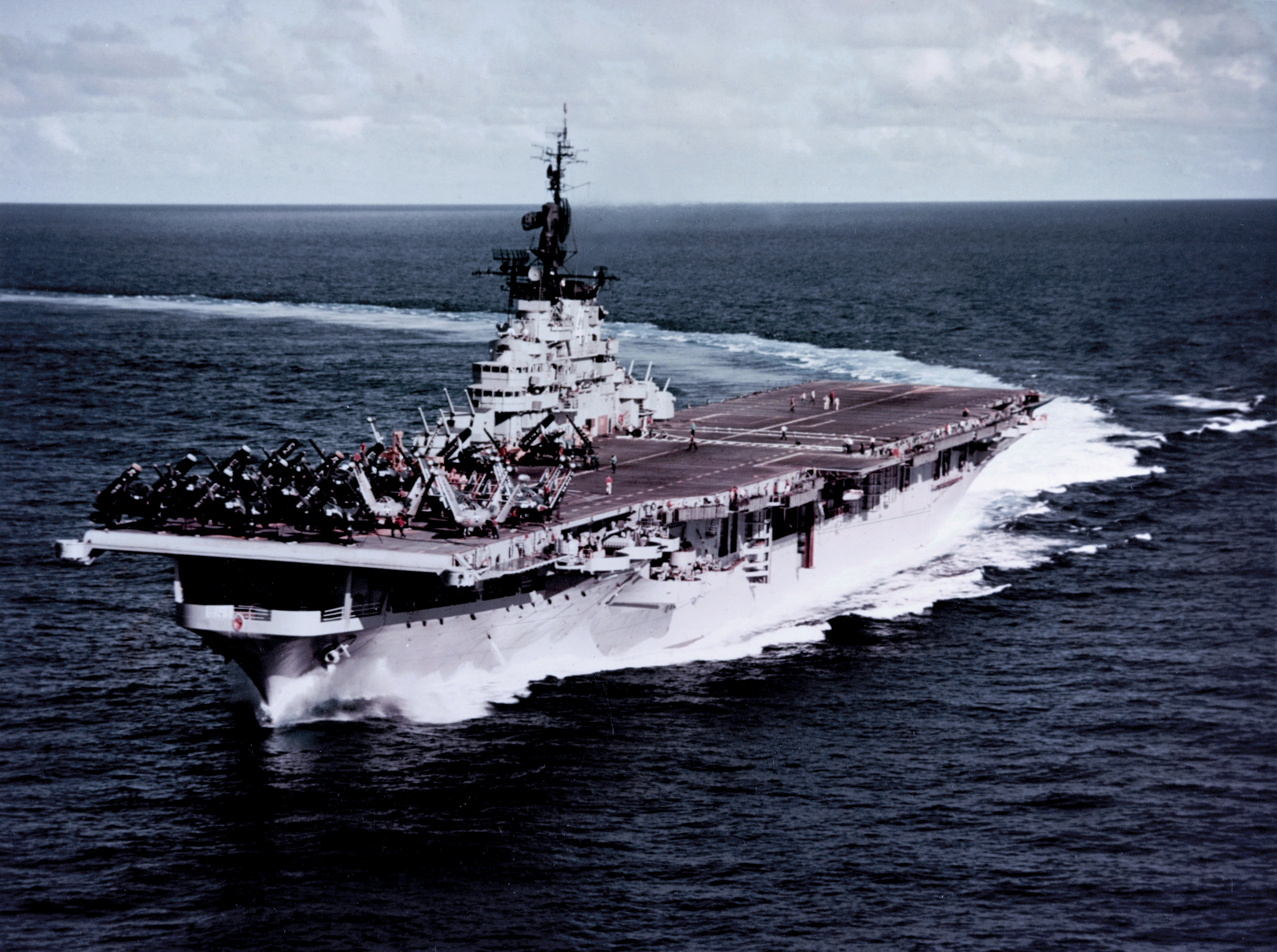
- USS Philippine Sea (CVA-47) underway in 1955

Class overview
- Name: Essex class
- Builders: Newport News Shipbuilding; Fore River Shipyard; Brooklyn Navy Yard; Philadelphia Naval Shipyard; Norfolk Naval Shipyard
- Operators: United States Navy
- Preceded by: Yorktown class; USS Wasp (CV-7)
- Succeeded by: Midway class
- Subclasses: Ticonderoga class
- Cost: US$68–78 million (1942)
- Built: 1941–1950
- In commission: 1942–1991
- Planned: 32
- Completed: 24
- Cancelled: 8
- Retired: 24
- Preserved: 4

General characteristics (all stats as built)
- Type: Aircraft carrier
- Displacement: Standard: 27,066–30,800 long tons (27,500–31,294 t); Full load: 36,380 long tons (36,960 t)
- Length: 872 ft (265.8 m) oa (short-bow units); 888 ft (270.7 m) oa (long-bow units)
- Beam: 93 ft (28.3 m) wl; 147.5 ft (45.0 m) max
- Draft: 27.5 ft (8.4 m)
- Installed power: 8 Babcock & Wilcox boilers; 150,000 shp (110,000 kW)
- Propulsion: Westinghouse geared turbines; 4 × screw propellers
- Speed: 33 knots (38 mph; 61 km/h)
- Range: 20,000 nmi (37,000 km) at 15 kn (28 km/h)
- Complement: 268 officers, 2,363 enlisted
- Sensors & processing systems: 1 × SK air-search radar; 1 × SC air-search radar; 2 × SG surface-search radar; 1 × SM fighter-direction radar (later units); 2 × Mk 4 fire-control radar (earlier units); 2 × Mk 12 fire-control radar (later units); 2 × Mk 22 height-finding radar (later units); 10–17 × Mk 51 AA directors
- Armament: 12 × 5-inch (127 mm) /38 caliber guns; 32 to 72 × 40 mm Bofors guns; 55 to 76 × 20 mm Oerlikon cannon
- Armor: Belt: 2.5–4 in (64–102 mm) on .75 in (19 mm) STS; Decks: 2.5 in (64 mm) STS hangar deck; 1.5 in (38 mm) STS 4th deck
- Aircraft carried: 90–100

The Essex class is a retired class of aircraft carriers of the United States Navy. The 20th century's most numerous class of capital ship, the class consisted of 24 vessels which came in "short-hull" and "long-hull" versions. Thirty-two ships were ordered, but as World War II wound down, six were canceled before they were laid down and another two after construction had begun. Fourteen saw combat during World War II; none were lost to enemy action, although a few sustained crippling damage due to aerial attacks. Essex-class carriers were the backbone of the U.S. Navy from mid-1943 through the Korean War, and, with the three Midway-class carriers added just after the war, continued to be the heart of U.S. naval strength until supercarriers joined the fleet starting in the mid-1950s. Most of the carriers were rebuilt, some more thoroughly than others, with less heavily modified examples serving in anti-submarine roles and more heavily updated ones, able to handle moderate-sized jets, seeing service in the Vietnam War, with Lexington the last to be retired, being decommissioned as a training carrier in 1991. Of the 24 ships in the class, four – Yorktown, Hornet, Lexington, and Intrepid – have been preserved as museum ships.

== Overview ==
Because of the Washington Naval Treaty of 1922 and subsequent treaties limiting the sizes of warships, the designs of the American carriers that preceded the Essex-class had to incorporate many trade-offs that made them less than fully satisfactory ships. However, in 1934 Japan and Italy, two of the five signatories to the Washington and later (1930) London Naval Treaties, who were both beginning to pursue colonial ambitions (in China and East Africa, respectively) announced that they were withdrawing from the treaty system to pursue unfettered development of their navies. The other signatories proceeded to enter into another treaty, the Second London Naval Treaty of 1936, which extended the basic provisions of the earlier treaties for another six years, but included an "escalator clause," which allowed for limits on ship size, numbers, and armament to be set aside should any of the signatories of the earlier treaties begin to build ships in violation of those earlier treaties' limits. The net result of this was that, from 1937 onward, a new set of naval arms races, similar to those of the 1890s–1910s, began.

Following the departure of Italy and Japan from the system, the United States Congress, on 17 May 1938, passed the Naval Expansion Act, which authorized construction of new aircraft carriers displacing, in total, up to 40,000 tons. This permitted the building of a third, minimally modified Yorktown-class carrier, the first Hornet (CV-8), which was ordered in 1939. The portion of the new authorization that remained after Hornet was ordered was not sufficient to allow construction of the desired, significantly larger vessel as a follow-up. However, in the summer of 1940 the global situation took a major turn for the worse for the United States' soon-to-be-ally, Great Britain, with the collapse of France and the entry of Italy into the European war, leaving Britain with one fewer naval power as an ally and one more as an enemy. In the wake of these events, and seeing American entry into the war as ever more imminent, the Roosevelt administration took action, ordering, on 3 July 1940, not just one, but three new carriers, with a total tonnage of nearly 60,000 tons over the limit thus far authorized by Congress. This lack of authorization was corrected a couple of weeks later, on 19 July 1940, with passage of the Two-Ocean Navy Act, under which funding and statutory authorization for these carriers (Essex, CV-9; Bonhomme Richard, CV-10 [later commissioned as the second Yorktown]; and Intrepid, CV-11) and eight additional ones, all to the same basic design, was authorized. Subsequently, in several stages, Congress would appropriate funds for the construction of 21 additional Essex-class carriers; however, a shortage of building slips capable of handling ships of this size meant that delivery of the ships was a drawn-out process, and of the additional 21, only three would be completed in time to see active service in World War II, while nine others were completed during or just after the war, but did not see service. Six ships ordered in 1944 were canceled before construction was begun, while two more were canceled, partially complete, and scrapped. The last ship was left incomplete for several years to allow ideas on how to modify the design so that the Essexes could continue to be useful in the years ahead to mature; this ship, Oriskany, was finally completed in 1950.

Because so many ships were ordered, and no standard naming convention had yet been adopted for aircraft carriers, a variety of names were used for these ships and the Independence-class light carriers; the majority of these were the names of battles or of previous U. S. Navy vessels, but a few, according to some sources, were named after people (mainly founding fathers), and one, Shangri-La, after a fictional place cited, jokingly, by President Roosevelt as the launching point for the Doolittle Raid of April 1942.

== Design ==
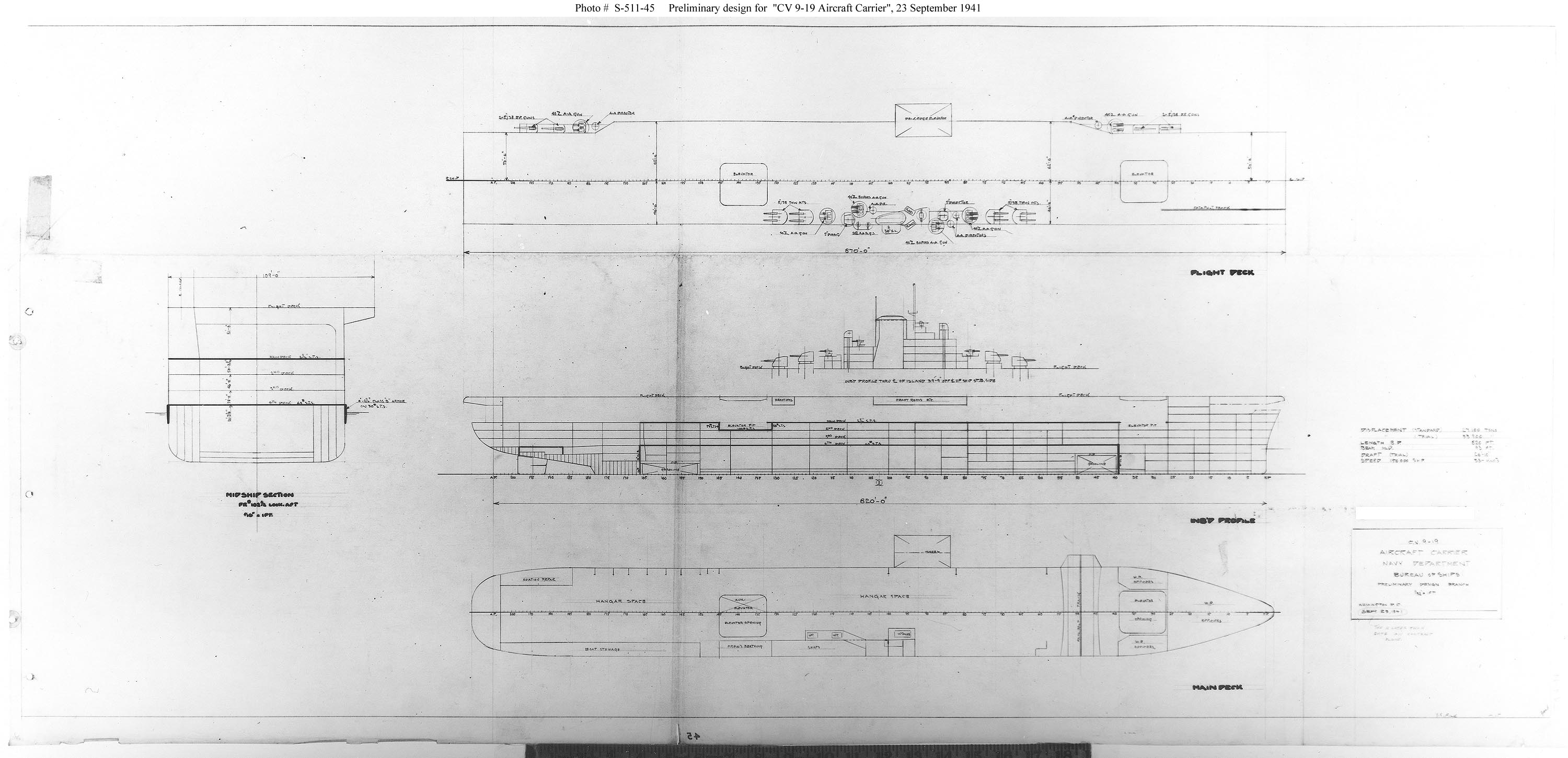
1941 design plans for the Essex class.

The design of the Essex-class carriers was based largely on that of the preceding Yorktown class, modified to address specific points of dissatisfaction. Compared to Yorktown, the size of the vessel was increased, with length between perpendiculars increased from 770 to 820 feet, and beam from 83 to 93 feet. Overall depth of the hull increased by only about 2 feet, but the hull was submerged a foot or so lower in the water than that of Yorktown, leaving the flight deck at the same approximate height above the water. Standard displacement grew from 20,000 to 27,600 tons. The original design for the class called for a complement of 215 officers and 2,171 enlisted men; however, by the end of World War II, most crews were c. 50% larger than that, largely because the addition of vast numbers of guns created a need for greater numbers of ammunition-passers. Avgas capacity was increased from 177,950 gallons (673,714 liters) on the Yorktowns to 231,650 gallons (876,890 liters) on the Essexes.

Engine power was increased from 120,000 to 150,000 horsepower over the Yorktowns through the adoption of new, modern boilers and machinery designed for use in Atlanta-class light cruisers, two sets of which were used in each Essex. The way in which the machinery was arranged differed greatly from the previous class: while the Yorktowns had had all of their boilers grouped into one cluster, ahead of a separate cluster incorporating all of the engines, in the new class boilers and machinery spaces alternated with one another, so that a single torpedo hit that penetrated the defensive system (see below) could not damage all of the boilers or all of the engines at once. Many had wanted to incorporate this modification into the design of the third Yorktown, USS Hornet, but this was not done because rapid completion of that ship was a priority, and redesign would have taken too much time.

The flight deck was significantly larger than those on the Yorktowns, measuring (on early vessels) 862 feet in length and 108 feet in width, compared to 802 and 86 feet on the earlier ships. The deck was supported by a set of deep truss girders, which extended from the underside of the flight deck down approximately 10 feet into the hangar space. Most of these girders were oriented transversely, parallel to each other and spaced 8 to 20 feet apart, and spanned the entire width of the ship, but a single longitudinal girder ran up the centerline of the rear part of the hangar as well. The girders subdivided the uppermost c. one-third of the hangar volume (the portion above the level of the "clear height" cited in reference volumes) into a series of discrete bays, into each of which a spare airplane, with its wings removed, could be "triced up" out of the way until needed.

It was hoped early on that the larger size of the flight deck would allow for a larger number of planes--five squadrons worth (c. 90 aircraft)--to be spotted on deck, in order to deliver, in keeping with long-standing U.S. Navy tactical doctrine, a "deck load strike" of the greatest possible power against an enemy as soon as their location was determined; but even as construction was first getting under way it became clear that, given the increasing size and weight of aircraft (expected to be 50 percent heavier, with significantly larger footprints that would require both greater deck space for parking and longer take-off distances), accommodating so many aircraft on deck would not be feasible. Eventually carriage of four 18-plane squadrons, described as a "logical complement," with provision for operation of a fifth squadron, "with certain handicaps," in an emergency, was set as the goal. A few months later this was amended slightly: the number of aircraft that should regularly be operated would remain four 18-plane squadrons, plus as many additional fighters (probably nine) as could be accommodated, and c. 5 utility planes.

In addition to active aircraft, the carriage of large numbers of spare aircraft (as many as 50 percent above the authorized operating strength) in the hangar below--long called for in ship design specifications and in war planning documents, but generally prohibited under peacetime regulations--was, by 1940, also considered problematical. It was believed that the newer, larger planes, with deeper fuselages, when hung from the hangar ceiling, would project down farther into the hangar space than existing ones, and would likely interfere with maintenance work going on below. The only solution, it appeared, would be to use deeper girders, with their lower edges (defining the hangar's clear height) at the same level as on other ships, and their extra height being accommodated by raising the flight deck by several feet. It was also being proposed that the girders be strengthened to better resist the weight of larger aircraft on the flight deck. The additional weight of girders that were both taller and sturdier would have added significant topweight to the ship's structure, and compromised stability. The raising of the flight deck was therefore not done. The effect of this omission has apparently not been discussed in literature. The ability to carry triced-up planes was further compromised by the addition, at an unknown date (perhaps post-war), of supplementary longitudinal girders under the flight deck, to strengthen it against the weight of still larger planes; the installation of these girders left many of the previously available bays in the overhead too small to accommodate aircraft, even partially dismantled.

The island was reduced in size from those of the Yorktowns, with several facilities (such as an armored conning tower) deleted, and others relegated to a gallery deck, which occupied most of the upper part of the hangar space (above the 17' 6" level) between the forward and midships elevators, and around the sides further aft. The ships were given better facilities for handling ammunition, improved ability to refuel at sea, and more effective damage-control equipment.

Most of the first-line carriers of the pre-war years had originally been equipped with flush deck catapults, but, owing to the speed and size of those ships, and the relatively low take-off speeds required by aircraft of the 1920s and 1930s, very little catapulting was done except for experimental purposes, and catapults were removed from numerous ships prior to the outbreak of war. However, by 1940 airplane weights had begun to go up as airframe strength, the size and weight of engines, and both armor and armament got heavier; because of this the trend toward reducing the number of catapults was necessarily reversed. By the war's end in 1945, catapult launches had become much more common than ever before, with some carrier commanding officers reporting up to 40% of launches by catapult. By the end of the war Intrepid, one of the first of the class to be commissioned, had been refitted with two H-4B flight deck catapults in place of her original single H-4A.

As in the Yorktowns, three elevators were provided, but there was a significant difference: while all three elevators on the earlier class were situated along the centerline of the ship, on the Essex class the middle elevator was replaced with a 60- by 34-foot deck-edge unit, after a more primitive deck-edge design had proven successful on USS Wasp, commissioned in 1940. Centerline elevators generally compromise the strength and protection of a ship's vitals by inserting holes with improvised protection systems into otherwise solid decks, something eliminated by the use of deck-edge elevators. There were two other benefits to these elevators: when the elevator was in the raised position it became possible to park an extra plane or two on its surface, thereby increasing the size of the deck park; and, unexpectedly, the deck-edge unit proved to be more easily maintained than its centerline counterparts. The elevator used on Essex was designed by the Navy's Bureau of Ships, with cooperation from the chief engineer of A.B.C. Elevator Co. The elevator could be folded up by 90 degrees to permit passage through the narrow locks of the Panama Canal.

The ships' protection scheme was very similar to that of the Yorktowns, being built around a protective box in the lower part of the hull amidships. This box was intended to give the core of the vessel resistance to attack with bombs, gunfire, or torpedoes, helping to ensure watertight integrity and protect the ship's engines, boilers, and magazines from battle damage. The fourth deck, defined as the "protective deck," located c. 3 feet (1 m) above the waterline, formed the top of this box; this was made of 1.5-inch-thick (38-mm-thick) STS steel. Lateral protection was very similar to that of the Yorktowns, although more straightforward: whereas the Yorktowns had an armored belt of varying thickness, backed up by varying numbers of torpedo bulkheads along its length, the Essex class had a 10-foot (3-m) deep belt of uniform 4-inch (10-cm) thickness over its uppermost 5 feet (1.5 m), tapering down to 2.5 inches (6.4 cm) over its lower 5 feet, with four continuous longitudinal torpedo bulkheads, made of nickel steel, .75 to 1.5 inches thick, arrayed behind the belt, spaced at intervals of c. 3 to 4 feet inward from each other. The upper edges of the torpedo bulkheads and the belt were all joined to the fourth deck; but while the belt only extended down, along the outside of the ship, for a distance of c. 10 feet (3 m), the torpedo bulkheads extended from the protective deck all the way down to the innermost layer of a triple bottom (the Yorktowns had only a double bottom), which formed the underside element of the box. The ends of the box were formed by two 4-inch-thick transverse bulkheads, made of STS steel and placed 156 and 764 feet (61 and 301 m) aft of the bow; these, like the torpedo bulkheads, extended all the way from the protective deck down to the triple bottom. The steering gear was located in a separate enclosure about 6 feet (1.8 m) high, extending from the waterline downward, with armor 4 inches (10 cm) thick around its perimeter, and 2.5-inch (6.4-cm) armor on top.

The larger dimensions of the vessels, particularly the width (10 feet [3 m] greater, at the waterline, than on the Yorktowns), made it possible to make one major addition to this protection scheme. The additional width made the vessel more resistant to rolling movement, and this improved stability made it feasible to more than double the thickness of the hangar floor, from c. 1.125 inches (2.9 cm) of STS on the Yorktowns to 2.5 inches (6.4 cm) on the Essexes. This thicker deck was strong enough to significantly reduce the possibility of bombs penetrating into the lower decks and damaging the ship's critical systems, or at the very least to initiate detonation of a bomb well above the fourth deck, decreasing the likelihood that the explosion would penetrate that protective deck and damage the ship's vitals. As a side benefit the increased thickness shored up the deck enough that it could better handle he weight of the heavier aircraft that would have to be parked there. British designers tended to disparage the use of hangar deck armor (though not of flight deck armor), but some historians, such as D.K. Brown in Nelson to Vanguard, saw the American arrangement to have been superior. Brown did, however, comment that he believed that the two nations had both made correct choices, given the circumstances under which they anticipated that their carriers would serve. In the late 1930s, locating the strength deck at hangar deck level in the proposed Essex-class ships reduced the weight located high in the ship, resulting in smaller supporting structures and more aircraft capacity for the desired displacement. The Midway class which followed armored both the hangar and flight deck (the latter more heavily).

On the negative side, one innovation found on the initial Essex design was a ventilation system that carried air for the entire ship in and out through a single longitudinal trunk that extended along two-thirds of the vessel's length, at second-deck level. In practice, when damage was sustained these trunks sucked in smoke, noxious gasses, and occasionally flammable vapors and spread them rapidly through large parts of the ship, leading to the fires and explosions that wracked a number of ships, most notably USS Franklin and USS Bunker Hill. The ships were, however, resilient: both Franklin and Bunker Hill survived, and were fully repaired, although neither ever saw action again. The ventilation systems on individual ships were revised over time, and never caused problems again; but the original system unequivocally resulted in more casualties among crews than should have occurred.

Expanded use of flat and straight metal pieces] and of Special Treatment Steel (STS), a nickel-chrome steel alloy suitable for structural use that also provided the same protective qualities as Class B armor plate,] streamlined manufacturing and reduced construction times, with the earliest ships of the class being delivered more than a year earlier than anticipated, a great boon after the loss of most of the navy's fleet carriers during 1942.

== Tactical ramifications of the Essex Class ==
The massive increase in the number of available carriers meant that the tactical organization of U.S. carrier groups changed as the war progressed. In early operations, through 1942, the doctrine was to operate carriers singly or in pairs in task forces, composed typically of the carrier or carriers, four cruisers, and eight destroyers. When two carriers were present, they would cruise in a single formation but separate for operational purposes, on the theory that, in combat, a separation of carriers would make maneuvering to facilitate the launch and recovery of aircraft, and to evade falling bombs, and perhaps also to prevent an enemy from even locating all the carriers that were present, easier. The supposed advantages of having carriers fight it out alone were not borne out in practice, and as new Essex- and Independence-class carriers became available, tactics changed, with groups of 3 to 5 carriers (including at least one CVL) becoming standard. This change coincided with a reorganization of the U.S. Fleet, in March 1943, into several discrete fleets, most notably (for the purposes of this discussion) the 3rd Fleet, in the South Pacific, and the 5th Fleet, in the Central Pacific. Each fleet was now subdivided into task forces by function (i.e., a shore bombardment task force, an amphibious transport task force, a logistical task force, and an escort carrier task force, among others), with each of these being subdivided into multiple task groups, so that subsets of each task force could be used to support operations in multiple places at once. Virtually all of the fleet carriers in the Pacific were initially assigned to a single task force of the 5th Fleet, which started out as TF 50, but eventually became known as Task Force 58. The task groups within TF 58 could operate independently or as a unified task force containing unprecedented numbers of carriers and their air groups. As many as 10 Essexes were active with TF 58 at any given time, with ships being rotated in and out of Task Forces constantly, as ships were recalled for scheduled maintenance or repairs. After July 1944 the ships of the 3rd and 5th Fleets were amalgamated into a single force that took turns under the command of Admirals William Halsey (as the 3rd Fleet) and Raymond Spruance (as the 5th Fleet); under Halsey the Fast Carrier Task Force was known as TF 38, and was generally commanded by Vice Admiral John S. McCain, Sr., while under Spruance it was known as TF 58, and was generally commanded by Vice Admiral Marc Mitscher.

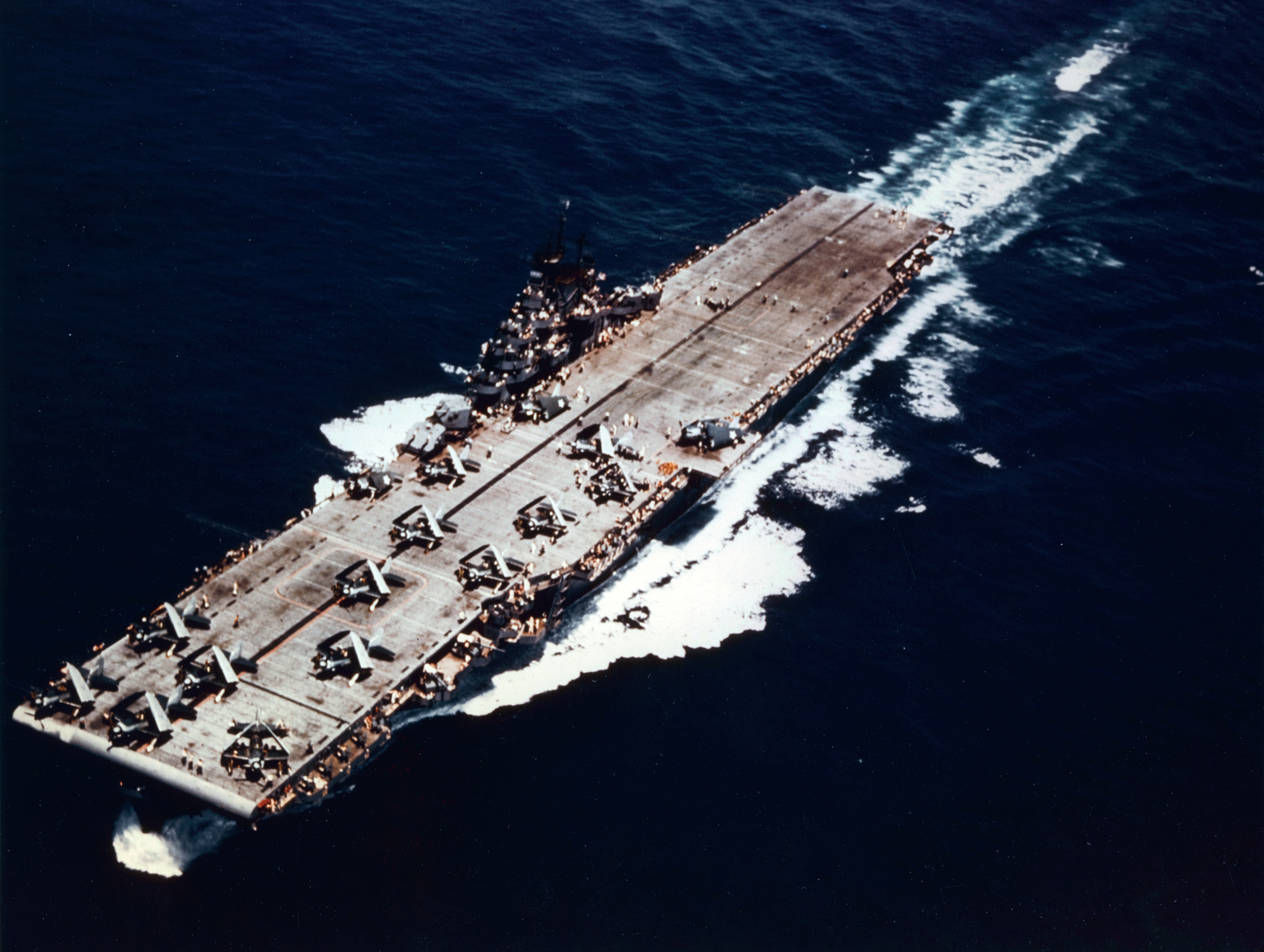
Yorktown at sea in 1943

== Armaments ==
=== Air group ===
The original aircraft complement, nicknamed the "Sunday Punch", consisted of 36 fighters, 36 dive bombers, and 18 torpedo bombers. The Grumman F6F Hellcat (preceded briefly by the Grumman F4F Wildcat) would be the standard fighter, the Douglas SBD Dauntless (later replaced by the Curtiss SB2C Helldiver) the standard scout/dive bomber, and the Grumman TBF Avenger the standard torpedo bomber, which was also often used in other attack roles. The Hellcat and another carrier fighter type, the Vought F4U Corsair, were both capable of carrying substantial bombloads; and as the war progressed, and opposition from Japanese fighters grew, most American carriers began to carry greatly increased numbers of these fighters--generally on the order of 72, plus small night-fighter detachments, in lieu of some of the bomber types--to better protect the fleet, and compensate by assuming ever-increasing responsibility for performing air strikes themselves. In the last year of the Pacific War all carrier-based combat aircraft could carry 5-inch High Velocity Aircraft Rockets (HVARs) in lieu of bombs, allowing them to make stand-off attacks against ground targets and reducing their exposure to anti-aircraft fire.

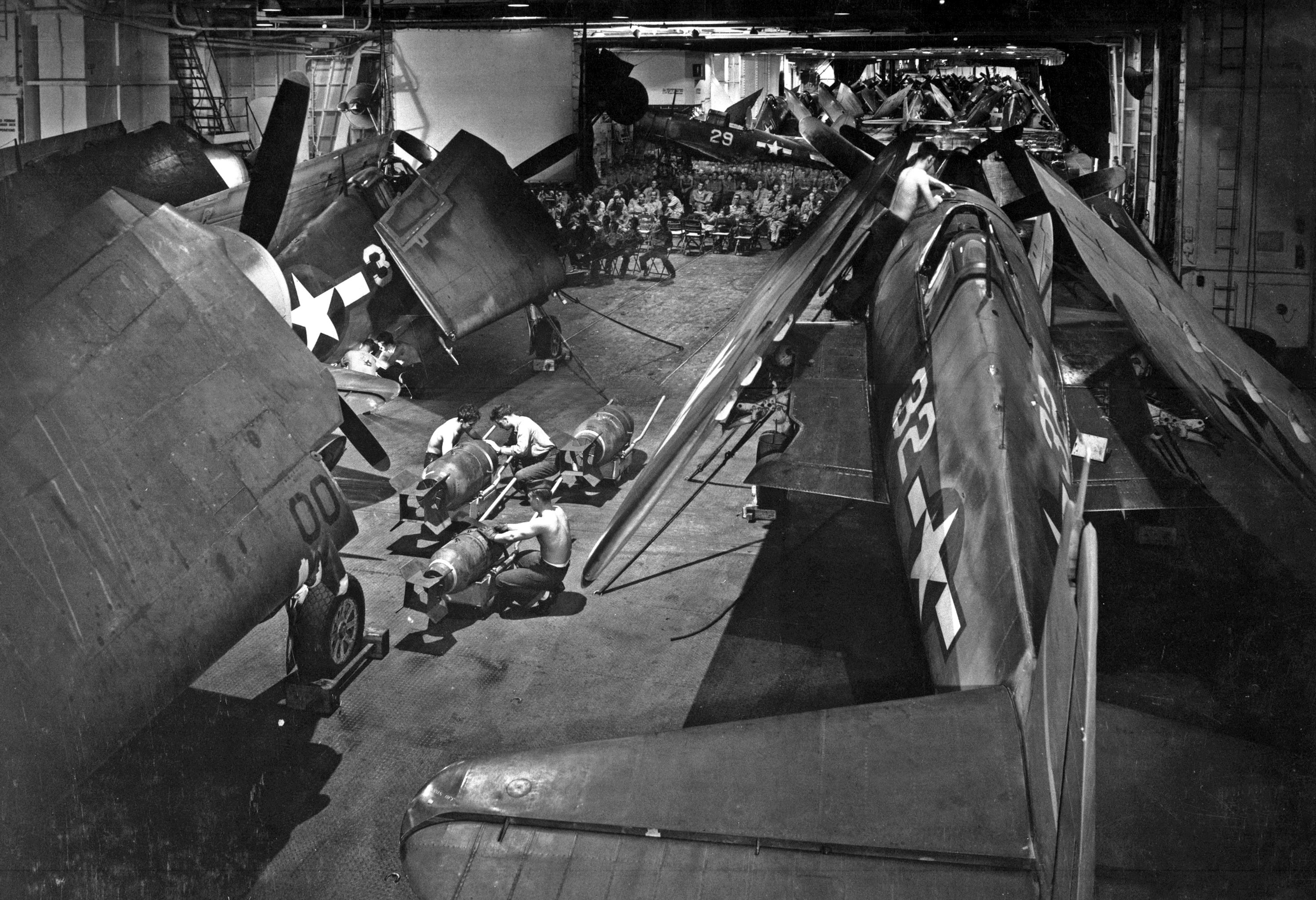
Ordnancemen working on bombs amid F6F-3 Hellcats parked on the carrier's hangar deck, c. October–December 1943. Other crewmen are watching a movie in the background.

=== Guns ===
During the design process debates raged regarding the gun armament for the proposed ships. most notably the arming of the ships, and the armoring of the hangar deck. Proposals to arm carriers with cruiser-caliber (6- or 8-inch/15- or 20-cm) guns had been raised with regard to every American carrier built during the 1930s, as many in the Navy were convinced that carriers would inevitably, at some point, find themselves facing enemy surface forces without any escorts of their own. It was inevitably decided that provision of such weapons on a limited displacement would cause too many compromises on other qualities, but every time opportunities for last-minute revisions arose, the proposals came up again. One proposal that was raised repeatedly involved fitting the ships with 6-inch/47 caliber dual-purpose guns in place of the 5-inch guns of any of several calibers that had been fitted as heavy anti-aircraft guns in all previous carriers, but it was ultimately decided that the capabilities and possible limitations of these new weapons were not yet well enough understood for them to be trusted in such a critical role. The ships were therefore equipped instead with a more conventional carrier armament of twelve 5-inch (127-mm)/38 caliber guns, disposed in four enclosed twin mounts, with two in front of the island and two behind (with each pair superfiring) and 4 single open mounts located on the port side, two forward and two aft. These guns had a maximum range of seven miles and a rate of fire of fifteen rounds per minute. The 5-inch guns could fire shells equipped with proximity (VT) fuzes, which incorporated simple radar which would detonate the shell when it came close to an enemy aircraft. They could also aim into the water, creating waterspouts which could bring down low flying aircraft such as torpedo planes.

As of December 1940 the outfit of smaller guns was to consist of 24 1.1-inch (28 mm) anti-aircraft cannon and eight 50-caliber (12.7-mm) machine guns. However, by the time the first ship was commissioned, just over a year later, both these gun types had been found inadequate, and they had been earmarked for replacement with much more effective types, the Bofors 40 mm anti-aircraft guns and the Oerlikon 20 mm cannon, in vastly increased numbers - initially, 24 Bofors guns in quadruple mounts and 46 Oerlikons in single mounts, with numbers increased repeatedly as the war progressed. The increased number of guns required a massive increase in the number of ammunition passers to keep them firing, contributing heavily to a nearly 50 percent increase in the size of the ships' crews over the course of the war.

=== Radar and radios ===
The Essex class made use of the latest technology and communications equipment. All units were commissioned with SK air-search and SC and SG surface-search radars. Several of the class received SM fighter-direction radar. Two Mark 37 fire control directors fitted with FD Mark 4 tracking radar for the 5"/38 battery were installed; the Mk4 proved inadequate at distinguishing low-level intruders from surface clutter and was quickly replaced with the improved Mark 12/Mark 22 combination. 40mm AA batteries were controlled by Mark 51 optical directors with integrated gyro gun-sight lead-angle calculators. A Plan Position Indicator (PPI) display was used to keep track of ships and enabled a multi-carrier force to maintain a high-speed formation at night or in foul weather. The new navigational tool known as the Dead Reckoning Tracer was also implemented for navigation and tracking of surface ships. Identification Friend or Foe (IFF) was used to identify hostile ships and aircraft, especially at night or in adverse weather. The four-channel Very High Frequency (VHF) radio permitted channel variation in an effort to prevent enemy interception of transmissions. It also allowed for simultaneous radio contact with other ships and planes in the task force.

== "Long-hull" (Ticonderoga subclass) ==
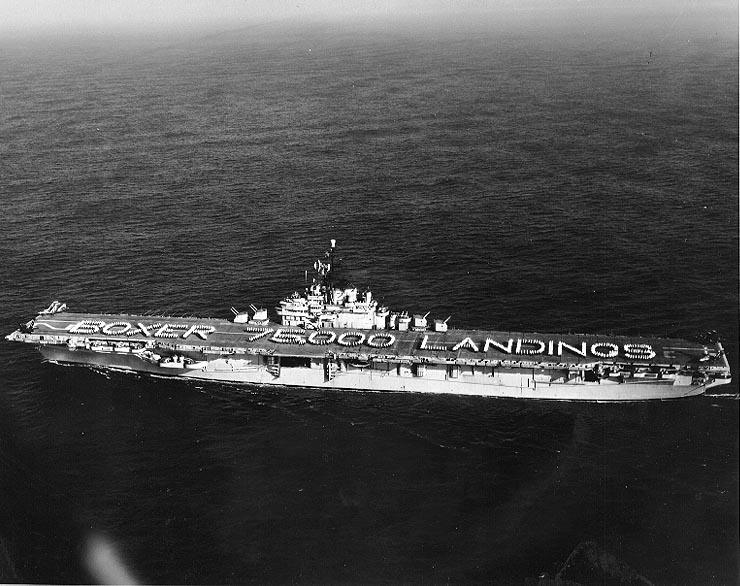
Boxer celebrating 75,000 landings in 1955.

Beginning in March 1943, one very visually significant change was authorized for ships then in the early stages of construction. This involved lengthening the bow above the waterline into a "clipper" form. The increased rake and flare provided deck space for an additional quadruple 40 mm mount; these units also had the flight deck slightly shortened forward to provide better arcs of fire. Of the Essex-class ships laid down after 1942, only Bon Homme Richard followed the original "short bow" design. The later ships have been variously referred to as the "long-bow units", the "long-hull group", or the "Ticonderoga class". However, the U.S. Navy never maintained any institutional distinction between the long-hull and short-hull members of the Essex class, and postwar refits and upgrades were applied to both groups equally. Less immediately visible aspects of the March 1943 design modification included safer ventilation and aviation-fuel systems, moving the combat information center below the armored deck, the addition of a second flight-deck catapult, the elimination of the hangar deck catapult, and a third Mk 37 fire-control director; some of these changes were also made to short-bow ships nearing completion or as they returned to the yards.

== Post-war rebuilds ==
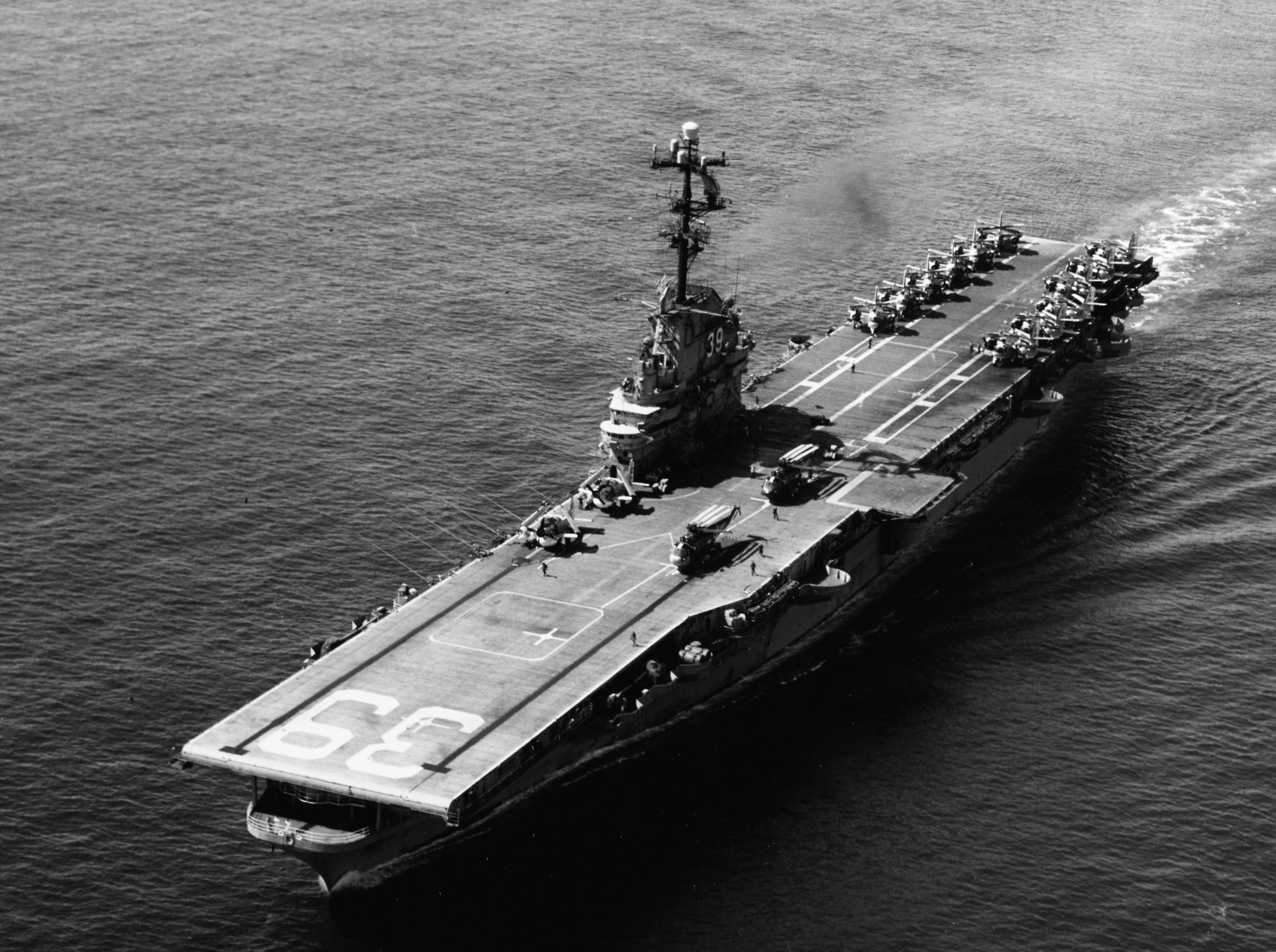
The straight-deck Lake Champlain

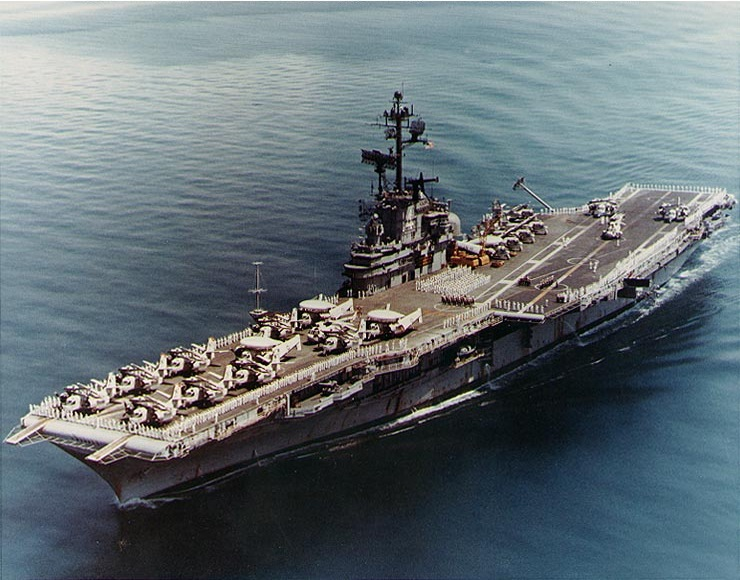
Ticonderoga with angled flight deck.

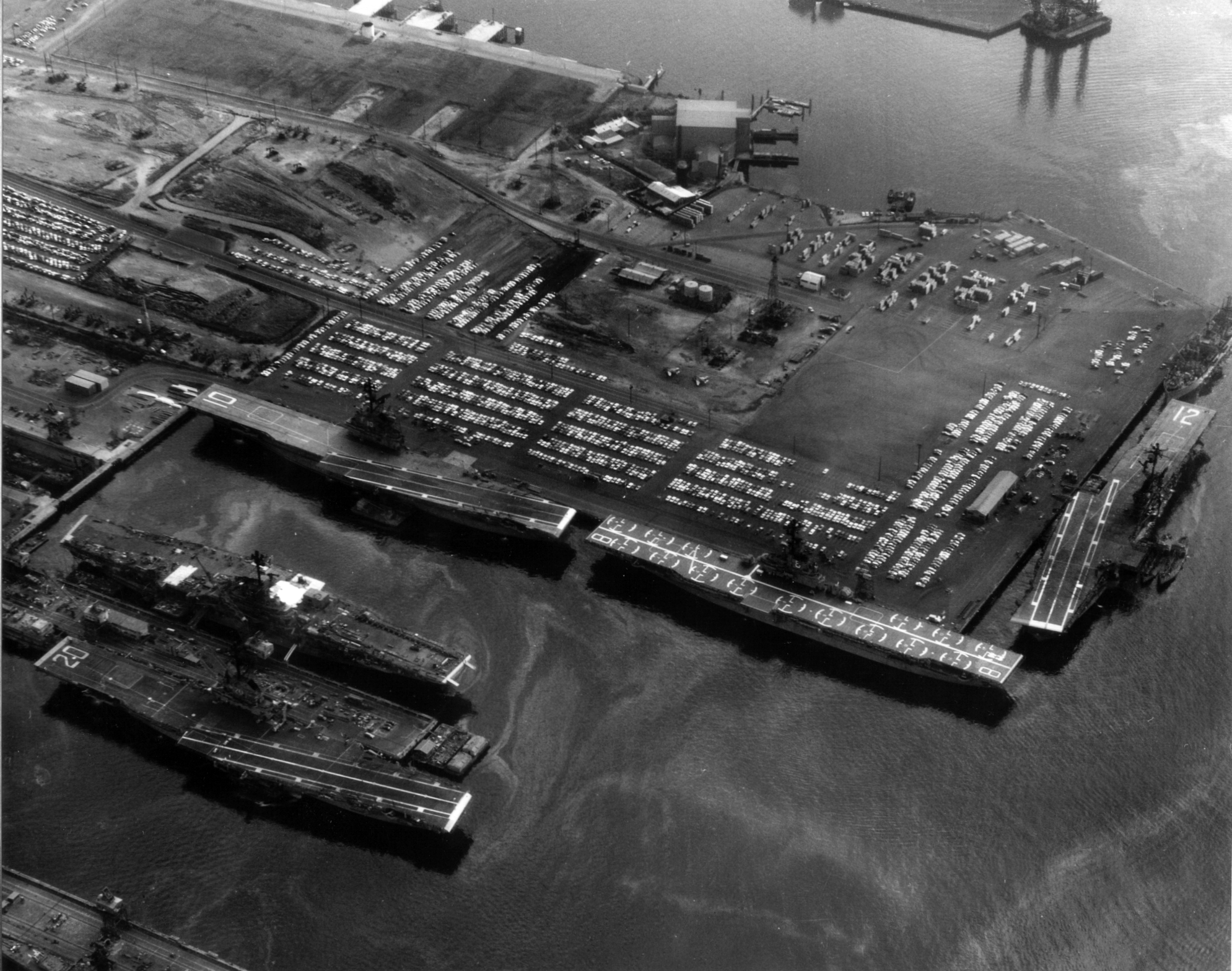
Five Essex-class units at Long Beach Navy Yard in 1966; Bennington (CVS-20), Yorktown (CVS-10) and Hornet (CVS-12) are configured as ASW carriers; Bon Homme Richard (angled deck; with bridle catchers) is an attack carrier (CVA); Valley Forge (axial flight deck) is serving as an LPH; note the helicopter landing circles on her deck.

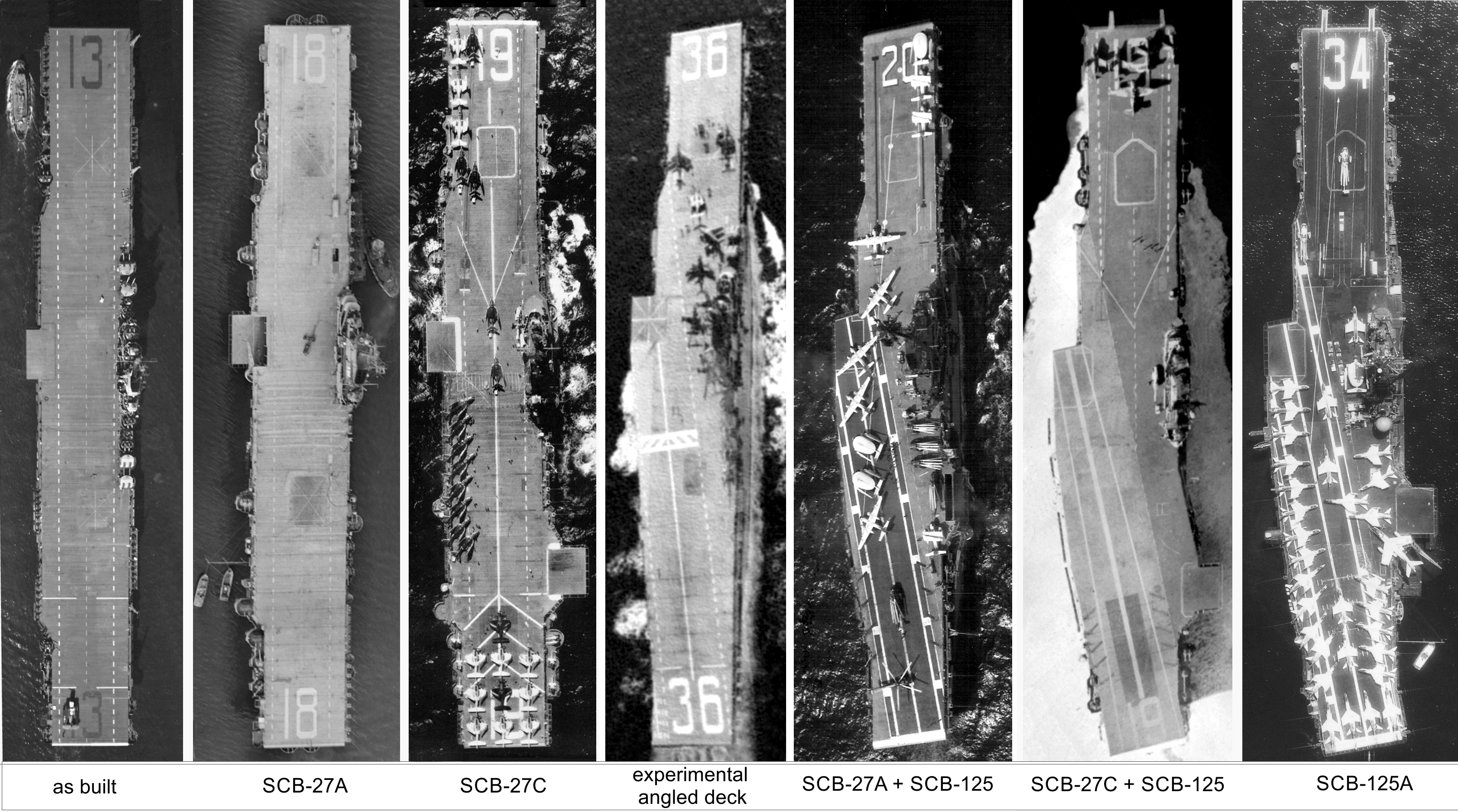
Essex-class modernizations 1944–1960.

The large numbers of new ships, coupled with their larger Midway-class contemporaries, sustained the Navy's air power through the rest of the 1940s, the Korean War era, and beyond. While the spacious hangars accommodated the introduction of jets, various modifications significantly improved the capability of fifteen of the ships to handle the jets' increased weight and speed. Among these modification were jet-blast deflectors (JBDs), greater aviation fuel capacity, stronger decks and elevators. Also included were the British innovations of an optical landing system, steam catapults and, ultimately, an angled flight deck.

All of the short-hulls were laid up in 1946–47 along with five of the long-hulls. Eight of the last nine ships completed stayed on active duty to form the backbone of the post-war Navy's readily deployable combat force (the three larger Midways being reserved for duty as the Navy's nuclear-capable force, deployed to the Mediterranean). Though the Truman administration's defense economies sent three of the active Essexes into "mothballs" in 1949, these soon came back into commission after the Korean War began. Ultimately, all but two short-hulls and all thirteen long-hulls had active Cold War service.

=== Jet aircraft modifications (SCB-27) ===
Oriskany, which had been left unfinished at the end of the war, was completed to an improved design (SCB-27) between August 1948 and September 1950, with a much stronger (straight) flight deck and a reconfigured island to increase flight deck space. Eight earlier ships were thoroughly rebuilt to the Oriskany design under the SCB-27A program in the early 1950s. Six more of the earlier ships were rebuilt to an improved 27C design as the last stage of the SCB-27 program; these ships received steam catapults instead of the less powerful hydraulic units.

=== Angled flight decks (SCB-125) ===
The otherwise unmodified Antietam received an experimental 10.5-degree angled deck in 1952. An angled flight deck and enclosed hurricane bow became the distinctive features of the SCB-125 program, which was undertaken concurrently with the last three 27C conversions and later applied to all 27A and 27C ships except Lake Champlain. Shangri-La became the first operational United States angled deck aircraft carrier in 1955. Oriskany, the first of the modernized ships but the last angled-deck conversion, received a unique SCB-125A refit which upgraded her to 27C standard, and included steam catapults and an aluminum flight deck.

Korean War and subsequent Cold War needs ensured twenty-two of the twenty-four ships had extensive post–World War II service (Bunker Hill and Franklin had suffered heavy damage and were never recommissioned despite being repaired). All initially carried attack air groups; however by 1955 seven unconverted Essexes were operating under the anti-submarine warfare carrier (CVS) designation established in August 1953. The updated units remained active until age and the growing number of supercarriers made them obsolete, from the late 1960s into the middle 1970s.

An unmodernised Essex was offered to the Royal Australian Navy in 1960 as a replacement for HMAS Melbourne but the offer was declined due to the expense of modifications required to make it operationally compatible with the RAN's primarily British-designed fleet. All were scrapped, most in the 1970s.

=== Anti-Submarine Carrier (CVS) ===
As the Forrestal-class "supercarriers" entered the fleet, the eight 27A conversions were designated as ASW carriers (CVS) to replace the original unconverted ships; the latter began to leave active service in the late 1950s. Two 27C conversions were designated CVS in 1962 (although CVS-11 Intrepid would operate as an attack carrier off Vietnam) and two more in 1969.

Tasked and fitted out as ASW carriers, the air wing of an Essex such as Bennington in the 1960s consisted of two squadrons of S2F Trackers and one squadron of SH-34 Seabat ASW helicopters (replaced in 1964 by SH-3A Sea Kings). Airborne early warning was first provided by modified EA-1Es; these were upgraded in 1965 to E-1Bs. A small detachment of A-4Bs or A-4Cs (4 aircraft) were also embarked to provide daylight fighter protection for the ASW aircraft.

The seven angle-deck 27As and one 27C received specialized CVS modifications including bow-mounted SQS-23 sonar under the SCB-144 program in the early 1960s.

=== Landing Platform Helicopter (LPH) ===
Of the unmodernized Essexes, Boxer, Princeton, and Valley Forge were redesignated Landing Platform Helicopter (LPH) amphibious assault ships for the Marine Corps, and remained in commission with their original straight decks until about 1970. They flew helicopters such as the UH-34 Seahorse and CH-46 Sea Knight, serving alongside the purpose-built Iwo Jima-class amphibious assault ships as floating helicopter bases for US Marines. Compared to the Iwo Jimas these ships had accommodation deficiencies (for example, some Marine units could not bunk together, and water evaporation was insufficient to allow all personnel showers within a 24 hour period). The AV-8A Harrier arrived into Marine Corps inventory too late to see regular fixed wing operations return to these ships. It was possible to launch and recover small aircraft like the OV-10 Bronco without need of catapult or arresting wires, but this was very rarely permitted on these straight-deck ships for safety reasons and to avoid interruption of helicopter operations.

== Later applications ==
=== Training carriers (CVT, AVT) ===
Antietam served as a training carrier at Naval Air Station Pensacola from 1957 to 1962. Lexington then served in this role from 1962 until 1991.

=== Aircraft transports (AVT) ===
Five unmodernized Essexes (Franklin, Bunker Hill, Leyte, Philippine Sea and Tarawa) were redesignated as aircraft transports in 1959-1961 but were never used in that role. The LPHs were sometimes also used as aircraft ferries for all branches of the U.S. armed forces.

== Postwar evolution of the Air Group ==
For a typical attack carrier (CVA) configuration in 1956–57 aboard Bennington, the air wing consisted of one squadron each of the following: FJ-3 Furies, F2H Banshees, F9F Cougars, AD-6, AD-5N, and AD-5W Skyraiders, AJ-2 Savages, and F9F-8P photo Cougars.

By the mid-to-late 1960s, the attack air wing had evolved. Oriskany deployed with two squadrons of F-8J Crusaders, three squadrons of A-4E Skyhawks, E-1 Tracers, EKA-3B Skywarriors, and RF-8G photo Crusaders. In 1970, the three A-4 squadrons were replaced by two squadrons of A-7A Corsair IIs. The F-4 Phantom II and A-6 Intruder were considered too heavy to operate in squadron strength from the Essex-class.

== Military contributions ==
One author called the Essex class "the most significant class of warships in American naval history", citing the large number produced and "their role in making the aircraft carrier the backbone of the U.S. Navy."

Essex-class ships played a central role in the Pacific theater of World War II from 1943 through the end of the war, beginning with raids in the central Pacific and the invasion of Tarawa in the Gilbert Islands. The ships successfully performed a number of missions, including air superiority, attacking the Japanese fleet, supporting landings, fleet protection, bombing the Japanese home islands, and transporting aircraft and troops. Along the way, the carriers survived bombs, torpedoes, kamikazes, and typhoons without one ship being sunk.

Eleven of the Essex carriers participated in the Korean War. These ships played a major role throughout the entire war. Missions included attacks on all types of ground targets, air superiority, and antisubmarine patrols.

Thirteen of the twenty-four carriers originally built participated in the Vietnam War, including the prelude and follow-up. However, their inability to support the latest aircraft constrained some of those ships to specialized roles as helicopter carriers or antisubmarine platforms. The ships still performing an attack mission generally carried older aircraft types than the supercarriers. Yet, the Essex class still made significant contributions to all aspects of the U.S. war effort. In one notable event, during the Gulf of Tonkin Incident, aircraft from Ticonderoga fired at North Vietnamese torpedo boats that had attacked a U.S. destroyer.

The carriers also contributed between the wars, projecting U.S. power around the world and performing antisubmarine patrols. When the Cold War heated up, the Essex carriers were often involved, including Quemoy and the Matsu Islands, the Bay of Pigs Invasion, and the Cuban Missile Crisis.

From 1957 through 1991 the Antietam and Lexington were the only providers of vital training for naval carrier pilots.

== Space program ==
Several Essex-class ships played a part in the United States' human spaceflight program, as recovery ships for uncrewed and crewed spaceflights, between 1960 and 1973.

USS Valley Forge was the recovery ship for the uncrewed flight of Mercury-Redstone 1A on 19 December 1960. The first spaceflight by an American was on Mercury-Redstone 3 (Freedom 7), recovered by Lake Champlain on 5 May 1961. Randolph recovered the next flight, Mercury-Redstone 4 (Liberty Bell 7), on 21 July 1961, and she was the primary recovery ship for Mercury-Atlas 6 (Friendship 7), the first orbital flight by an American. The next crewed flight, Mercury-Atlas 7 (Aurora 7), was picked up by Intrepid on 24 May 1962, and Kearsarge recovered the last two Mercury spacecraft, Mercury-Atlas 8 (Sigma 7), on 3 October 1962, and Mercury-Atlas 9 (Faith 7), on 16 May 1963.

When the Mercury program's successor, Project Gemini, got underway, Essexes were again closely involved. Lake Champlain recovered the second uncrewed flight, Gemini 2, on 19 January 1965; and Intrepid recovered the first crewed flight, Gemini 3. Wasp recovered the crew of Gemini IV on 7 June, and on 29 August, Lake Champlain picked up Gemini 5 after eight days in space. In December 1965, Wasp made history by picking up two spacecraft in just over two days: Gemini VI-A on 16 December, and Gemini 7 on 18 December, after their orbital rendezvous test flight. She also recovered Gemini 9A on 6 June 1966 and the final Gemini spaceflight, Gemini 12 on 15 November.

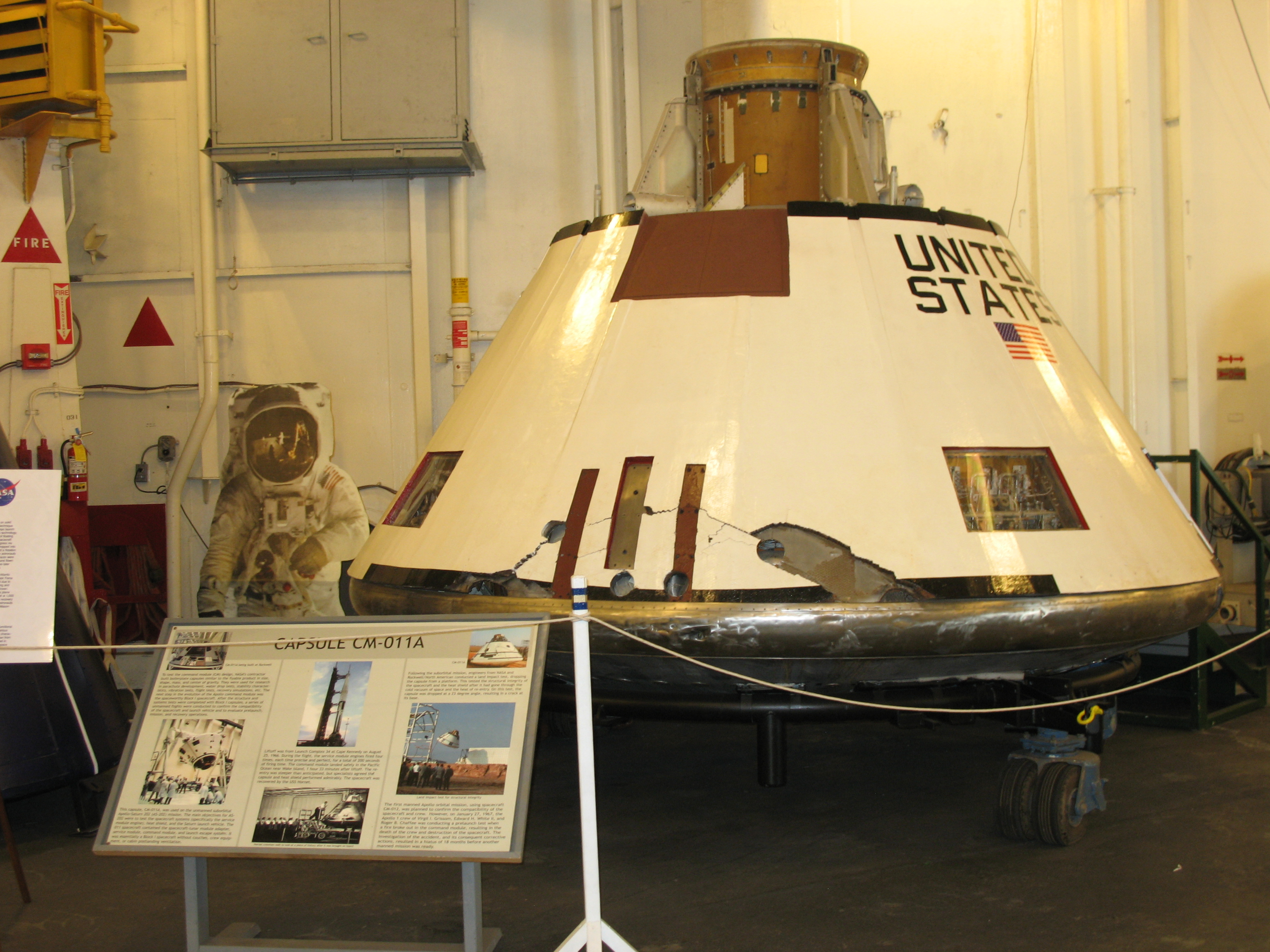
The Apollo program exhibit aboard Hornet.

The successful use of the carriers as recovery ships continued into the Apollo program. On 26 February 1966, Boxer recovered the command module from AS-201, the first uncrewed flight of a production Apollo Command and Service Module. AS-202, another sub-orbital test flight of the command module, was recovered in August by Hornet; the command module from that flight is currently on display aboard Hornet. Bennington recovered the command module of Apollo 4, the first uncrewed flight of the Saturn V launch vehicle, on 9 November 1967.

Eleven months later, Essex recovered the astronauts of Apollo 7, the first crewed mission in the Apollo program, after eleven days in orbit. Yorktown recovered the astronauts of Apollo 8, after their historic flight around the Moon in December 1968; and Princeton recovered the second crew to orbit the Moon, aboard Apollo 10, in May 1969.

Hornet rejoined the program and recovered the astronauts from the first two Moon landing missions, Apollo 11 in July 1969 and Apollo 12 in November. The first steps on Earth of returning astronauts Neil Armstrong, Buzz Aldrin, and Mike Collins, are marked on her hangar deck, as part of her Apollo program exhibit. The three subsequent missions utilized amphibious assault ships as support vessels; however, Ticonderoga recovered the astronauts of the last two moon missions, Apollo 16 and Apollo 17 in April and December 1972.

In the post-Apollo era, Ticonderoga again acted as a recovery ship for the astronauts of Skylab 2, the first crewed mission to Skylab, the first U.S. orbital space station, in June 1973.

== Remaining ships ==
Four Essex-class ships have been preserved, and opened to the public as museums:

- Yorktown, at Patriot's Point, Mount Pleasant, South Carolina
- Intrepid, in New York City
- Hornet, in Alameda, California
- Lexington, at Corpus Christi, Texas.

Until Midway opened at San Diego, every preserved aircraft carrier in the U.S. was an Essex.

Oriskany was scuttled in 2006 to form an artificial reef off the coast of Pensacola, Florida, and can be visited by experienced divers.

== Ships in class ==
List of Essex-class aircraft carriers
Hull no.	Ship	Yard	Ordered	Keel laid	Launched	Commissioned	Rebuild(s)	Redesignations	Decommissioned	Fate
CV-9	Essex	NNSD	Jul 1940	Apr 1941	Jul 1942	Dec 1942; Jan 1951	SCB-27A, 1951; SCB-125, 1956; SCB-144, 1962	CVA-9, 1952; CVS-9, 1960	Jan 1947; Jun 1969	Sold to Defense Reutilization and Marketing Service (DRMS) and scrapped (Jun 1975) in Kearny, New Jersey
CV-10	Yorktown (ex-Bon Homme Richard)	NNSD	Jul 1940	Dec 1941	Jan 1943	Apr 1943; Jan 1953	SCB-27A, 1953; SCB-125, 1955; SCB-144, 1966	CVA-10, 1953; CVS-10, 1957	Jan 1947; Jun 1970	Museum at Charleston, South Carolina (1975)
CV-11	Intrepid	NNSD	Jul 1940	Dec 1941	Apr 1943	Aug 1943; Feb 1952; Oct 1954	SCB-27C, 1954; SCB-125, 1957; SCB-144, 1965	CVA-11, 1952; CVS-11, 1961	Mar 1947; Apr 1952; Mar 1974	Museum at New York City (1982)
CV-12	Hornet (ex-Kearsarge)	NNSD	Sep 1940	Aug 1942	Aug 1943	Nov 1943; Mar 1951; Sep 1953	SCB-27A, 1953; SCB-125, 1956; SCB-144, 1965	CVA-12, 1953; CVS-12,1958	Jan 1947; May 1951; Jun 1970	Museum at Alameda, California (1998)
CV-13	Franklin	NNSD	Sep 1940	Dec 1942	Oct 1943	Jan 1944			Feb 1947	Sold to Portsmouth Salvage Company of Chesapeake, Virginia and scrapped (Aug 1966)
CV-14	Ticonderoga (Note: Long-bow units) (ex-Hancock)	NNSD	Sep 1940	Feb 1943	Feb 1944	May 1944; Oct 1954	SCB-27C, 1954; SCB-125, 1957	CVA-14, 1954; CVS-14, 1969	Jan 1947; Sep 1973	Sold to DRMS and scrapped (Sep 1975)
CV-15	Randolph	NNSD	Sep 1940	May 1943	Jun 1944	Oct 1944; Jul 1953	SCB-27A, 1953; SCB-125, 1956; SCB-144, 1961	CVA-15, 1952; CVS-15, 1959	Feb 1948; Feb 1969	Scrapped (May 1975) in Kearny, New Jersey
CV-16	Lexington (ex-Cabot)	FRSY	Sep 1940	Jul 1941	Sep 1942	Feb 1943; Aug 1955	SCB-27C/125, 1955	CVA-16,1955; CVS-16, 1962; CVT-16, 1969; AVT-16, 1978	Apr 1947; Nov 1991	Museum at Corpus Christi, TX (1992)
CV-17	Bunker Hill	FRSY	Sep 1940	Sep 1941	Dec 1942	May 1943			Jan 1947	Sold to Zidell Explorations, Incorporated of Oregon and scrapped (May 1973)
CV-18	Wasp (ex-Oriskany)	FRSY	Sep 1940	Mar 1942	Aug 1943	Nov 1943; Sep 1951	SCB-27A, 1951; SCB-125, 1955; SCB-144, 1964	CVA-18, 1952; CVS-18, 1956	Feb 1947; Jul 1972	Sold to Union Minerals and Alloys Corporation, of New York City and scrapped (May 1973)
CV-19	Hancock (ex-Ticonderoga)	FRSY	Sep 1940	Jan 1943	Jan 1944	April 1944; Feb 1954; Nov 1956	SCB-27C, 1954; SCB-125, 1956	CVA-19, 1952; CV-19, 1975	May 1947; Apr 1956; Jan 1976	Sold to DRMS and scrapped (Sep 1976) in Los Angeles area
CV-20	Bennington	BNY	Dec 1941	Dec 1942	Feb 1944	Aug 1944; Nov 1952	SCB-27A, 1952; SCB-125, 1955; SCB-144, 1963	CVA-20, 1952; CVS-20, 1959	Nov 1946; Jan 1970	Scrapped (Jan 1994) in India
CV-21	Boxer	NNSD	Dec 1941	Sep 1943	Dec 1944	Apr 1945	Amphib	CVA-21, 1952; CVS-21, 1956; LPH-4, 1959	Dec 1969	Scrapped (Feb 1971)
CV-31	Bon Homme Richard	BNY	Aug 1942	Feb 1943	Apr 1944	Nov 1944; Jan 1951; Sep 1955	SCB-27C/125, 1955	CVA-31, 1952	Jan 1947; May 1953; Jul 1971	Sold to Southwest Marine, San Pedro, California, and scrapped (Mar 1992)
CV-32	Leyte (ex-Crown Point)	NNSD	Aug 1942	Feb 1944	Aug 1945	Apr 1946		CVA-32, 1952; CVS-32, 1953	May 1959	Scrapped (Mar 1970) in Chesapeake, Virginia
CV-33	Kearsarge	BNY	Aug 1942	Mar 1944	May 1945	Mar 1946; Feb 1952	SCB-27A, 1952; SCB-125, 1957; SCB-144, 1962	CVA-33, 1952; CVS-33, 1958	Jun 1950; Feb 1970	Scrapped (Feb 1974)
CV-34	Oriskany (Note: Completed to modified design)	BNY	Aug 1942	May 1944	Oct 1945	Sep 1950; Mar 1959	SCB-27, 1950; SCB-125A, 1959	CVA-34, 1952; CV-34, 1975	Jan 1957; Sep 1976	Order scrapped but no action taken and scuttled as an artificial reef in Gulf of Mexico (May 2006)
CV-35	Reprisal (Note: Never completed)	BNY	Aug 1942	Jul 1944	Dec 1945					Scrapped (Nov 1949) by Boston Metals Co., Baltimore, Maryland
CV-36	Antietam	PNY	Aug 1942	Mar 1943	Aug 1944	Jan 1945; Jan 1951	Experimental angled deck, 1952	CVA-36, 1952; CVS-36, 1953	1949; May 1963	Sold to Union Minerals & Alloys Corp and scrapped (Feb 1974)
CV-37	Princeton (ex-Valley Forge)	PNY	Aug 1942	Sep 1943	Jul 1945	Nov 1945; Aug 1950	Amphib	CVA-37, 1952; CVS-37, 1954; LPH-5, 1959	Jun 1949; Jan 1970	Scrapped (May 1971)
CV-38	Shangri-La	NNY	Aug 1942	Jan 1943	Feb 1944	Sep 1944; May 1951	SCB-27C/125, 1955	CVA-38, 1952; CVS-38, 1969	Nov 1947; Jul 1971	Scrapped (Aug 1988) in Taiwan
CV-39	Lake Champlain	NNY	Aug 1942	Mar 1943	Nov 1944	Jun 1945; Sep 1952	SCB-27A, 1952	CVA-39, 1952; CVS-39, 1957	Feb 1947; May 1966	Scrapped (Apr 1972)
CV-40	Tarawa	NNY	Aug 1942	Mar 1944	May 1945	Dec 1945; Feb 1951		CVA-40, 1952; CVS-40, 1955	Jun 1949; May 1960	Sold to DRMS and scrapped (Oct 1968)
CV-45	Valley Forge	PNY	Jun 1943	Sep 1944	Nov 1945	Nov 1946	Amphib	CVA-45, 1952; CVS-45, 1953; LPH-8, 1961	Jan 1970	Sold to Nicolai Joffre Corporation, Beverly Hills, California, and scrapped (Oct 1971)
CV-46	Iwo Jima	NNSD	Jun 1943	Jan 1945						Canceled while under construction. Scrapped 1946 in slip at Newport News
CV-47	Philippine Sea	FRSY	Jun 1943	Aug 1944	Sep 1945	May 1946		CVA-47, 1952; CVS-47, 1955	Dec 1958	Sold to Zidell Explorations, Incorporated and scrapped (Mar 1971)

Construction notes:

Key of Ship builder abbreviations
NNSD	Newport News Shipbuilding and Drydock, Newport News, Virginia
FRSY	Fore River Shipyard, Quincy, Massachusetts
BNY	New York Navy Yard, Brooklyn, New York
NNY	Norfolk Navy Yard, Portsmouth, Virginia
PNY	Philadelphia Navy Yard, Philadelphia, Pennsylvania

Hull numbers 22–30 in the aircraft carrier sequence were assigned to the Independence-class light carriers (CVL); hull numbers 41–44 were assigned to the large carriers (CVB) of the Midway class.

Reprisal, laid down in July 1944 at the New York Navy Yard and launched in 1945, had her construction cancelled on 12 August 1945 due to the cessation of hostilities when the ship was about half complete. She was scrapped incomplete after tests. Iwo Jima (CV-46) was laid down at Newport News Shipbuilding yards in January 1945, but was cancelled in August 1945 for the same reasons. She was broken up on the slipway.

Six fiscal-year 1945 ships, none of which received names, were provisionally awarded to Fore River (CV-50), Brooklyn Navy Yard (CV-51 and CV-52), Philadelphia Navy Yard (CV-53) and Norfolk Navy Yard (CV-54 and CV-55) in February 1945. Their construction was cancelled in March 1945 when President Roosevelt disapproved the program, before they were formally ordered.

Oriskany (CV-34) was ordered and laid down as an Essex-class vessel, was completed in 1950 to the much modified SCB-27 design, and from commissioning until her reconstruction 1957–59 was listed as the lead ship of the separate Oriskany class.

=== Later class assignments ===
Successive rebuildings and changing roles meant that the original unitary Essex class became divided by the Navy into several classes, which went through many shifts and re-namings. According to the United States Naval Vessel Register the final class assignments were

- CVS-10 Yorktown class (SCB-27A): Essex, Yorktown, Hornet, Randolph, Wasp, Bennington, Kearsarge, Lake Champlain
- CVS-11 Intrepid class (SCB-27C + SCB-144): Intrepid
- CVA-19 Hancock class (SCB-27C): Ticonderoga, Hancock, Bon Homme Richard, Oriskany, Shangri-La
- AVT-8 Franklin class (unreconstructed ships): Franklin, Bunker Hill, Leyte, Antietam, Tarawa, Philippine Sea
- AVT-16 Lexington class (training carrier): Lexington
- LPH-4 Boxer class (helicopter assault conversions): Boxer, Princeton, Valley Forge

== See also ==
- List of ship classes of World War II
