= Armoured flight deck =

Feature of aircraft carriers

An armoured flight deck is an aircraft carrier flight deck that incorporates substantial armour in its design.

Comparison is often made between the carrier designs of the Royal Navy (RN) and the United States Navy (USN). The two navies followed differing philosophies in the use of armour on carrier flight decks, starting with the design of the RN's Illustrious class in the late 1930s and ending with the design of the Midway class, when the USN also adopted armoured flight decks. The two classes most easily compared are the RN's Illustrious class and Implacable class and their nearest USN contemporaries, the Yorktown and Essex classes. The Illustrious class followed the Yorktown but preceded the Essex, while the Implacable-class design predated the Essex but these ships were completed after the lead ships of the Essex class. The development of armoured flight deck carriers proceeded during World War II, and before the end of World War II both the USN, with USS Midway, and the Imperial Japanese Navy (IJN), with Taihō and Shinano would also commission armoured flight deck carriers, while all USN fleet aircraft carriers built since 1945 feature armoured flight decks. The remainder of the IJN carrier force during World War II had unarmoured flight decks just like the Yorktown and Essex classes of the USN.

== Design ==
In choosing the best design for their carriers, the British had to consider the advantages and disadvantages of hangar design. The Illustrious class were also built within the limits of the Second London Naval Treaty constraining them to 23,000 tons displacement. There was a choice between open or closed hangar and the position of the armour. The placing of the strongest deck affected the strength of the hull. The further apart the deck and the keel, the stronger the design. If the flight deck was placed above the main deck then it had to be built to allow for movement with expansion sections. A closed hangar design was the strongest structurally and made for a lighter hull. The RN carried this concept one step further and designed the armoured flight deck to also act as the strength deck without any underlying plating, thus achieving an armoured flight deck on the lowest possible displacement.

The carriers that were built with armoured decks fall into several distinct types – those with armour at the flight deck level protecting the hangar against bombs; those that had armour at the hangar-deck level, to help prevent bombs penetrating into the vitals of the ship against bombs; and those with armour for the lowermost levels of the ship, with the armoured deck only about 3 ft (1 m) above the waterline, intended to protect boilers, machinery, and magazines against both bombs and plunging shells. Frequently these types of decks were used in conjunction with each other; the Illustrious- class vessels had armoured flight and hangar decks (as well as even more heavily armoured sides linking the two to produce a complete armoured box), while the American Essex class had armour at both the hangar (first) deck and fourth deck levels, the latter about 27 ft (8.2 m) below. The different thicknesses of armour, and how they were distributed, are described in the table below.

Armour of some World War II era aircraft carriers
Ship or ship class (standard displacement) (Note: Standard displacement excludes fuel from total weight)	First service entry date	Flight deck	Hangar deck	Protective deck	Side belt
(Japan) Hiryū (17,800 tons)	1939	—N/a		1–2.2 in (25–56 mm)	3.5–5.9 in (89–150 mm)
(United States) Yorktown class (19,875 tons)	1937	—N/a		1.5 in (38 mm)	2.5–4 in (64–102 mm)
(United Kingdom) HMS Ark Royal (22,000 tons)	1938	0.75 in (19 mm)		3.5 in (89 mm)	4.5 in (110 mm)
(United Kingdom) Illustrious class (23,000 tons)	1940	3 in (76 mm)		2 in (51 mm)	4.5 in (114 mm)
(Japan) Shōkaku class (25,600 tons)	1941	—N/a		5.9–8.5 in (150–220 mm)	1.8 in (46 mm)
(United States) Essex class (27,200 tons)	1942	—N/a	2.5 in (64 mm)	1.5 in (38 mm)	4.75 in (121 mm)
(Japan) Taihō (29,770 tons)	1944	3.1 in (79 mm)		1.3 in (33 mm)	2.2 in (56 mm) abreast machinery
(United Kingdom) Implacable class (23,500 tons)	1944	3 in (76 mm)	1.5–2.5 in (38–64 mm)		4.5 in (110 mm)
(Japan) Shinano (64,800 tons) (Note: A converted battleship hull, sunk en route to construction yard for completion)	1944	3.1 in (79 mm)	7.5 in (190 mm)		5 in (130 mm)
(United States) Midway class (45,000 tons)	1945	3.5 in (89 mm)	2 in (51 mm)		7.9 in (200 mm)

== Theory ==
Armour at the flight deck level would protect the hangar deck and the aircraft stored there from most bombs. The armour of the Illustrious class was intended to protect against 1,000 pound bombs. In the Illustrious class, the armoured flight deck extended for about two-thirds of the length of the ship, bounded by the two aircraft lifts (which were outside the armour). The deck was closed by 4.5-inch (114 mm) armoured sides and bulkheads, forming an armoured box. The bulkheads had sliding armoured portals to allow access between the hangar and the aircraft lift. There were 3-inch (76 mm) lateral strakes of main deck armour that extended from the base of the hangar side-wall to the top of the main side belt. The latter protected the machinery, magazines and aircraft fuel and weaponry stores. The RN's closed and armoured hangars were capable of being environmentally sealed for protection against chemical weapon attack. The armoured design meant that it would have to be attacked with armour piercing (AP) bombs, which have much less blast effect than higher-capacity general purpose (GP) bombs carrying about twice the explosive amount. GP bombs also caused severe hull damage if they exploded in the water close to the hull; AP bombs, much less so.

The USN open hangar design allowed large numbers of aircraft to be warmed up while inside, theoretically reducing the time required to range and launch a strike, but storage of fuelled and armed aircraft in an unarmoured hangar was extremely dangerous:

...Captain John S. McCain of the Ranger...actually preferred a relatively small carrier, as long as it could be protected against bombing. Again and again he told the General Board that any U.S. carrier, if her flight and hangar decks were crowded with fuelled and bombed aircraft, was a potential inferno, and that friendly fighters could not guarantee the security of any flight deck...

— Norman Friedman, US Aircraft Carriers,

During the war, the British fitted immersion heaters to the oil tanks of their aircraft so minimal warm-up was required when they reached the flight deck.

American carriers after the Lexington-class (which were converted battlecruiser hulls), and the earlier Japanese carriers, had their armour placed at the hangar deck, essentially treating the hangar spaces and flight deck as superstructure – making these areas very vulnerable to the blast from GP bombs and other explosions, which in turn caused massive casualties in comparison to RN designs. A bomb that struck the flight deck would likely penetrate and explode in the hangar deck, but the armour there could still protect the ship's vitals – including the engine spaces and fuel storage. A modestly armoured flight deck could also possibly initiate detonation of light bombs prematurely, which would reduce the chance of them going through the hangar deck. Such a design allowed for larger, open-sided hangar bays (improving ventilation but making the ship very vulnerable to chemical weapon attack) and the installation of deck-edge elevators. USN carriers with hangar deck armour only usually had wooden decking over thin mild steel flight decks which were easy to repair. The USN moved the structural strength deck to the flight deck, starting with the Forrestal class which had "...an enclosed..." hangar.

Aviation fuel delivery and stowage systems were extremely vulnerable. The Royal Navy stowed aviation fuel in cylindrical tanks, that in turn were surrounded by seawater. RN aviation fuel lines were purged with carbon dioxide when not in use. The USN used a similar system, which was further improved after the two navies began exchanging information in 1940. Pre-war USN and IJN carrier designs used a fuel stowage system which was not as secure as that used by the RN, but allowed for much greater stowage capacity. Several USN and IJN carriers (Note: Lexington, Wasp and Taihō are commonly cited examples.) were lost due to aviation gas fume explosions.

== Doctrine and design ==
The Royal Navy had to be ready to fight a war in the confines of the North Sea and Mediterranean Sea, under the umbrella of land-based enemy air forces. The Royal Navy, with its extensive network of bases and colonies in the Pacific Ocean, had also to be ready to fight in the vast expanses of the Pacific, as did the USN and the IJN, but the USN and IJN did not have to worry about operating in the Mediterranean. The differences in construction were determined by doctrine that was largely driven by the different approaches to the same tactical problem: How to destroy the enemy's aircraft carriers while surviving the inevitable counter strike. Prior to WWII the RN and USN both recognised that the dive bomber could disable the flight decks of enemy aircraft carriers:

...From about 1933 on, the Admiralty showed increasing interest in dive-bombing, as the best means of accurate delivery against small and highly manoeuvrable ships. Dive-bombing was also particularly attractive as a means of neutralizing enemy aircraft carriers, which some in the Fleet Air Arm considered their primary targets. British observers seem to have been impressed by US demonstrations..

— Norman Friedman, British Carrier Aviation',

The RN was thus faced with designing a carrier that would be survivable under the conditions to be expected in the Atlantic, Mediterranean, and Pacific Oceans, and before the development of effective naval radar; these conflicting demands resulted in the development of aircraft carriers whose decks were armoured against 500 lb armour piercing bombs and 1000 lb general-purpose bombs. The RN considered that an unarmoured carrier would be unlikely to be able fly off more than one deck load of strike aircraft prior to being attacked, so the armoured flight deck carriers accepted a reduction in hangar capacity to the equivalent to one deck load of aircraft. USN, IJN, and some RN Fleet carriers such as Ark Royal had sufficient aircraft capacity to allow for two ranges, each equal to a full deck load (Note: To "range" aircraft means to fuel, arm, and arrange the aircraft on the flight deck, for take off. This process could take upwards of an hour, for a full deck load of aircraft.) of strike aircraft. The RN and IJN limited their aircraft carrier's aircraft capacity to the capacity of their hangars and struck down all aircraft between operations. The USN, typically, used a permanent deck park to augment the capacity of their aircraft carrier's hangars. The use of a permanent deck park appeared to give USN carriers a much larger aircraft capacity than contemporary RN armoured flight deck carriers. The flight deck armour also reduced the length of the flight deck, reducing the maximum aircraft capacity of the armoured flight deck carrier, but the largest part of the disparity between RN and USN carriers in aircraft capacity was due to the use of a permanent deck park on USN carriers.

The Royal Navy also had the disadvantage that they entered into World War II with the Royal Navy being pitted against large, land based, air-forces whose aircraft also had superior performance to all existing naval aircraft, while the RAF's increased demand for high performance land based aircraft, after the Fall of France, actually reduced the production and development of Fleet Air Arm aircraft. On the other hand, the RN rapidly introduced new technologies, such as radar, which enhanced the defensive capability of aircraft carriers. The RN thus had to develop new operational doctrines during the war. The USN, in contrast, was able to benefit from technology transfers from the UK and the wartime experiences of the RN, which was freely shared with the USN, prior to its entry into the war, allowing it to anticipate the changes needed to prepare its carriers for the coming conflict with Japan. The USN designed the armoured flight decks of the Midway-class carriers based upon an analysis of the effectiveness of RN armoured flight decks. The IJN also benefited from being able to observe the effectiveness of RN aircraft carriers in action, while both the USN and IJN were able to introduce new aircraft types, prior to their entry into World War II.

== Aircraft restrictions ==
All RN fleet carriers had 16 ft (4.9 m) hangar heights, except the two Implacable-class ships, which had 14 ft (4.3 m) heights, and Indomitable which had a 16 ft (4.9 m) lower hangar and a 14 ft (4.3 m) upper hangar. The Illustrious class had a single 16 ft (4.9 m) clear height hangar and 23 ft (7.0 m) height between the steel beams supporting the armoured flight deck, that was 468 ft (143 m) long. Within the confines of ship design, and the Second London Naval Treaty to which they complied, the Indomitable and Implacable-class carriers had to accept a reduction in hangar heights (to keep the metacentric height within acceptable limits without exceeding the treaty restrictions on overall displacement) and size, and as a result, had some restriction on aircraft types supplied via Lend-Lease. The Indomitable and Implacable-class carriers had a similar steel beam support structure under their armoured flight deck, as in the Illustrious class, and consequently could stow partially disassembled aircraft fuselages and other items, in the hangar overheads, between the steel beams. IJN carriers typically had 16 feet (4.9 m) high hangars, including Taihō and Shinano. The USN Lexington class had 20 ft (6.1 m) hangar heights while the Yorktown, Wasp, Essex, and Midway classes had c. 27 ft (8.23 m) hangar heights--17 ft 6 in (5.33 m) "clear height," to the lowest point on the flight deck support girders, and a further 10 additional feet (2.9 m) above this, among the girders, within which aircraft could be triced up for stowage.

== Defences ==
The British approach of armoured flight decks was meant as an effective form of passive defence from bombs and kamikaze attacks that actually struck their carriers, while the American carriers primarily relied on fighters to prevent the carriers from being hit in the first place. In addition, RN carriers such as Ark Royal or Illustrious had far heavier anti-aircraft (AA) outfits than their USN counterparts, up to the introduction of the USN Essex-class carriers. Ark Royal, in 1940, carried 16 x 4.5-inch guns, 32 x 40mm 2-pounder "pom-pom"s and 32 x 0.5 inch (12.7 mm Vickers machine guns against 8 x 5-inch, 16 x 28 mm and 24 x .5-inch guns for Enterprise, in 1940. "In wartime, however, the US Navy found the armoured carriers fascinating. After having examined HMS Formidable in 1940, the US naval attaché commented that, were he crossing the Pacific, he would prefer her to a Yorktown, the closest US equivalent, on the basis that she might carry fewer aircraft, but she would be much more likely to get there". Late in the war when the USN operated many carriers together and had improved radar, their fighter and AA defence was reasonably effective, yet both conventional and kamikaze attacks were still able to penetrate USN defences. Bunker Hill and Franklin nearly succumbed to them in 1945. The larger air groups (80–110 planes, vs. 52–81 for late war British ships of the Implacable-class) allowed for a more effective combat air patrol (CAP) without reducing strike capability, improving the protection of the whole battle group and lessening the workload of the carrier escorts. Carrier fighters were able to shoot down far more kamikaze aircraft than any amount of deck armour would have protected against showing the value of absolute numbers, but in the early war period IJN aircraft had little difficulty in penetrating USN CAPs; near the end of the war, veteran American fighter pilots in superior Grumman F6F Hellcat and Vought F4U Corsair fighters were able to defeat the young, inexperienced and ill-trained kamikaze pilots with ease and run up huge kill scores but attackers were still able to get through. (In addition to larger aircraft complements, the US Navy had larger fleets and more resources, so they could establish destroyer pickets as part of their "Big blue blanket" defense system, and develop dedicated AAW ships such as the Atlanta-class anti-aircraft cruisers which would have also drawn attention away from the carriers.) On the surface, the record seems balanced.

British naval architect and historian David K. Brown put the practical difference between American and British design philosophies in no uncertain terms: "More fighters would have been better protection than armour," but that British designs were good for the circumstances in which they were meant to be used. Yet, even Ark Royal, Britain's newest carrier prior to World War II, never operated close to her theoretical aircraft capacity. Prior to the development of effective radar and high speed monoplane fighters, a successful fighter defence was extremely unlikely for any navy thus calling into doubt D.K. Brown's conclusions. The benefits of flight deck armour were intended to counter these issues.

Fewer aircraft meant a lower priority to attack than the more heavily armed American carriers and the RN's operational doctrine dictated smaller airgroups, and the armoured hangar carriers had smaller avgas and ammunition supplies to match. However, RN carriers carried far more aircraft later in the war, making use of the deck park when they adopted USN style operational doctrine. The 2nd generation RN armoured carriers, Indomitable and the Implacable class which had an additional half length lower hangar, were considerably less outmatched by their USN counterparts in the numbers of aircraft operated. The RN operating in harsher weather protected their aircraft from the elements and did not use a permanent deck park in the earlier part of the war.

=== Damage analysis ===
US carriers and their fighters shot down more than 1,900 suicide aircraft during Operation Kikusui (the last and largest kamikaze attack in the Okinawa campaign), versus a mere 75 for the British, yet both forces suffered the same number of serious hits (four), on their carriers. However the kamikazes made 173 strikes against other USN targets and the 4 USN carriers suffered a massive death toll, in contrast to the relatively light casualties on the RN carriers.

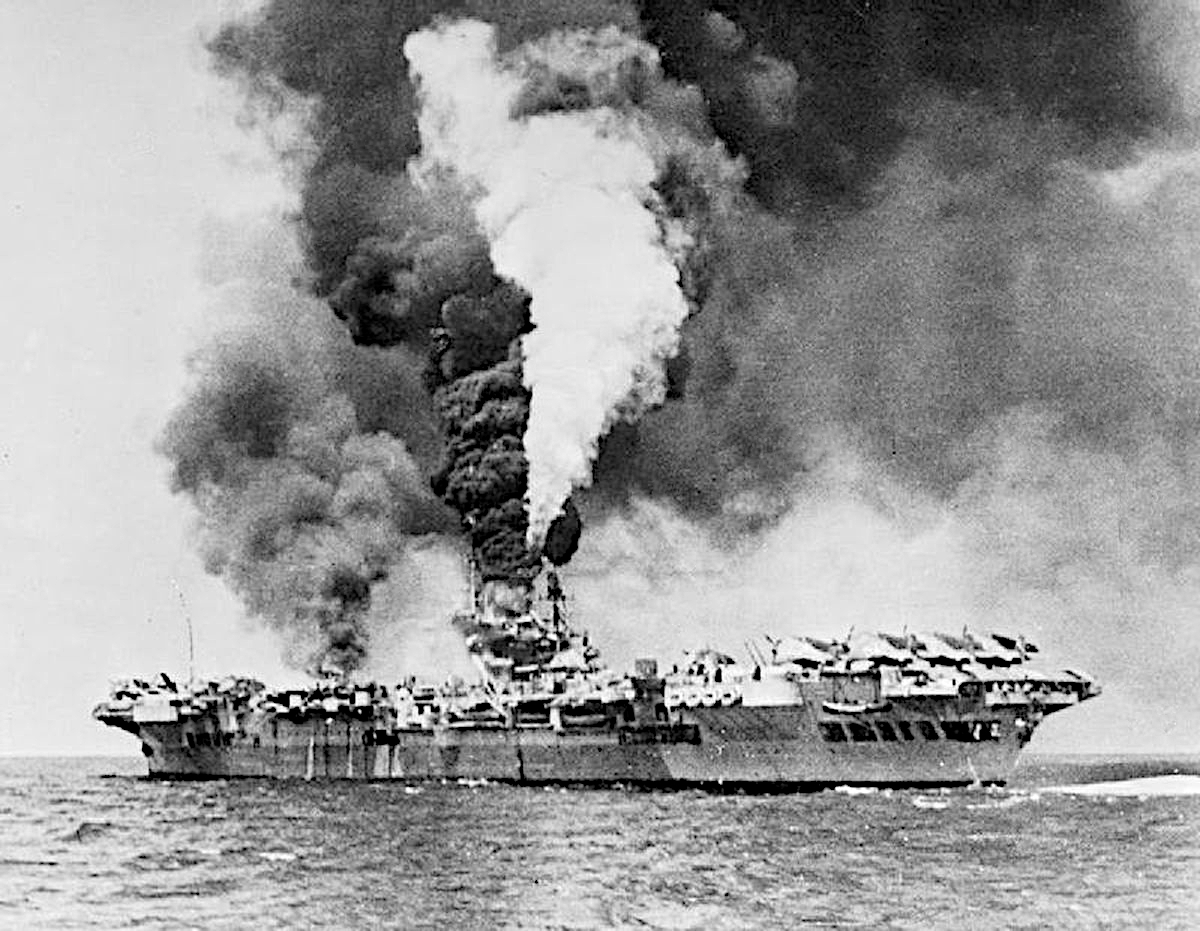
HMS Formidable on fire following a kamikaze strike, Okinawa, 9 May 1945. Total casualties, 3 dead and 19 wounded.

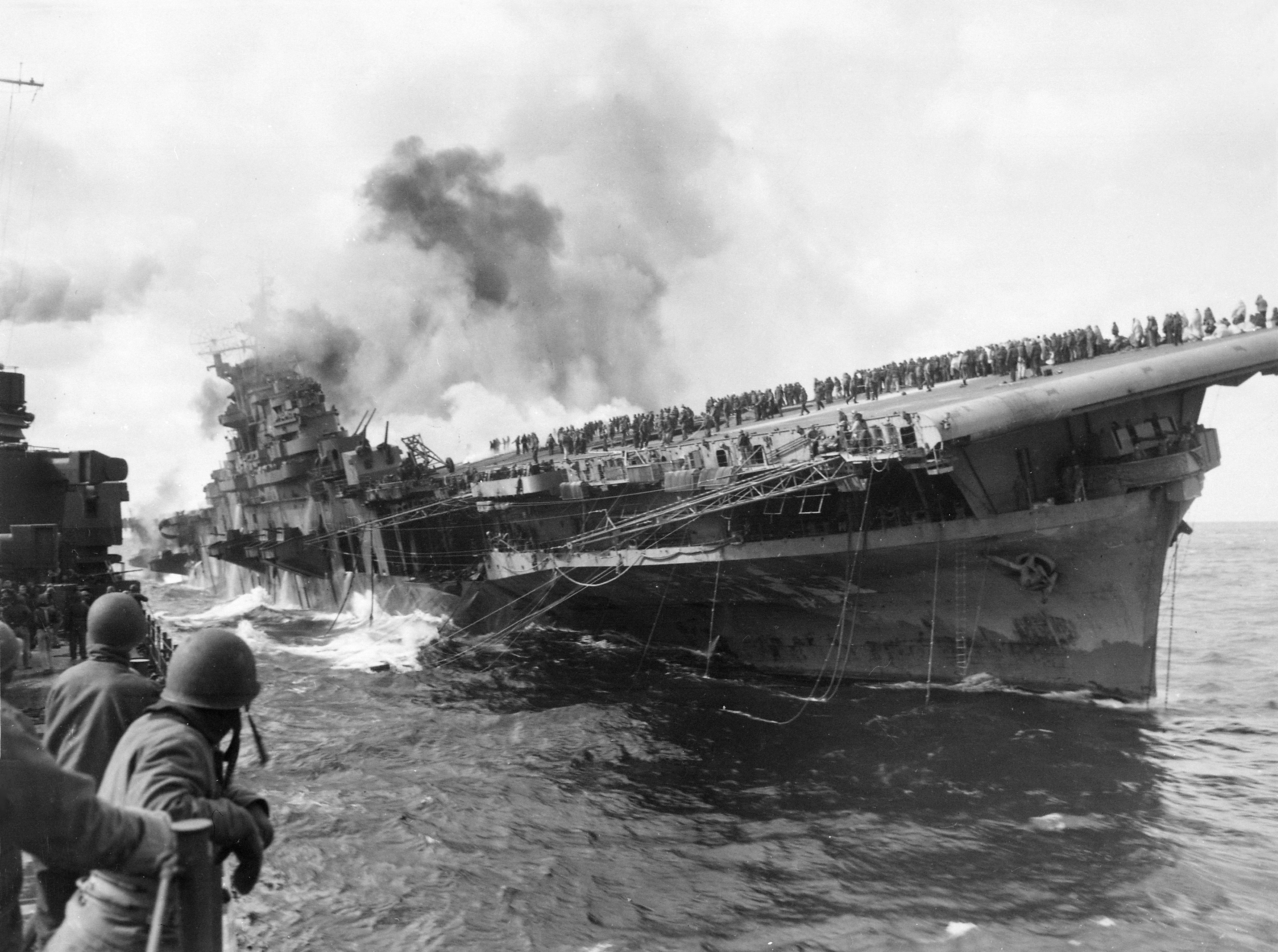
USS Franklin listing, with crew on deck, due to two armor piercing bomb hits penetrating the unarmoured flight deck, 19 March 1945. Total casualties, 807 dead and 487 wounded.

The kamikaze threat overall was serious, but Allied defences neutralised it, and many kamikaze strikes missed the deck armour entirely, or bounced off the decks of both British or American carriers. In some cases, kamikazes either struck glancing blows that did only superficial damage that was fixed within minutes or hours, or missed entirely, due to the poor training and poorer flight experience of their pilots. The majority of kamikazes that did inflict harm caused no more damage than they would have against smaller ships. After a successful kamikaze hit, the British were able to clear the flight deck and resume flight operations in just hours, while their American counterparts often could do the same, but not always; in some cases repairs took a few days or even months. The USN liaison officer on HMS Indefatigable commented: "When a kamikaze hits a U.S. carrier it means 6 months of repair at Pearl [Harbor]. When a kamikaze hits a Limey carrier it’s just a case of "Sweepers, man your brooms."”

American carriers of the Essex class suffered very high casualties from serious kamikaze hits, though all did survive. The ships were most vulnerable during the period just prior to and during the launching of strikes. Early versions of the design also had a unified ventilation system that would transfer smoke and heat from the hangar deck to the lower decks in the event of a fire. While not a kamikaze attack USS Franklin was attacked by a dive bomber and struck by two 250 kg (550 lb) bombs, one semi-armour piercing (SAP) and one general purpose (GP), when she had 47 aircraft preparing for a strike on Honshu. Both bombs penetrated into her hangar and set off ordnance and fuel from ruptured aircraft tanks for a planned ground attack using GP bombs and "Tiny Tim" rockets, killing 724 personnel. USS Bunker Hill was severely damaged by pair of kamikaze hits during preparations for an attack on Okinawa which killed 346 men. Each of these USN carriers suffered more casualties than all the British RN armoured carriers combined, illustrating the life saving features of RN carrier design. Illustrious, which had the highest toll, suffered 126 fatal casualties and 84 wounded when hit by six 1,100 lb bombs on 10 January 1941. The USN studied the superior defensive qualities of Royal Navy armoured carriers and this analysis is partly revealed in the damage report following the attack on Franklin on 13 March 1945:

As a result of study of damage sustained by various British carriers prior to our entry into the war, two important departures from traditional U.S. Navy carrier design were incorporated in the CVB Class, then still under development. HMS ILLUSTRIOUS in an action off Malta on 1 January 1941 was hit by several bombs, three of which detonated in the hangar space. Large fires swept fore and aft among parked planes thereby demonstrating the desirability of attempting to confine the limits of such explosions and fires by structural sectionalization of the hangar space. On the CVB Class the hangar was therefore divided into five compartments separated by 40 and 50-pound STS division bulkheads extending from the hangar deck to the flight deck, each fitted with a large door suitable for handling aircraft. It is hoped that this sectionalization, in conjunction with sprinkler and fog foam systems, will effectively prevent fires from spreading throughout the hangar spaces, as occurred on FRANKLIN on 30 October and 19 March. The damage experiences of several British carriers, which unlike our own were fitted with armoured flight decks, demonstrated the effectiveness of such armour in shielding hangar spaces from GP bombs and vital spaces below the hangar deck from SAP bombs. Accordingly, the CVB Class was designed with an armoured flight deck consisting of 3-1/2-inch STS from frames 46 to 175 with a hangar deck consisting of two courses of 40-pound STS between frames 36 and 192. Although none of the CVB Class carriers were completed in time to take part in war operations, the effectiveness of armoured flight decks against kamikaze attacks was demonstrated by various carriers attached to the British Pacific Fleet. Reference (k) reports two such interesting cases. The VICTORIOUS was struck by three kamikaze aircraft, two of which ricocheted off the armoured flight deck and over the side, causing no important damage. The third carried a bomb which detonated at frame 30 starboard at the butt of the 3-inch flight deck armour with 1-1/2-inch "D" quality (equivalent to HTS) steel. It does not appear that the kamikaze actually struck the ship. The bomb detonation, however, depressed the 3-inch deck slightly but did not tear it open. On the other hand, the 1-1/2-inch "D" quality deck plating was ripped open over a total area of about 25 square feet. Two days were required for temporary repairs, at the conclusion of which the ship was fully operational. HMS FORMIDABLE was hit by two bombs, the first of which struck and detonated on the flight deck 9 feet to port of the center-line at frame 79, directly over a deep bent and at a juncture of three armoured plates. The armoured deck was depressed over an area 24 feet long and 20 feet wide. Maximum depression was 15 inches. Adjacent bents spaced 12 feet forward and aft of the point of impact were slightly depressed. A hole 2 square feet in area was blown in the 3-inch deck. Three fragments penetrated downward through the ship into the center boiler room. The damage in this boiler room, which was not described, temporarily reduced speed to 18 knots. The second bomb struck and detonated on the centreline of the flight deck at frame 94. The 3-inch deck and deep bent directly below the point of impact were depressed about 4-1/2 inches and one rivet was knocked out. However, the ship was fully operational within about 5 hours, including flight operations.

Paul Silverstone in US warships of World War II notes regarding US carriers that, 'vast damage was often caused by suicide planes (Kamikaze) crashing through the wooden flight decks into the hangar below'. Whereas in British carriers 'the steel flight decks showed their worth against kamikaze attacks.'

The only Allied carriers lost to a deck hit were the American Independence-class light carrier, USS Princeton and Casablanca-class escort carrier USS St. Lo (CVE-63). Indeed, many light and escort carriers were unarmoured, with no protection on the hangar or flight deck, and thus they fared poorly against deck hits.

=== Postwar analysis ===
What was not discovered until late in the war was that the kamikaze impacts proved to have a long-term effect on the structural integrity of some British carriers. Their postwar life was shortened, as the RN had a surplus of carriers with many in shipyards being constructed. The USN rebuilt carriers such as Franklin that had been completely gutted and the crew decimated by IJN attacks. HMS Formidable was an excellent example of this; while she weathered a severe kamikaze hit in 1945 which cratered her deck armour, the hit caused severe internal structural damage and permanently warped the hull (damage worsened in a postwar aircraft-handling accident wherein a Vought Corsair rolled off a lift and raked the hangar deck with 20mm cannon fire, causing a severe fire; but plans to rebuild her as per Victorious were abandoned due to budget cuts, not structural damage, and she lingered in reserve until 1956 before being towed off to the breakers. However, no citation is ever given for this accident which appears to be a distorted fabrication of Formidable's 18 May 1945, hangar fire. She carried no air group post war, and never carried the 20 mm Corsair. The Royal Navy planned to rebuild most of the armoured carriers in the early postwar period:

There seems to have been general agreement that the first ship to be modernized should be an Illustrious. Formidable was laid up and required a long refit in any case, so she was provisionally selected for modernization. Illustrious was a deck landing training and trials carrier, and could not be spared, particularly as she was needed to test the new generation of naval aircraft. This left HMS Victorious as the only other candidate. In early 1951 the other two ships of the programme were HMS Implacable, followed by HMS Indefatigable, for modernisation, respectively, 1953–55 (to relieve HMS Eagle so that she could refit in 1956 with steam catapults) and 1954–57. HMS Indomitable was scheduled for a more limited modernisation (1957) as the future deck landing training ship. At this time Eagle was scheduled for completion in August 1951 and Ark Royal in 1954, so that the full programme would provide the Royal Navy with five fleet carriers plus a semi-modernised deck landing training ship.

Illustrious suffered a similar battering, especially off of Malta in 1941 when hit by German dive bombers and late in the war was limited to 22 knots (41 km/h) because her centreline shaft was disabled due to accumulated wartime damage; she spent five years as a training and trials carrier (1948–53) and was disposed of in 1954. Indomitable was completely refit to like-new condition, only to suffer a severe motor spirit explosion on board while refuelling aircraft on the flight deck, which caused "considerable structural and electrical damage to the ship". Indomitable was refitted between 1948 and 1950 and served as flagship of the Home Fleet then served a tour of duty in the Mediterranean, where she was damaged by the petrol explosion. She was partially repaired before proceeding under her own power to Queen Elizabeth II's 1953 Coronation Review, before being placed in reserve in 1954. Indomitable was scrapped in 1956. The explosion which occurred on Indomitable's hangar deck, while severe, would also have caused severe casualties and extensive damage to an Essex-class carrier, several of which returned to service after hangar explosions, primarily due to the USN's considerable financial and material resources. The postwar Royal Navy could only afford to rebuild Victorious and had to abandon plans to rebuild four other armoured carriers due to cost, and to provide crews to man the postwar built carriers, such as the new Ark Royal, due to reductions in manpower.

Another factor is the advantage in resources that the US Navy had over the Royal Navy. The numerous and capacious American yards on the East and West Coasts allowed the US Navy to build and repair carriers at a more leisurely pace while producing ships collectively at a furious rate. The British with their strained facilities were forced to rush repairs (indeed the overloaded British shipyards had forced some vessels to be sent to the US for repairs) and some ships such as Illustrious, were forced into service even though not fully repaired. The RN was in a state of continual contraction after WWII, and simply did not have the resources or inclination to repair ships that it could no longer man.

== Midway and Forrestal classes ==
While flight-deck-level armour was eventually adopted by the Americans for the Midway design, the strength deck remained on the hangar level. Midway had originally been planned to have a very heavy gun armament (8-inch weapons). The removal of these weapons freed up enough tonnage to add 3 inches (76 mm) of armour at the flight deck level. While this made a great deal of sense from an air group perspective, the Midway ships sat very low in the water for carriers (due to their much greater displacement), certainly much lower than the smaller Essex-class carriers, and had a great deal of difficulty operating in heavy seas. Flight deck armoured ships almost universally (except for the Midway class as completed) possessed a hurricane bow, where the bows were sealed up to the flight deck; wartime experience demonstrated that ships with the hurricane bow configuration (also including the American Lexington class) shipped less water than ships with an open bow. Late-life refits to Midway to bulge her hull and improve freeboard instead gave her a dangerously sharp roll, and made flight operations difficult even in moderate seas. This was therefore not repeated on Coral Sea (Franklin D. Roosevelt had been decommissioned years earlier). After the war, most of the Essex-class ships were modified with a hurricane bow and in the case of Oriskany the wooden flight deck surface was replaced with aluminium for improved resistance against the blast of jet engines, making them appear to have armoured flight decks, but in fact their armour remained at hangar level.

The supercarriers of the postwar era, starting with the Forrestal class — nearly 200 feet (61 m) longer and 40 feet (12 m) wider in the beam than their World War II counterparts – would eventually be forced to move the strength deck up to the flight deck level as a result of their great size; a shallow hull of those dimensions became too impractical to continue. The issue of protection had no influence on the change; the Forrestal class had an armoured flight deck of at least 1.5" thickness. Some of the follow-on classes to the Forrestals also had armoured flight decks although deck armour is of little to no use against modern anti-ship missiles, it may help limit the damage from flight deck explosions. The experience of World War II caused the USN to change their design policy in favour of armoured flight decks:

The main armor carried on Enterprise is the heavy armored flight deck. This was to prove a significant factor in the catastrophic fire and explosions that occurred on Enterprise's flight deck in 1969. The US Navy learned its lesson the hard way during World War II when all its carriers had only armored hangar decks. All attack carriers built since the Midway class have had armored flight decks.
