= Midway-class aircraft carrier =

Class of American aircraft carriers

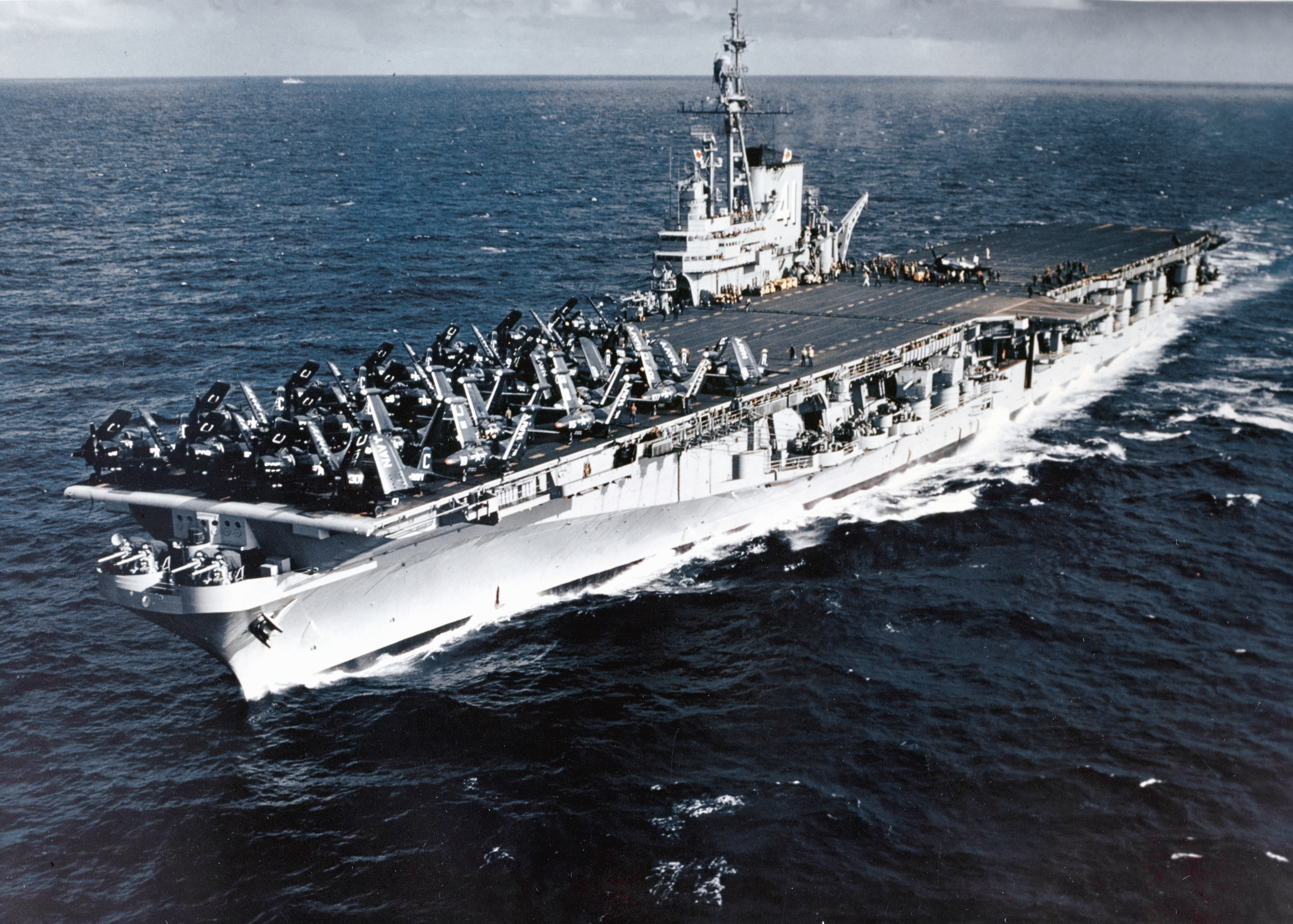
- USS Midway before SCB-110 upgrade

Class overview
- Name: Midway class
- Builders: Newport News Shipbuilding; New York Navy Yard
- Operators: United States Navy
- Preceded by: Essex class
- Succeeded by: United States class (planned); Forrestal class (actual)
- Subclasses: USS Coral Sea
- Built: 27 October 1943 – 2 April 1946
- In commission: 10 September 1945 – 11 April 1992
- Planned: 6
- Completed: 3
- Canceled: 3
- Retired: 3
- Preserved: 1

General characteristics
- Type: Aircraft carrier
- Displacement: 45,000 long tons (45,722 t) (standard); 60,000 long tons (60,963 t) (full load)
- Length: 968 ft (295 m) overall; 901 ft (275 m) waterline; 924 ft (282 m) flight deck
- Beam: 113 ft (34 m) Waterline; 136 ft (41 m) Overall
- Draft: 33 ft (10 m)
- Installed power: 12 Babcock and Wilcox boilers
- Propulsion: Westinghouse Steam turbines; 212,000 shp (158,000 kW)
- Speed: 33 knots (61 km/h; 38 mph)
- Complement: 4,104
- Sensors & processing systems: As Built: 1 × SC-2 Surveillance Radar; 2 × SG Surface Search Radars; 1 × SK-2 Air Search Radars; 2 × Mk-37 GFCS
- Electronic warfare & decoys: As Built: 1 × TDY-2 ECM (Anti-Radar)
- Armament: Original armament of Midway and Franklin D. Rosevelt: 18 × 5 in (127 mm)/54 caliber guns; 21 × quad 40 mm Bofors gun; 28 × twin 20 mm Oerlikon cannon; Original armament of Coral Sea: 14 × 5 in (127 mm)/54 caliber guns; 20 × twin 3"/50 caliber guns; 14 × twin Oerlikon 20 mm cannons; Refit armament: 2 × 8-cell Sea Sparrow launchers; 2 × Mark 71 mod 0 Phalanx CIWS
- Armor: Portside Belt: 7.6 inch; Starboard Belt: 7 inch; Lower Edge and Upper Belt: 1.96 inch; Flight Deck: 3.5 inch; Hangar Deck: 2 inch; Main Deck: 2 inch
- Aircraft carried: Up to 130 (1940s–50s), 65–70 (1980s)
- Aviation facilities: Original Aviation Facilities: 2 Centerline Aircraft Elevators; 1 Deck Edge Elevator; 2 Aircraft Catapults; 2 Hangar Decks; 1950s Modernizations: 1 Centerline Aircraft Elevator; 2 Deck Edge Elevators; 3 Steam Catapults; Angled Flight Deck; 1970s Modernizations for USS Midway: 3 Deck Edge Aircraft Elevators; 2 Steam Catapults; Enlarged Angled Flight Deck

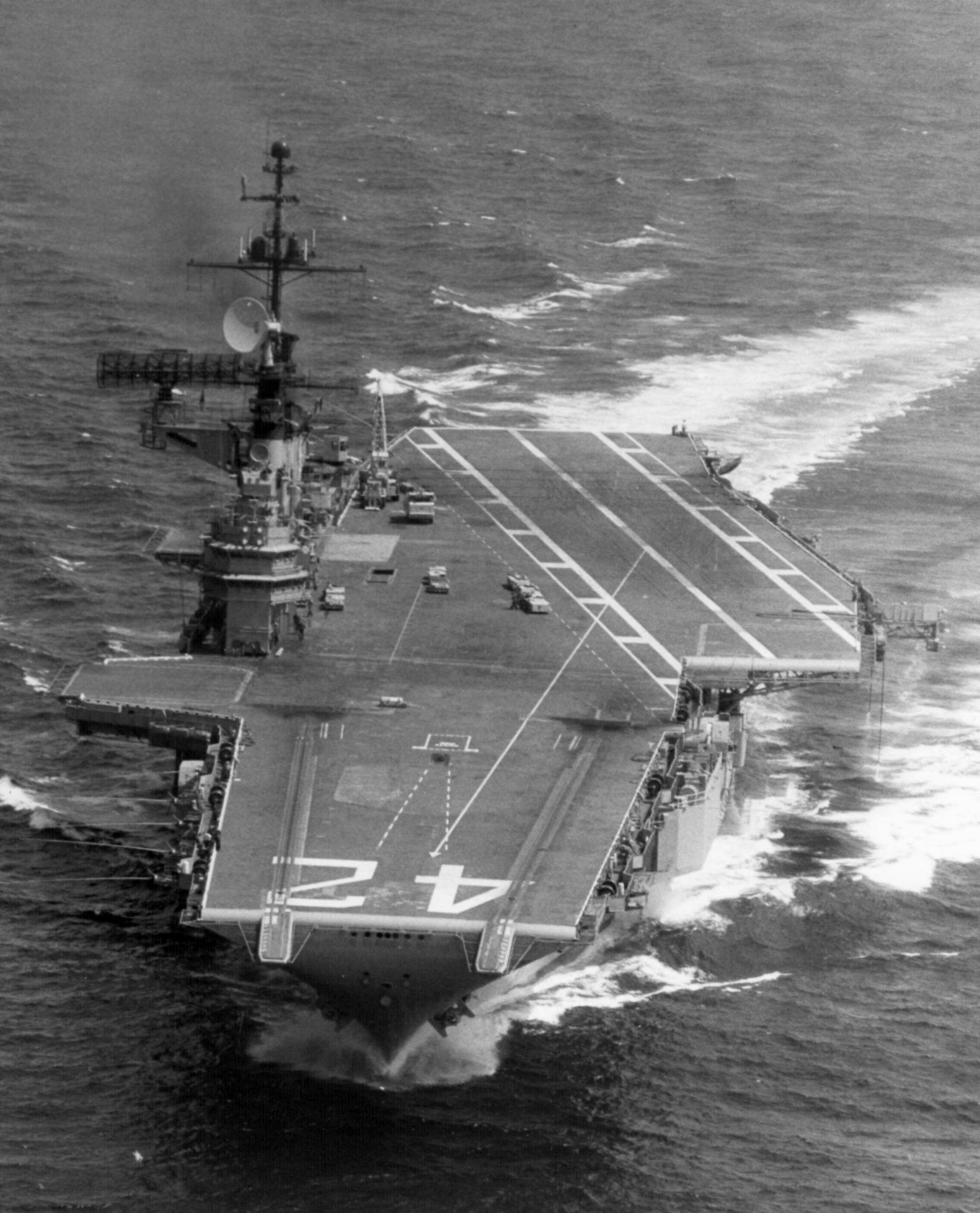
Franklin D. Roosevelt under way in 1969

The Midway class was a class of three United States Navy aircraft carriers. The lead ship, USS Midway, was commissioned in September 1945 and decommissioned in 1992. USS Franklin D. Roosevelt was commissioned in October 1945 and taken out of service in 1977. USS Coral Sea was commissioned in April 1947 and decommissioned in 1990.

== History ==
=== 1940s ===
The CVB-41-class vessels (then unnamed) were originally conceived in 1940 as a design study to determine the effect of including an armored flight deck on a carrier the size of the Essex class. The resulting calculations showed that the effect would be a reduction of air group size—the resulting ship would have an air group of 64, compared to 90–100 for the standard Essex-class fleet carriers. As it progressed, the design also became heavily influenced by the wartime experience of the Royal Navy's armored carriers:

As a result of study of damage sustained by various British carriers prior to our entry into the war, two important departures from traditional U.S. Navy carrier design were incorporated in the CVB class, then still under development. HMS Illustrious in an action off Malta on 1 January 1941 was hit by several bombs, three of which detonated in the hangar space. Large fires swept fore and aft among parked planes, thereby demonstrating the desirability of attempting to confine the limits of such explosions and fires by structural sectionalization of the hangar space. On the CVB Class, the hangar was therefore divided into five compartments separated by 40- and 50-pound special treatment steel (STS) division bulkheads extending from the hangar deck to the flight deck, each fitted with a large door suitable for handling aircraft. This sectionalization, in conjunction with sprinkler and fog foam systems, was hoped to prevent fires from spreading throughout the hangar spaces effectively, as occurred on USS Franklin on 30 October and 19 March. The damage experiences of several British carriers, which unlike US carriers were fitted with armored flight decks, demonstrated the effectiveness of such armor in shielding hangar spaces from GP bombs and vital spaces below the hangar deck from semiarmor-piercing bombs. Accordingly, the CVB Class was designed with an armored flight deck consisting of 3-1/2-inch STS from frames 46 to 175 with a hangar deck consisting of two courses of 40-pound STS between frames 36 and 192. Although none of the CVB Class carriers were completed in time to take part in war operations, the effectiveness of armored flight decks against Kamikaze attacks was demonstrated by various carriers attached to the British Pacific Fleet…

—

The concept went to finding a larger carrier that could support both deck armor and a sufficiently large air group. The weight savings needed to armor the flight deck were achieved by removing the planned cruiser-caliber battery of 8-inch (203 mm) guns and reducing the 5-inch antiaircraft battery from dual to single mounts. Unlike the Royal Navy's aircraft carriers, for which the armored deck was part of the ship structure, the Midway class retained their "strength deck" at the hangar deck level and the armored flight deck was part of the superstructure. They would be the last USN carriers to be so designed; the immense size of the succeeding Forrestal-class supercarriers would require a new deep-hulled design carrying the strength deck at the flight deck level to produce a stronger and lighter hull.

The heavily subdivided arrangement of the machinery spaces was based on that of the Montana-class battleship, while the two inner propeller shafts were partially enclosed in skegs, similar to contemporary battleship construction. While the Essex-class carriers had eight main engineering compartments, the Midway class had 26, including 12 boiler rooms well off the centerline and four widely separated engine rooms. More extensive use of electric arc welding than in previous warships reduced the weight by about 10% of what would have been required for riveted structural assembly.

The resulting Midway-class carriers were very large, with the ability to accommodate more planes than any other carrier in the U.S. fleet (30–40 more aircraft than the Essex class). In their original configuration, the Midway-class ships had airwings of up to 130 aircraft. The coordination of so many planes was soon realized to be beyond the effective command-and-control ability of one ship, but their size did allow these ships more easily to accommodate the rapid growth in aircraft size and weight that took place in the early jet age. The forward flight deck was designed for launching 13-ton aircraft, and the aft flight deck was designed for landing 11-ton aircraft, assuming in-flight expenditure of fuel and ordnance.

While the resulting ships featured excellent protection and unprecedented airwing size, they also had several undesirable characteristics. Internally, the ships were very cramped and crowded. Freeboard was unusually low for such large carriers; in heavy seas, they shipped large amounts of water (only partially mitigated by the fitting of a hurricane bow during the SCB-110/110A upgrades) and corkscrewed in a manner that hampered landing operations. The follow-up Forrestal-class featured a deeper hull that had more freeboard and better seakeeping.

In contrast with the earlier Lexington, Yorktown, and Essex classes, the beam (width) of the Midway class meant that they could not pass through the Panama Canal.

Although they were intended to augment the US Pacific fleet during World War II, the lead ship of the class, Midway, was not commissioned until 10 September 1945, eight days after the surrender of Japan.

While Midway and Coral Sea followed the USN's policy of naming aircraft carriers after battles (two Casablanca-class escort carriers gave up their names for the larger ships), USS Franklin D. Roosevelt inaugurated the policy of naming aircraft carriers after former US Presidents that the US Navy generally follows today.

=== 1950s ===
None of the class went on war cruises during the Korean War. As the three ships became essential to the Navy's strategic nuclear-weapons role in Europe, they were mainly deployed to the Atlantic and Mediterranean. Until the availability of the Forrestal class, they were the premier commands sought by senior naval aviators. They were "admiral makers" for many of their commanding officers, including future chiefs of Naval Operations, George Whelan Anderson Jr. and David L. McDonald.

During the 1950s, Midway and Franklin D. Roosevelt underwent the SCB-110 modernization program (similar to SCB-125 for the Essex class), which added angled flight decks, steam catapults, mirror landing systems, and other modifications that allowed them to operate a new generation of larger and heavier naval aircraft. Coral Sea had a variant modernization program called SCB-110A with an angled deck 3° greater than the other two.

=== 1960s ===
All three of the Midway class made combat deployments in the Vietnam War. Coral Sea deployed to the Gulf of Tonkin six times, Midway deployed on three occasions, and Franklin D. Roosevelt made one combat deployment before returning to the Mediterranean.

In the late 1960s, Midway underwent an extensive modernization and reconstruction program under SCB 101.66, which proved to be controversial and expensive, thus was not repeated on the other ships. While $82 million had been budgeted for the modernization, the actual cost was $202 million, in comparison to $277 million for simultaneous construction of the brand-new USS John F. Kennedy.

Roosevelt instead received an austere $46 million refit (SCB 103.68), enabling her to operate the Grumman A-6 Intruder and LTV A-7 Corsair II. In July 1968, Roosevelt entered Norfolk Naval Shipyard for her 11-month modernization program. The forward centerline elevator was relocated to the starboard deck edge forward of the island, the port waist catapult was removed, the crew spaces were refurbished, and all of the four remaining 5-inch (127 mm) antiaircraft turrets were removed. Roosevelt set sail with four 5-inch guns, two on either side controlled by three Mk 56 gunfire control systems and one Mk 37 system. Roosevelt also received a deck-edge spray system using the new seawater-compatible fire-fighting chemical, Light Water. She put to sea again on 26 May 1969.

=== 1970s ===
By the 1970s, Franklin D. Roosevelt and Coral Sea were showing their age. All three retained the McDonnell Douglas F-4 Phantom II in their air wings, being too small to operate the new Grumman F-14 Tomcat fleet defense fighter or the S-3 Viking antisubmarine jet. In 1977, Franklin D. Roosevelt was decommissioned, as she was the least modernized and in poor condition compared to the others in her class. On her final deployment, Roosevelt embarked AV-8 Harrier jump jets to test the concept of including vertical/short takeoff and landing aircraft in a carrier air wing.

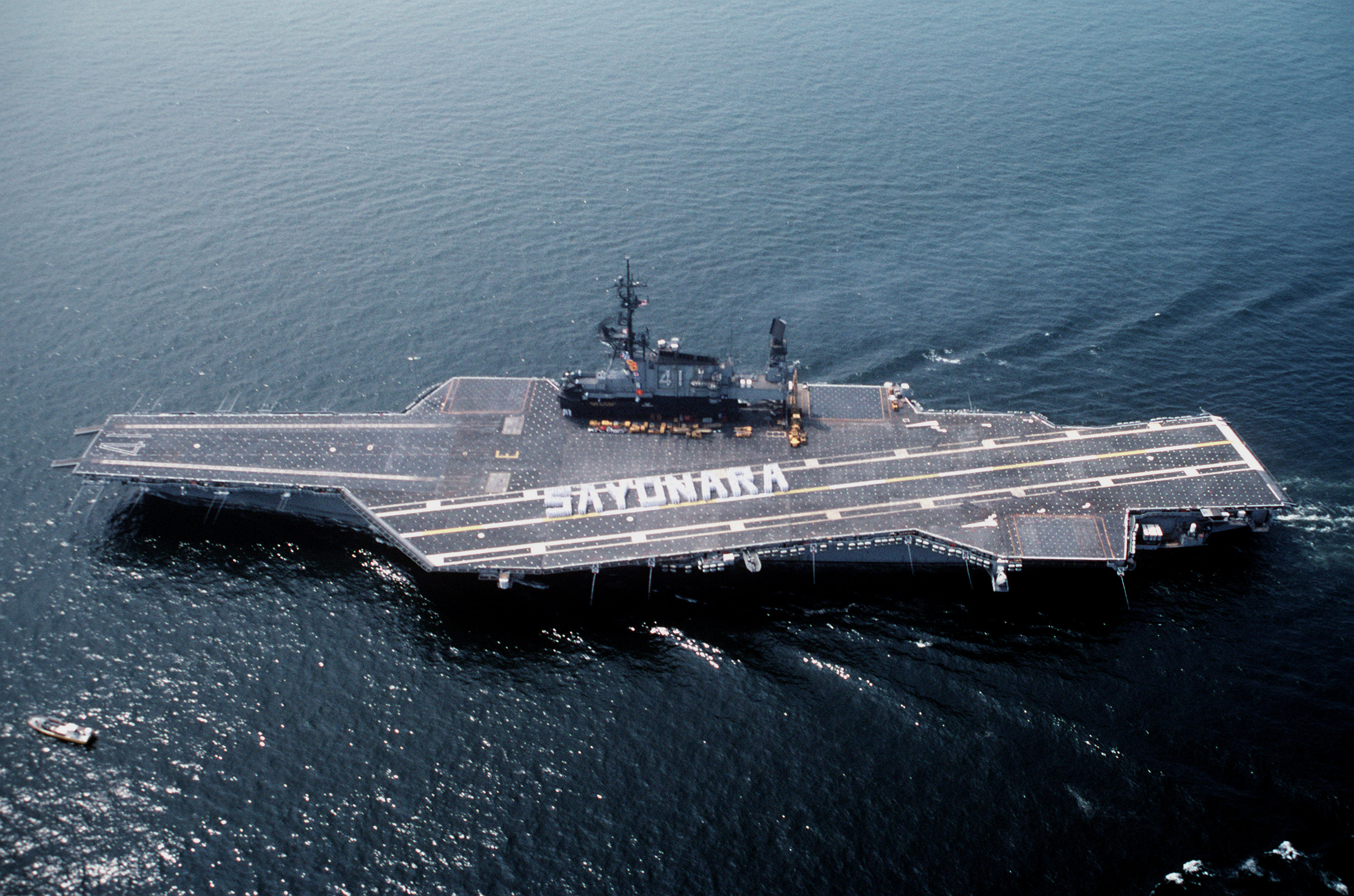
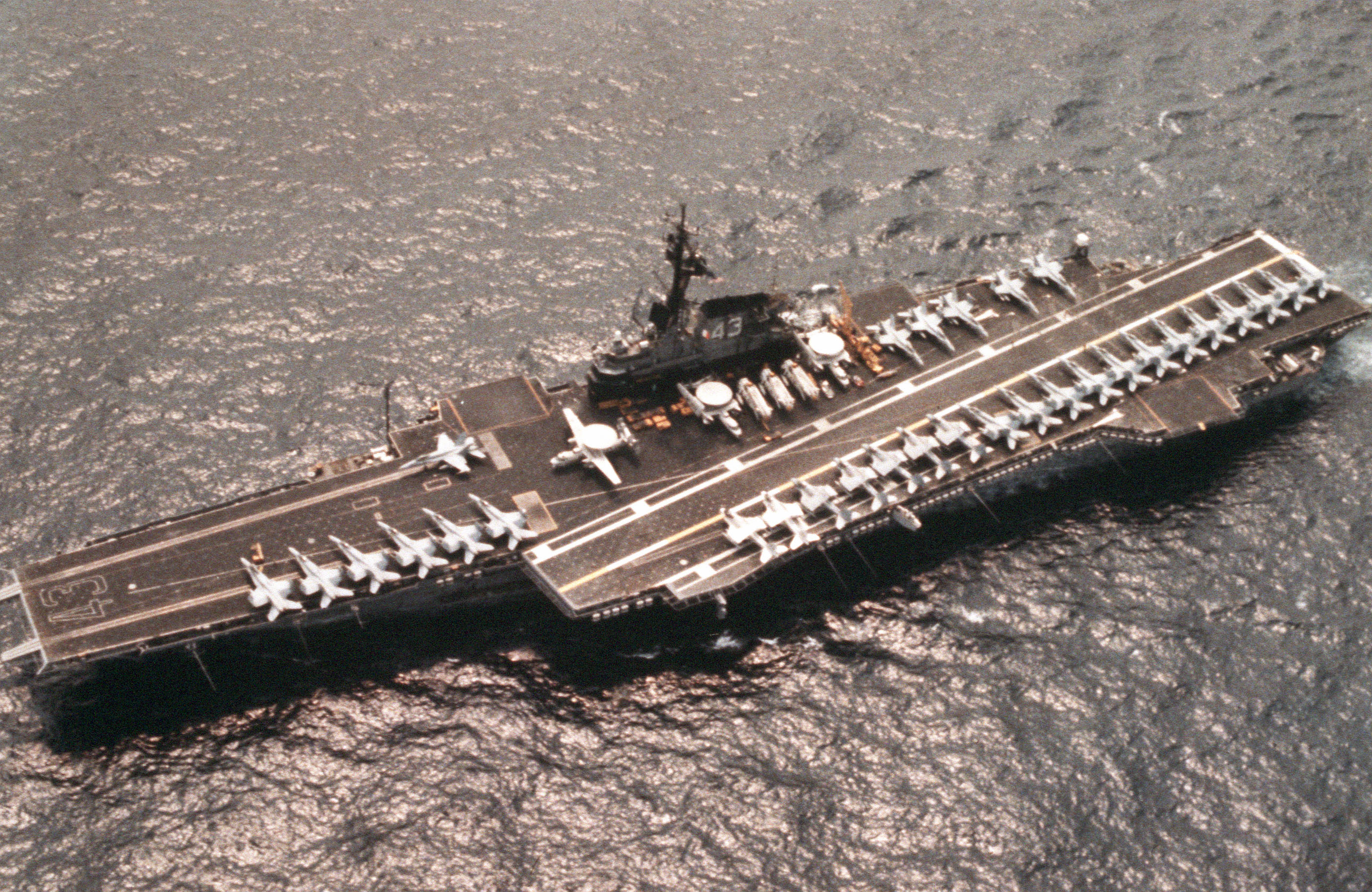
Midway (above/left) and Coral Sea (above/right) in the 1980s: The differences in their appearances at this late stage in their service is due to Midway's extensive rebuild in the late 1960s (SCB 101.66), which was not carried out on Coral Sea.

=== 1980s ===
Coral Sea was rescued from imminent decommissioning by the election of Ronald Reagan as President of the United States in 1980. Reagan's proposed 600-ship Navy gave the remaining ships a new lease on life. Coral Sea underwent extensive refits to address the ship's poor condition.

When the McDonnell Douglas F/A-18 Hornet became operational in the mid-1980s, the Navy quickly deployed them to the Midway and Coral Sea to replace the older F-4s. On 15 April 1986, aircraft from Coral Sea, as well as USAF F-111Fs from RAF Lakenheath in the UK, struck targets in Libya as part of Operation El Dorado Canyon. The Hornets went into action for the first time, flying several ship-to-shore air strikes against Libyan shore installations that were harassing the fleet. During this action, the Hornets from Coral Sea attacked and destroyed the SA-5 missile (SAM) site at Sirte, which had been "painting" U.S. aircraft with its radars. This was the combat debut for the Hornet and incidentally marked the first combat use of the AGM-88 HARM antiradiation missile. The Hornets attacked the SAM sites in bad weather and at wave-top heights. All of them returned without mishap.

A 1986 refit for Midway removed her 6-inch armor belt and bulged her hull to try to increase freeboard. While successful in this regard, the bulges also resulted in a dangerously fast rolling period that prevented Midway from operating aircraft in heavy seas. The bulging, therefore, was not repeated on Coral Sea.

=== 1990s ===
The Reagan era reprieve could not last. In 1990, Coral Sea, which had long since earned the nickname "Ageless Warrior", was decommissioned. She had one last war in which to participate, and she was one of the six aircraft carriers deployed by the U.S. against Iraq during Operation Desert Storm. A few months after the campaign, Midway was decommissioned.

Coral Sea was slowly scrapped at Baltimore, as legal and environmental troubles continually delayed her fate. Midway spent five years in the mothball fleet at Bremerton, Washington, before being taken over by a museum group. The ship is now open to the public at the USS Midway Museum in San Diego, California.

== Ships in class ==
Name	Hull no.	Builder	Laid down	Launched	Commissioned	Decommissioned	Fate
Midway	CV-41; CVB-41; CVA-41	Newport News Shipbuilding and Dockyard Co., Newport News	27 October 1943	20 March 1945	10 September 1945	11 April 1992	Museum ship at San Diego
Franklin D. Roosevelt (ex-Coral Sea)	CV-42; CVB-42; CVA-42	New York Naval Shipyard, New York City	1 December 1943	29 April 1945	27 October 1945	30 September 1977	Broken up at Kearny, 1978
Coral Sea	CV-43; CVB-43; CVA-43	Newport News Shipbuilding and Dockyard Co., Newport News	10 July 1944	2 April 1946	1 October 1947	26 April 1990	Broken up at Baltimore, 2000
unnamed	CVB-44	Newport News Shipbuilding and Dockyard Co., Newport News	Cancelled 11 January 1943				
unnamed	CVB-56	Newport News Shipbuilding and Dockyard Co., Newport News	Cancelled 28 March 1945				
unnamed	CVB-57	Newport News Shipbuilding and Dockyard Co., Newport News	Cancelled 28 March 1945				

Hull codes;

- CV – Fleet/multipurpose carrier
- CVA – Attack carrier
- CVB – Large carrier

== See also ==
- List of aircraft carriers
- List of aircraft carriers of the United States Navy
- Naval aviation
