= Frederick J. Becton =

United States Navy admiral (1908–1995)

Frederick Julian Becton
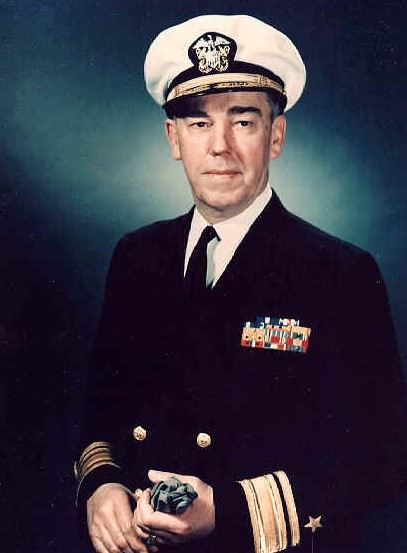
- Born: May 15, 1908; Des Arc, Arkansas, U.S.
- Died: December 25, 1995 (aged 87); Wynnewood, Pennsylvania, U.S.
- Burial place: Arlington National Cemetery
- Military career
- Allegiance: United States
- Branch: United States Navy
- Service years: 1931–1966
- Rank: Rear Admiral
- Commands: USS Aaron Ward; USS Laffey; Destroyer Division 202; USS Glynn; USS Iowa; Cruiser Division 5 Mine Force, Pacific Fleet; Naval Base, Los Angeles, California; Naval Reserve Training Command
- Conflicts: World War II
- Awards: Navy Cross; Silver Star (4); Croix de Guerre (France)

Rear Admiral Frederick Julian Becton (May 15, 1908 – December 25, 1995) was a decorated United States Navy officer. He is probably best remembered for commanding the destroyer USS Laffey in World War II during an intense Japanese kamikaze attack.

== Early life ==
Becton was born in Des Arc, Arkansas, on May 15, 1908 to John E. and Ruby Brown Becton. He attended Hot Springs High School. In high school, he dated future actress and musician Imogen Carpenter.

== Naval career ==
=== Pre-war ===
Becton graduated from the United States Naval Academy in 1931 and was commissioned an ensign in the United States Navy on June 4 of that year. He was promoted to lieutenant (junior grade) exactly three years later and to lieutenant on July 1, 1939. He served on the battleships USS Texas and USS Arkansas, then the destroyers USS Preston and USS Breckinridge, the gunboat USS Guam, and the destroyers USS Pope and USS Gleaves.

=== World War II ===
When the United States entered World War II, Becton was the executive officer of the destroyer USS Aaron Ward. He was promoted to lieutenant commander on June 15, 1942. On April 7, 1943, now in command of Aaron Ward, he was escorting three landing craft tanks to Savo Island. As they approached Tulagi harbor, he was ordered to go to the aid of USS LST-449 off Togoma Point, Guadalcanal. One of the passengers aboard the Landing Ship, Tank was then-Lieutenant (junior grade) John F. Kennedy, on his way to take command of Motor Torpedo Boat PT-109. While escorting LST-449 and several other small craft to safety, Aaron Ward was attacked by three Aichi D3A "Val" dive bombers, then three more bombers. Aaron Ward sustained such damage that she sank that evening. The casualties were 20 men killed, 59 wounded and seven missing.

Becton was awarded the first of four Silver Stars "for conspicuous gallantry and intrepidity as Operations Officer on the Staff of Commander, Destroyer Squadron Twenty-one" in combat in night engagements in the Solomon Islands campaign in July and August 1943.

Made a commander on November 1, Becton was the commanding officer of USS Laffey during the invasion of Normandy on June 6, 1944. The ship was struck by an 8-inch shell, which did not explode. Laffey broke up an attack by German E-boats on June 12 and bombarded Cherbourg on June 25. Becton was awarded a second Silver Star for his actions in June. Transferred back to the Pacific Theater, he received his third Silver Star for his handling of Laffey in support of the landing of the 77th Division at Ormoc Bay, Leyte, the Philippines, on December 7, 1944. His fourth was for entering the "restricted waters of Lingayen Gulf during the initial bombardment and assault at Luzon" in January 1945. In February, Laffey escorted aircraft carriers in airstrikes against Tokyo.

On April 16, 1945, Laffey came under attack from 22 or 30 Japanese kamikaze and bomber aircraft while on radar picket duty off Okinawa. In a battle lasting 79 minutes, the ship was struck by five, six or eight kamikazes and two bombs, but Becton refused to abandon his ship. For his "unremitting tenacity of purpose, courageous leadership and heroic devotion to duty under fire", Becton was awarded the Navy Cross. The ship had to be towed to Seattle. Among his other decorations were the Croix de Guerre with Gold Star, awarded by the French government, and two Presidential Unit Citations.

=== Post-war ===
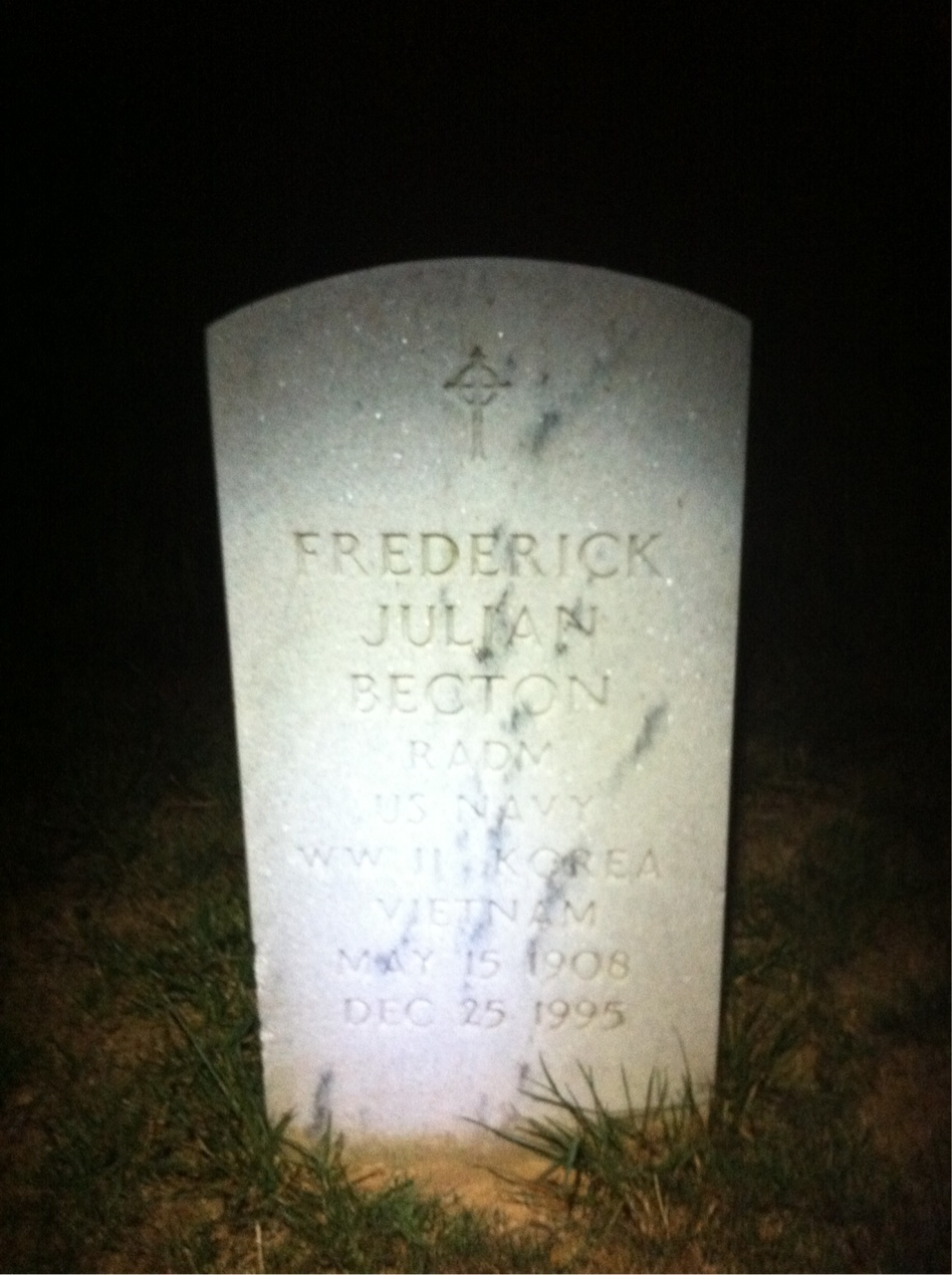
Grave at Arlington National Cemetery

On January 1, 1951, Becton was promoted to captain. He completed the Personnel Administration and Training course at Northwestern University in June 1948, and after duty as Executive Officer of USS Manchester from September 1948 to April 1949, served for fifteen month as commander of Destroyer Division 202. He worked again in the Bureau of Naval Personnel, and after brief instruction in 1952, commanded the transport ship USS Glynn for two years. He completed a tour of duty in the Office of Chief of Naval Operations as Assistant to the Director of the Surface-Type Warfare Division and Head of the Combined and Joint Training, and under orders of September 20, 1956, commanded the battleship USS Iowa.

Assigned to the Department of the Navy in 1958, he was Director of the Enlisted Personnel Division, Bureau of Naval Personnel and later had instruction in the Office of the Chief of Naval Operations. He next served as Executive Officer to the Personnel Directorate, Joint Staff, Joint Chiefs of Staff, Washington, D.C. He became a rear admiral effective December 1, 1959.

In September 1959, he became Commander of Cruiser Division Five, and in July 1960 was assigned additional duty as Commander Mine Force, Pacific Fleet. A month later, he relinquished command of Cruiser Division Five, continuing to command Mine Force, Pacific Fleet and from September 30, 1960, also served as Commander Naval Base, Los Angeles, California. In October 1964 he reported as Commander, Naval Reserve Training Command, at Omaha, Nebraska.

Becton retired from the Navy in 1966 and moved with his wife Elizabeth (née Reuss) to her hometown of Wynnewood, Pennsylvania. He wrote a book about Laffey entitled The Ship That Would Not Die, published by Prentice-Hall in 1980.

== Death ==
Becton died at the age of 87 on Christmas Day 1995 at his home in Wynnewood. He was interred at Arlington National Cemetery. He was survived by Elizabeth, his wife of 46 years, and their two daughters.

== Awards and decorations ==
His awards include:

Navy Cross		Silver Star w/ three 5/16" Gold Stars
Navy Commendation Medal w/ "V" device and one 5/16" Gold Star	Navy Presidential Unit Citation w/ two 3/16" Bronze Stars	China Service Medal
American Defense Service Medal w/ bronze "A" Device	American Campaign Medal	European-African-Middle Eastern Campaign Medal w/ one 3/16" Bronze Star
Asiatic-Pacific Campaign Medal w/ one 3/16" Silver Star and two 3/16" Bronze Stars	World War II Victory Medal	National Defense Service Medal
Philippine Liberation Medal w/ two 3/16" bronze stars	Philippine Republic Presidential Unit Citation	Croix de Guerre w/ Gold Star

=== Navy Cross ===
For extraordinary heroism as Commanding Officer of the USS Laffey in action against enemy Japanese forces off Okinawa, on April 16, 1945. With his ship under savage attack by thirty hostile planes, Commander Becton skillfully countered the fanatical enemy tactics, employing every conceivable maneuver and directing all his guns in an intense and unrelenting barrage of fire to protect his ship against the terrific onslaught. Crashed by six of the overwhelming aerial force which penetrated the deadly antiaircraft defense, the USS Laffey, under his valiant command fought fiercely for over two hours against the attackers, blasting eight of the enemy out of the sky. Although explosions of the suicide planes and two additional bombs caused severe structural damage, loss of armament and heavy personnel casualties, Commander Becton retained complete control of his ship, coolly directing emergency repairs in the midst of furious combat, and emerged at the close of the action with his gallant warship afloat and still an effective fighting unit...

=== Silver Star ===
For conspicuous gallantry and intrepidity as Operations Officer on the Staff of Commander Destroyer Squadron Twenty-One on the Flagship USS Nicholas in night engagements with enemy surface forces n the Solomon Islands Area, July 5 to 13 and August 17–18, 1943. With complete understanding of objectives and tactics, (he) expertly assisted and advised his Squadron commander in controlling and coordinating the attacks of the vanguard destroyers of a cruiser-destroyer force in which several enemy ships were sunk and many damaged. In a subsequent skillfully planned assault, his flagship led a destroyer division against an attacking force and by combined gun and torpedo fire, caused the destruction of two destroyers, severe damage to a third and the annihilation of a number of landing barges...

=== Silver Star ===
For meritorious performance of duty as Commanding Officer of the USS Laffey during the amphibious assault on Normandy, France in June 1944, and the bombardment of enemy defenses at Cherbourg, France, June 25, 1944. Commander Becton maneuvered his ship through heavily mined waters and under heavy and accurately controlled gunfire from enemy shore batteries, protecting vessels in the Western Task Force Area from enemy surface forces and submarines. During the bombardment of Cherbourg, though the USS Laffey suffered light damage from superior enemy gunfire and was subjected to further heavy and accurate fire (he) courageously maintained a continuous fire on the superior batteries to cover the retirement of the minesweepers and battleships, and…interposed himself between the shore batteries and the other units of the bombardment group to divert the fire of the shore batteries from those units. Later in the action when again subjected to heavy enemy fire that straddled the USS Laffey, (he) skillfully maneuvered his ship to evade the fire and placed his ship in a position to cover with gunfire or smoke the battleships then retiring out of range of enemy batteries...

=== Silver Star ===
For conspicuous gallantry and intrepidity as Commanding Officer of the USS Laffey during action against enemy Japanese forces off Ormoc Bay, Layte, Philippine Islands, on December 7, 1944. Fighting his ship gallantly in the face of withering fire from hostile shore batteries and constant attack by enemy aircraft, Commander Becton boldly directed the Laffey’s accurate, determined gunfire against the heavily fortified hostile shores to neutralize Japanese defenses and pave the way for our assaulting troops. With a strong force of enemy aircraft attempting to bomb and crash our ships during retirement, he brought his powerful antiaircraft guns to bear with deadly accuracy, thereby providing an effective screen for the convoy and insuring a safe withdrawal...

=== Silver Star ===
For conspicuous gallantry and intrepidity as Commanding Officer of the USS Laffey during action against enemy Japanese forces in the Philippine Islands Area in January 1945. Boldly penetrating dangerous restricted waters of Lingayen Gulf during the initial bombardment and assault at Luzon, Commander Becton fought his ship gallantly despite persistent attacks by hostile aircraft and devastating fire directed from Japanese shore batteries, successfully carrying out extensive antiaircraft screening missions, and bombardment of heavily fortified positions on the beach and providing effective fire support for underwater demolition units. By his ship-handling, brilliant leadership and zealous devotion to duty in the face of grave peril, (he) contributed materially to the success of our forces in recapturing the Philippines...
