= USS Yorktown (CV-10) =

Essex-class aircraft carrier of the US Navy

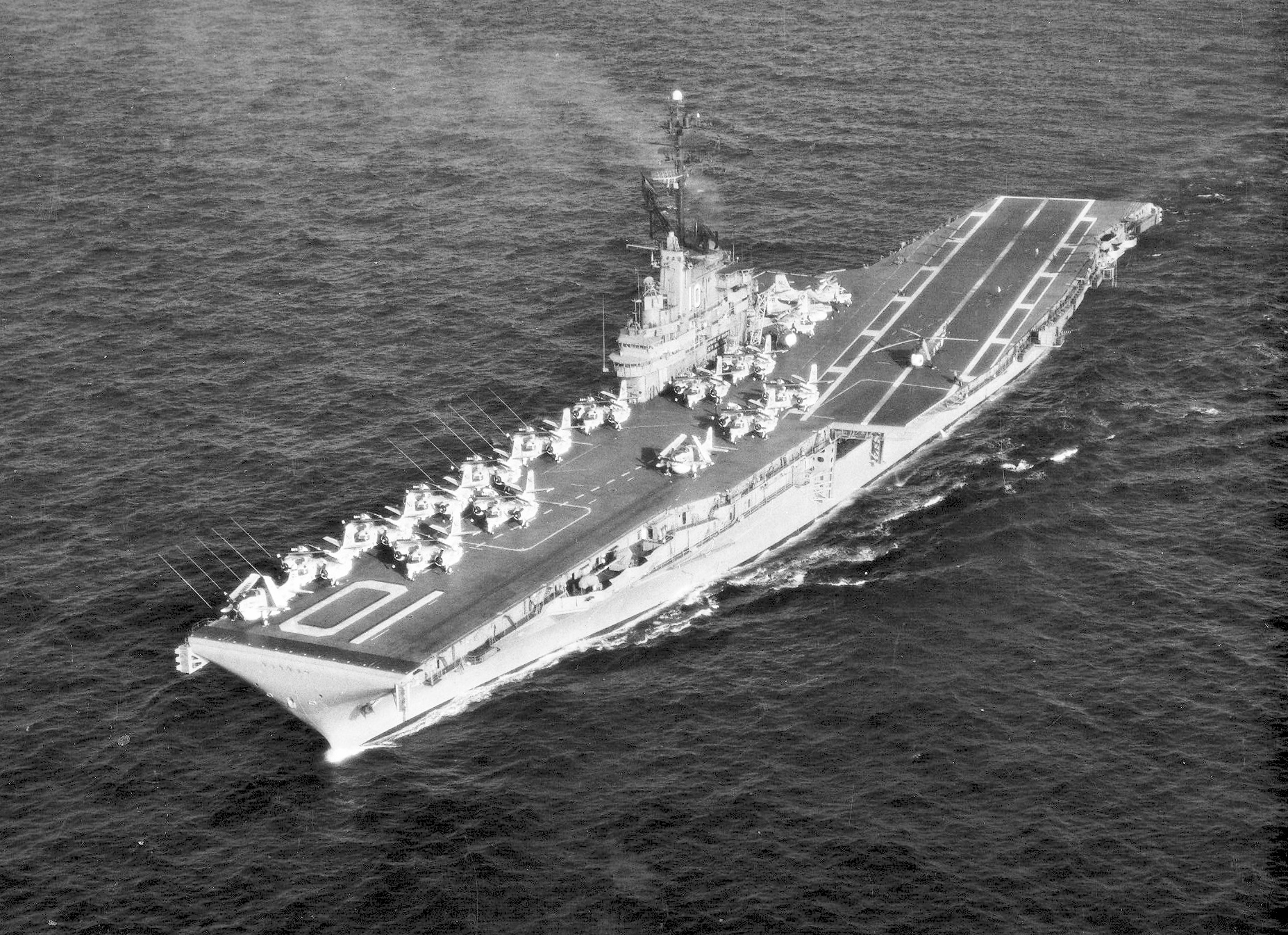
- USS Yorktown at sea in the Pacific, 1963

History

United States
- Name: Yorktown
- Namesake: Battle of Yorktown; USS Yorktown (CV-5)
- Ordered: 3 July 1940
- Builder: Newport News Shipbuilding
- Laid down: 1 December 1941
- Launched: 21 January 1943
- Acquired: 15 April 1943
- Commissioned: 15 April 1943
- Decommissioned: 9 January 1947
- Nickname(s): The Fighting Lady
- Recommissioned: 2 January 1953
- Decommissioned: 27 June 1970
- Reclassified: CVA-10, 1 October 1952; CVS-10, 1 September 1957
- Stricken: 1 June 1973
- Status: Museum ship at Patriots Point in Mount Pleasant, South Carolina

General characteristics as built
- Class & type: Essex-class aircraft carrier
- Displacement: 27,100 long tons (27,500 t) (standard); 36,380 long tons (36,960 t) (full load)
- Length: 820 feet (249.9 m) (wl); 872 feet (265.8 m) (o/a)
- Beam: 93 ft (28.3 m)
- Draft: 34 ft 2 in (10.41 m)
- Installed power: 8 × Babcock & Wilcox boilers; 150,000 shp (110,000 kW)
- Propulsion: 4 × geared steam turbines; 4 × screw propellers
- Speed: 33 knots (61 km/h; 38 mph)
- Range: 14,100 nmi (26,100 km; 16,200 mi) at 20 knots (37 km/h; 23 mph)
- Complement: 2,600 officers and enlisted men
- Armament: 12 × 5 in (127 mm) DP guns; 32 × 40 mm (1.6 in) AA guns; 46 × 20 mm (0.8 in) AA guns
- Armor: Waterline belt: 2.5–4 in (64–102 mm); Deck: 1.5 in (38 mm); Hangar deck: 2.5 in (64 mm); Bulkheads: 4 in (102 mm)
- Aircraft carried: 90-100 aircraft
- Patriots Point Naval & Maritime Museum
- U.S. National Register of Historic Places
- U.S. National Historic Landmark
- Location within South Carolina
- Nearest city: Mount Pleasant
- Coordinates: 32°47′26″N 79°54′31″W
- Built: 1941
- Architect: Newport News Shipbldg. & Dry Dock
- NRHP reference No.: 82001519

Significant dates
- Added to NRHP: 10 November 1982
- Designated NHL: 19 June 1980

USS Yorktown (CV/CVA/CVS-10) is one of 24 Essex-class aircraft carriers built during World War II for the United States Navy. Initially to have been named Bonhomme Richard, she was renamed Yorktown while still under construction, after the Yorktown-class aircraft carrier USS Yorktown (CV-5), which was sunk at the Battle of Midway. She is the fourth U.S. Navy ship to bear the name, though the previous ships were named for the 1781 Battle of Yorktown. Yorktown was commissioned in April 1943, and participated in several campaigns in the Pacific Theater of Operations, earning 11 battle stars and the Presidential Unit Citation.

Decommissioned shortly after the end of the war, she was modernized and recommissioned in February 1953 as an attack carrier (CVA), and served with distinction during the Korean War. The ship was later modernized again with a canted deck, eventually becoming an anti-submarine carrier (CVS) and served for many years in the Pacific, including duty in the Vietnam War, during which she earned five battle stars. The carrier served as a recovery ship for the December, 1968, Apollo 8 space mission, the first crewed ship to reach and orbit the Moon, and was used in the 1970 film Tora! Tora! Tora!, which recreated the Japanese attack on Pearl Harbor, and in the 1984 science fiction film The Philadelphia Experiment.

Yorktown was decommissioned in 1970 and in 1975 became a museum ship at Patriots Point, Mount Pleasant, South Carolina, where she was designated a National Historic Landmark.

== Construction and commissioning ==
Work was begun on Bonhomme Richard when her keel was laid down on 1 December 1941 at Newport News, Virginia, by the Newport News Shipbuilding & Drydock Company, six days before the Attack on Pearl Harbor. She was renamed on 26 September 1942 as USS Yorktown to commemorate the loss of USS Yorktown (CV-5) during the Battle of Midway in June 1942, and launched on 21 January 1943, sponsored by Eleanor Roosevelt. Yorktown was commissioned on 15 April 1943, with Captain Joseph J. Clark in command.

== Service history ==
=== World War II ===
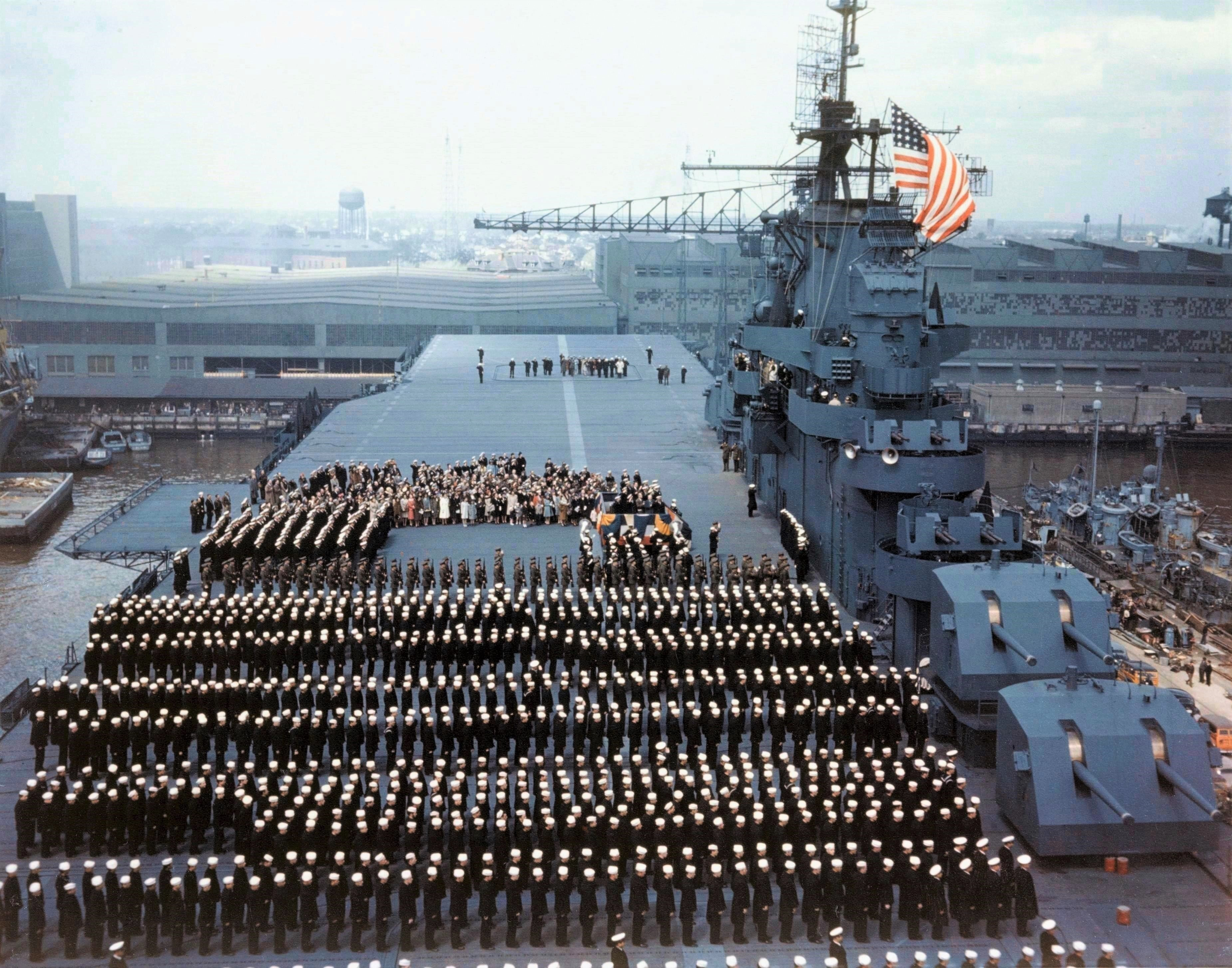
Commissioning of USS Yorktown on 15 April 1943

Yorktown remained in the Naval Station Norfolk area until 21 May 1943, when she got underway for shakedown training in the vicinity of Trinidad. She returned to Norfolk on 17 June and began post-shakedown availability. The aircraft carrier completed repairs on 1 July and began air operations out of Norfolk until 6 July, when she exited Chesapeake Bay on her way to the Pacific Ocean. She transited the Panama Canal on 11 July and departed Balboa, Panama, on 12 July. The warship arrived in Pearl Harbor on 24 July and began a month of exercises in the Hawaiian Islands. On 22 August, she stood out of Pearl Harbor, bound for her first combat of the war. Her task force, TF 15, arrived at the launching point about 128 miles (206 km) from Marcus Island early on the morning of 31 August. She spent most of that day launching fighter and bomber strikes on Marcus Island before beginning the retirement to Hawaii that evening. The aircraft carrier reentered Pearl Harbor on 7 September and remained there for two days.

On 9 September, she stood out to sea, bound for the West Coast of the United States. She arrived in San Francisco on 13 September, loaded aircraft and supplies, and returned to sea on 15 September. Four days later, the aircraft carrier reentered Pearl Harbor. Yorktown returned to sea to conduct combat operations on 29 September. Early on the morning of 5 October, she began two days of air strikes on Japanese installations on Wake Island. After retiring to the east for the night, she resumed those air raids early on the morning of 6 October and continued them through most of the day. That evening, the task group began its retirement to Hawaii. Yorktown arrived at Oahu on 11 October and, for the next month, conducted air training operations out of Pearl Harbor.

==== Marshall and Gilbert Islands ====
On 10 November, Yorktown departed Pearl Harbor in company with Task Force 38—the Fast Carrier Task Force, Pacific Fleet—to participate in her first major assault operation, the occupation of the Gilbert Islands. On 19 November, she arrived at the launch point near Jaluit and Mili Atoll and, early that morning, launched the first of a series of raids to suppress enemy airpower during the amphibious assaults on Tarawa, Abemama, and Makin. The next day, she sent raids back to the airfield at Jaluit; some of her planes also supported the troops wresting Makin from the Japanese. On 22 November, her air group concentrated upon installations and planes at Mili once again. Before returning to Pearl Harbor, the aircraft carrier made passing raids on the installations at Wotje and Kwajalein Atolls on 4 December. The warship reentered Pearl Harbor on 9 December and began a month of air training operations in the Hawaiian Islands.

On 16 January 1944, the warship exited Pearl Harbor once again to support an amphibious assault – Operation Flintlock, the Marshall Islands invasion. The Fast Carrier Task Force was then attached to Fifth Fleet and re-designated TF 58, with the Yorktown task group re-designated as Task Group 58.1 (TG 58.1). When TG 58.1 arrived at its launching point early on the morning of 29 January, carriers Yorktown, Lexington, and Cowpens began sending air strikes aloft at about 05:20 for attacks on Taroa airfield located on Maloelap Atoll. Throughout the day, her aircraft hit Maloelap in preparation for the assaults on Majuro and Kwajalein scheduled for 31 January. On 30 January, Yorktown and her sister carriers shifted targets to Kwajalein to begin softening up one of the targets. When the troops stormed ashore on 31 January, Yorktown aviators continued their strikes on Kwajalein in support of the troops attacking that atoll. The same employment occupied the Yorktown air group during the first three days in February. On 4 February, however, the task group retired to the fleet anchorage at recently secured Majuro Atoll.

==== Central Pacific raids ====
Over the next four months, Yorktown participated in a series of raids in which she ranged from the Marianas in the north to New Guinea in the south. After eight days at Majuro, she sortied with her task group on 12 February to conduct air strikes on the main Japanese anchorage at Truk Atoll. Those highly successful raids occurred on 16–17 February. On 18 February, the carrier set a course for the Marianas, and on 22 February, conducted a single day of raids on enemy airfields and installations on Saipan. That same day, she cleared the area on her way back to Majuro. The warship arrived in Majuro lagoon on 26 February and remained there. On 8 March, the carrier stood out of Majuro, rendezvoused with the rest of TF 58, and shaped a course for Espiritu Santo in the New Hebrides. She reached her destination on 13 March and remained there for 10 days before getting underway for another series of raids on the Japanese middle defense line. On 30–31 March, she launched air strikes on Japanese installations located in the Palau Islands; and on 1 April, her aviators went after the island of Woleai. Five days later, she returned to her base at Majuro for a week of replenishment and recreation.

On 13 April, Yorktown returned to sea once more. On this occasion however, she laid in a course for the northern coast of New Guinea. On 21 April, she began launching raids in support of General Douglas MacArthur's assault on the Hollandia (currently known as Jayapura) area. That day, her aviators attacked installations in the Wakde-Sarmi area of northern New Guinea. On 22–23 April, they shifted to the landing areas at Hollandia themselves and began providing direct support for the assault troops. After those attacks, she retired from the New Guinea coast for another raid on Truk lagoon, which her aircraft carried out on 29 and 30 April. The aircraft carrier returned to Majuro on 4 May; however, two days later she got underway again, bound for Oahu. The warship entered Pearl Harbor on 11 May, and for the next 18 days, conducted training operations in the Hawaiian Islands. On 29 May, she headed back to the Central Pacific. Yorktown entered Majuro lagoon again on 3 June and began preparations for her next major amphibious support operation—the assault on the Marianas.

==== Marianas and Palau Islands ====
On 6 June, the aircraft carrier stood out of Majuro with TF 58 and set a course for the Mariana Islands. After five days steaming, she reached the launch point and began sending planes aloft for the preliminary softening up of targets in preparation for the invasion of Saipan. Yorktown aircrews concentrated primarily upon airfields located on Guam. Those raids continued until 13 June, when Yorktown, with two of the task groups of TF 58, steamed north to hit targets in the Bonin Islands. That movement resulted in a one-day raid on 16 June before the two task groups headed back to the Marianas to join in the Battle of the Philippine Sea. TF 58 reunited on 18 June and began a short wait for the approaching Japanese Fleet and its aircraft.

On the morning of 19 June, Yorktown aircraft began strikes on Japanese air bases on Guam in order to deny them to their approaching carrier-based air and to keep the land-based planes out of the fray. Duels with Guam-based aircraft continued until mid-morning. At about 10:17, however, she got her first indication of the carrier plane attacks when a large bogey appeared on her radar screen. At that point she divided her attention, sending part of her air group back to Guam and another portion of it out to meet the raid closing from the west. Throughout the battle, Yorktown's planes continued to strike the Guam airfields and intercept the carrier raids. During the first day of the Battle of the Philippine Sea, Yorktown aircraft claimed 37 enemy planes destroyed and dropped 21 tons of bombs on the Guam air bases.

On the morning of 20 June, Yorktown steamed generally west with TF 58 while search planes groped for the fleeing enemy task force. Contact was made with the enemy at about 15:40 when a pilot from Hornet spotted the retiring Combined Fleet units. Yorktown launched a 40-plane strike between 16:23 and 16:43. Her planes found Admiral Jisaburō Ozawa's force at about 18:40 and began a 20-minute attack during which they went after Zuikaku on which they succeeded in scoring some hits. They, however, failed to sink that carrier. They also attacked several other ships in the Japanese force, though no records show a confirmed sinking to the credit of the Yorktown air group. On 21 June, the carrier joined in the futile stern chase on the enemy carried out by TF 58 but gave up that evening when air searches failed to contact the Japanese. Yorktown returned to the Marianas area and resumed air strikes on Pagan Island on 22–23 June. On 24 June, she launched a series of raids on Iwo Jima. On 25 June, she laid in a course for Eniwetok and arrived there two days later. On 30 June, the aircraft carrier headed back to the Marianas and the Bonins. She renewed combat operations on 3–4 July with a series of attacks on Iwo Jima and Chichi Jima. On 6 July, the warship resumed strikes in the Marianas and continued them for the next 17 days. On 23 July, she headed off to the west for a series of raids on Yap, Ulithi, and the Palaus. She carried out those attacks on 25 July and arrived back in the Marianas on 29 July.

On 31 July, she cleared the Mariana Islands and headed—via Eniwetok and Pearl Harbor—back to the United States. Yorktown arrived in the Puget Sound Navy Yard on 17 August and began a two-month overhaul. She completed repairs on 6 October and departed Puget Sound on 9 October. She stopped at the Alameda Naval Air Station from 11 to 13 October to load planes and supplies and then set a course back to the western Pacific. After a stop at Pearl Harbor from 18 to 24 October, Yorktown arrived back in Eniwetok on 31 October. She departed the lagoon on 1 November and arrived at Ulithi on 3 November. There, she reported for duty with TG 38.4. The task group left Ulithi on 6 November.

==== Philippines campaign ====
On 7 November, the aircraft carrier changed operational control to TG 38.1 and, for the next two weeks, launched air strikes on targets in the Philippines in support of the Leyte invasion. Detached from the task force on 23 November, Yorktown arrived back in Ulithi on 24 November. She remained there until 10 December, at which time she put to sea to rejoin TF 38. She rendezvoused with the other carriers on 13 December and began launching air strikes on targets on the island of Luzon in preparation for the invasion of that island scheduled for the second week in January. On 17 December, the task force began its retirement from the Luzon strikes. During that retirement, TF 38 steamed through the center of the famous typhoon of December 1944. That storm sank three destroyers – Spence, Hull, and Monaghan – and Yorktown participated in some of the rescue operations for the survivors of those three destroyers. The warship arrived back in Ulithi on 24 December.

Yorktown fueled and provisioned at Ulithi until 30 December 1944, at which time she returned to sea to join TF 38 on strikes at targets in Formosa (now known as Taiwan) and the Philippines in support of the landings at Lingayen. The carriers began with raids on airfields on 3 January on the island of Formosa and continued with various targets for the next week. On 10 January, Yorktown and the rest of TF 38 entered the South China Sea via Bashi Channel to begin a series of raids on Japan's inner defenses. On 12 January, her planes visited the vicinity of Saigon and Tourane (now named Da Nang), Indochina, in hopes of catching major units of the Japanese fleet. Though foiled in their primary desire, TF 38 aviators still managed to rack up an exceptional score – 44 enemy ships, of which 15 were combatants. On 15 January, raids were launched on Formosa and Canton in China. The following day, her aviators struck at Canton again and also went to Hong Kong. On 20 January, she exited the South China Sea with TF 38 via Balintang Channel. She participated in a raid on Formosa on 21 January and another on Okinawa on 22 January before clearing the area for Ulithi. On the morning of 26 January, she re-entered Ulithi lagoon with TF 38.

==== Operations against Japan and Iwo Jima ====
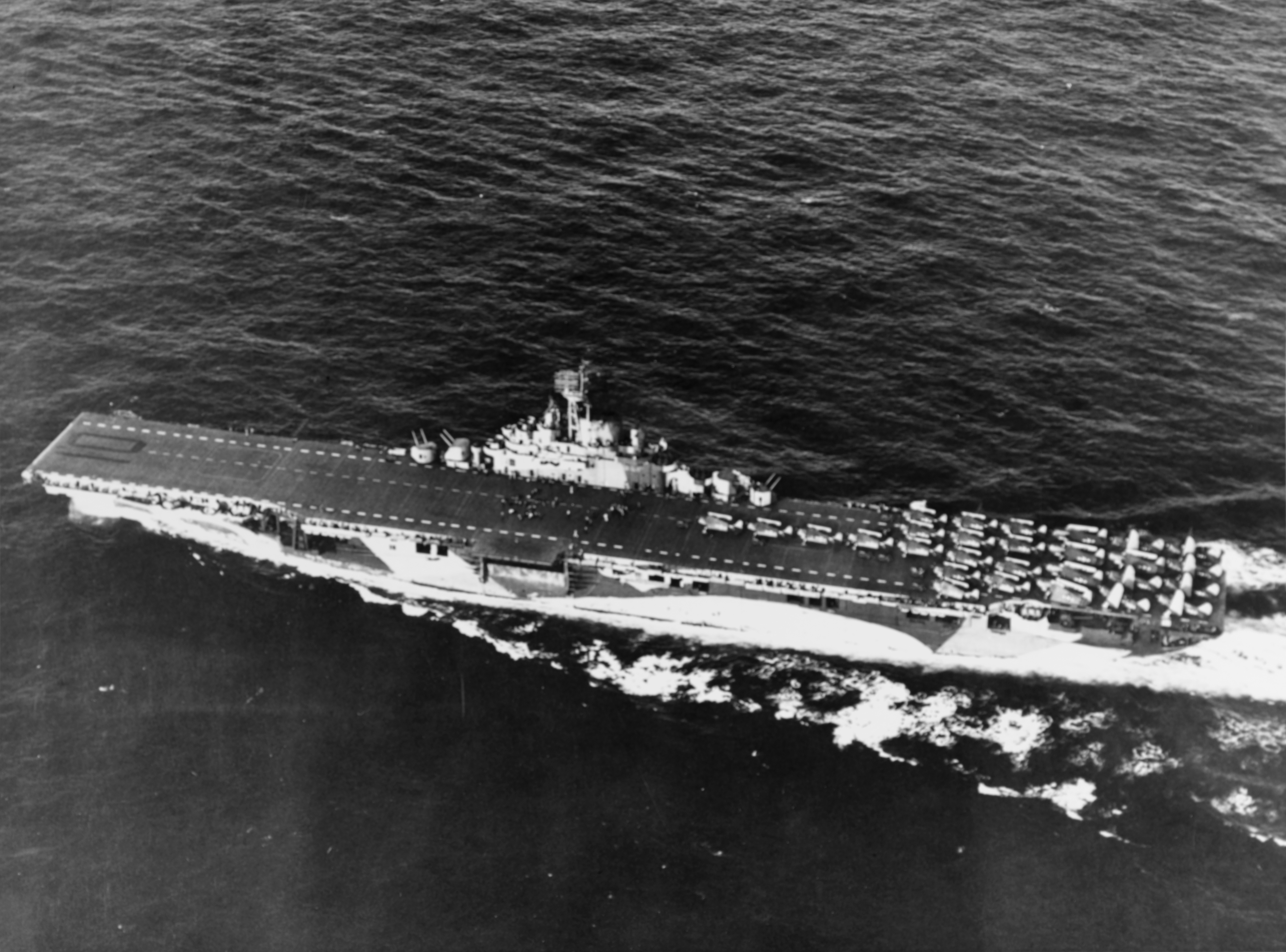
Yorktown with planes of Carrier Air Group 1

Yorktown remained at Ulithi arming, provisioning, and conducting upkeep until 10 February. At that time, she sortied with TF 58, the 3rd Fleet becoming the 5th Fleet when Raymond A. Spruance relieved William Halsey, Jr., on a series of raids on the Japanese and thence to support the assault on and occupation of Iwo Jima. On the morning of 16 February, the carrier began launching strikes on the Tokyo area of Honshū. On 17 February, she repeated those strikes before heading toward the Bonins. Her aviators bombed and strafed installations on Chichi Jima on 18 February. The landings on Iwo Jima went forward on 19 February, and Yorktown aircraft began support missions over the island on 20 February. Those missions continued until 23 February at which time Yorktown cleared the Bonins to resume strikes on Japan proper. She arrived at the launch point on 25 February and sent two raids aloft to bomb and strafe airfields in the vicinity of Tokyo. On 26 February, Yorktown aircrewmen conducted a single sweep of installations on Kyūshū before TG 58.4 began its retirement to Ulithi. Yorktown re-entered the anchorage at Ulithi on 1 March.

She remained in the anchorage for about two weeks. On 14 March, the carrier departed the lagoon on her way to resume raids on Japan and to begin preliminary support work for the Okinawa operations scheduled for 1 April. On 18 March, she arrived in the operating area off Japan and began launching strikes on airfields on Kyūshū, Honshū, and Shikoku.

The task group came under air attack almost as soon as operations began. At about 08:00, a twin-engine bomber, probably a Yokosuka P1Y "Frances", attacked from her port side. The ship opened fire almost immediately and began scoring hits quickly. The plane began to burn but continued his run passing over Yorktown's bow and splashing in the water on her starboard side. Just seven minutes later, another Frances tried but also went down, a victim of the combined fire of the formation. No further attacks developed until that afternoon; and, in the meantime, Yorktown continued air operations. That afternoon, three Yokosuka D4Y "Judy" dive-bombers launched attacks on the carrier. The first two were shot down, but the third succeeded in planting his bomb on the signal bridge. It passed through the first deck and exploded near the ship's hull. It punched two large holes through her side, killed five men, and wounded another 26. Yorktown, however, remained fully operational, and her anti-aircraft gunners brought the attacker down. She continued air operations against the three southernmost islands of Japan and retired for fueling operations on 20 March.

On 21 March, she headed for Okinawa, on which she began softening-up strikes on 23 March. Those attacks continued until 28 March when she started back to Japanese waters for an additional strike on the home islands. On 29 March, the carrier put two raids and one photographic reconnaissance mission into the air over Kyūshū. That afternoon, at about 14:10, a single "Judy" made an apparent suicide dive on Yorktown. The anti-aircraft guns scored numerous hits. The plane passed over the ship and crashed about 60 ft (18 m) from her portside.

==== Battle of Okinawa ====
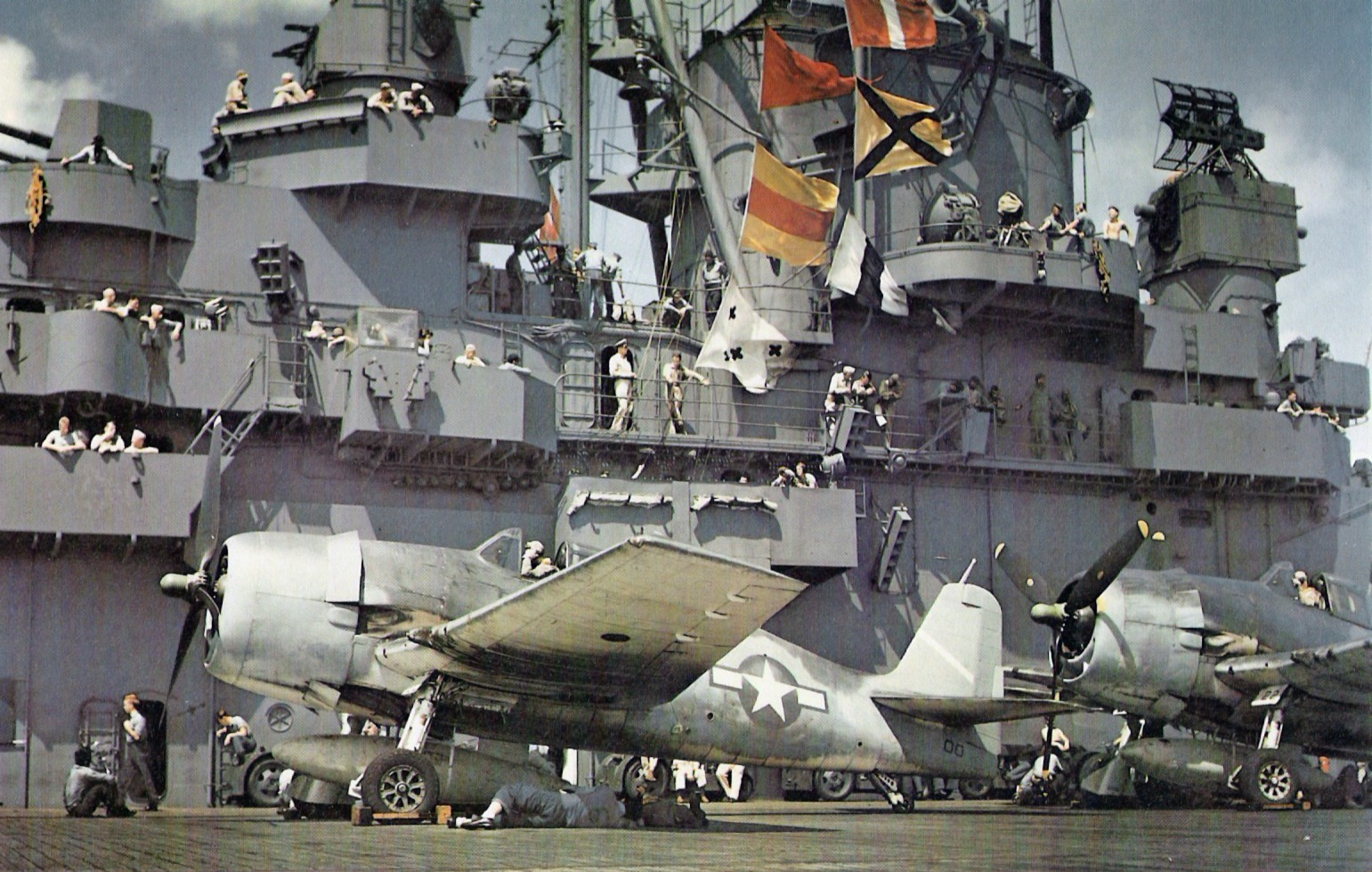
Yorktown during the air operations in the Pacific

On 30 March, Yorktown and the other carriers of her task group began to concentrate solely on the island of Okinawa and its surrounding islets. For two days, they pounded the island in softening-up strikes. On 1 April, the assault troops stormed ashore; and, for almost six weeks, she sent her planes to the island to provide direct support for the troops operating ashore. About every three days, she retired to the east to conduct fueling rendezvous or to rearm and re-provision. The only exception to that routine came on 7 April when it was discovered that a Japanese task force built around the elusive battleship Yamato was steaming south for one last, desperate, offensive. Yorktown and the other carriers quickly launched strikes to attack that valued target. Air Group 9 aviators claimed several torpedo hits on Yamato just before the battleship exploded and sank. At least three 500 lb (230 kg) bomb hits on the light cruiser Yahagi sank her also. The pilots also made strafing runs on the escorting destroyers and claimed to have left one afire in a sinking condition. At the conclusion of that action, Yorktown and her planes resumed their support for the troops on Okinawa. On 11 April, she came under air attack again when a single-engine plane sped in on her. Yorktown's anti-aircraft gunners brought down the plane. Sporadic air attacks continued until her 11 May departure from the Ryūkyūs, but Yorktown sustained no additional damage and claimed only one further kill with her anti-aircraft battery. On 11 May, TG 58.4 was detached to proceed to Ulithi for upkeep, rest, and relaxation.

Yorktown entered the lagoon at Ulithi on 14 May and remained there until 24 May at which time she sortied with TG 58.4 to rejoin the forces off Okinawa. On 28 May, TG 58.4 became TG 38.4 when Halsey relieved Spruance and 5th Fleet again became 3rd Fleet. That same day, the carrier resumed air support missions over Okinawa. That routine lasted until the beginning of June when she moved off with TF 38 to resume strikes on the Japanese homeland. On 3 June, her aircraft made four different sweeps of airfields. The following day, she returned to Okinawa for a day of additional support missions before steaming off to evade a typhoon. On 6–7 June, she resumed Okinawa strikes. She sent her aviators back to the Kyūshū airfields and, on 9 June, launched them on the first of two days of raids on Minami Daito Shima. After the second day's strikes, Yorktown began retirement with TG 38.4 toward Leyte. She arrived in San Pedro Bay at Leyte on 13 June and began replenishment, upkeep, rest, and relaxation.

==== End of the war ====
The warship remained at Leyte until 1 July when she and TG 38.4 got underway to join the rest of the fast carriers in the final series of raids on the Japanese home islands. By 10 July, she was off the coast of Japan launching air strikes on the Tokyo area of Honshū. After a fueling rendezvous on 11–12 July, she resumed strikes on Japan, this on the southern portion of the northernmost island Hokkaidō. Those strikes lasted from 13 to 15 July. A fueling retirement and heavy weather precluded air operations until 18 July, at which time her aviators attacked the Japanese naval base at Yokosuka. From 19 to 22 July, she made a fueling and underway replenishment retirement and then, on 24 July, resumed air attacks on Japan. For two days, planes of her air group pounded installations around the Kure naval base. Another fueling retirement came on 26 July, and on 27–28 July, her planes were in the air above Kure again. On 29–30 July, she shifted targets back to the Tokyo area before another fueling retirement and another typhoon took her out of action until the beginning of the first week in August. On 8–9 August, the carrier launched her planes at northern Honshū and southern Hokkaido. On 10 August, she sent them back to Tokyo. On 11 and 12 August, another fueling retirement and a typhoon evasion was scheduled. On 13 August, her aircraft hit Tokyo for the last time. On 14 August, she retired to fuel destroyers again; and on 15 August, Japan agreed to capitulate so that all strikes planned for that day were canceled.

From 16 to 23 August, Yorktown and the other carriers of TF 58 steamed around the waters to the east of Japan awaiting instructions while peace negotiations continued. She then received orders to head for waters east of Honshū where her aircraft were to provide cover for the forces occupying Japan. She began providing that air cover on 25 August and continued to do so until mid-September. After the formal surrender aboard battleship Missouri on 2 September, the aircraft carrier also began air-dropping supplies to Allied prisoners of war still living in their prison camps. On 16 September, Yorktown entered Tokyo Bay with TG 38.1. She remained there, engaged in upkeep and crew recreation through the end of the month. On 1 October, the carrier stood out of Tokyo Bay on her way to Okinawa. She arrived in Buckner Bay on 4 October, loaded passengers, and got underway for the United States on 6 October.

=== Post war ===
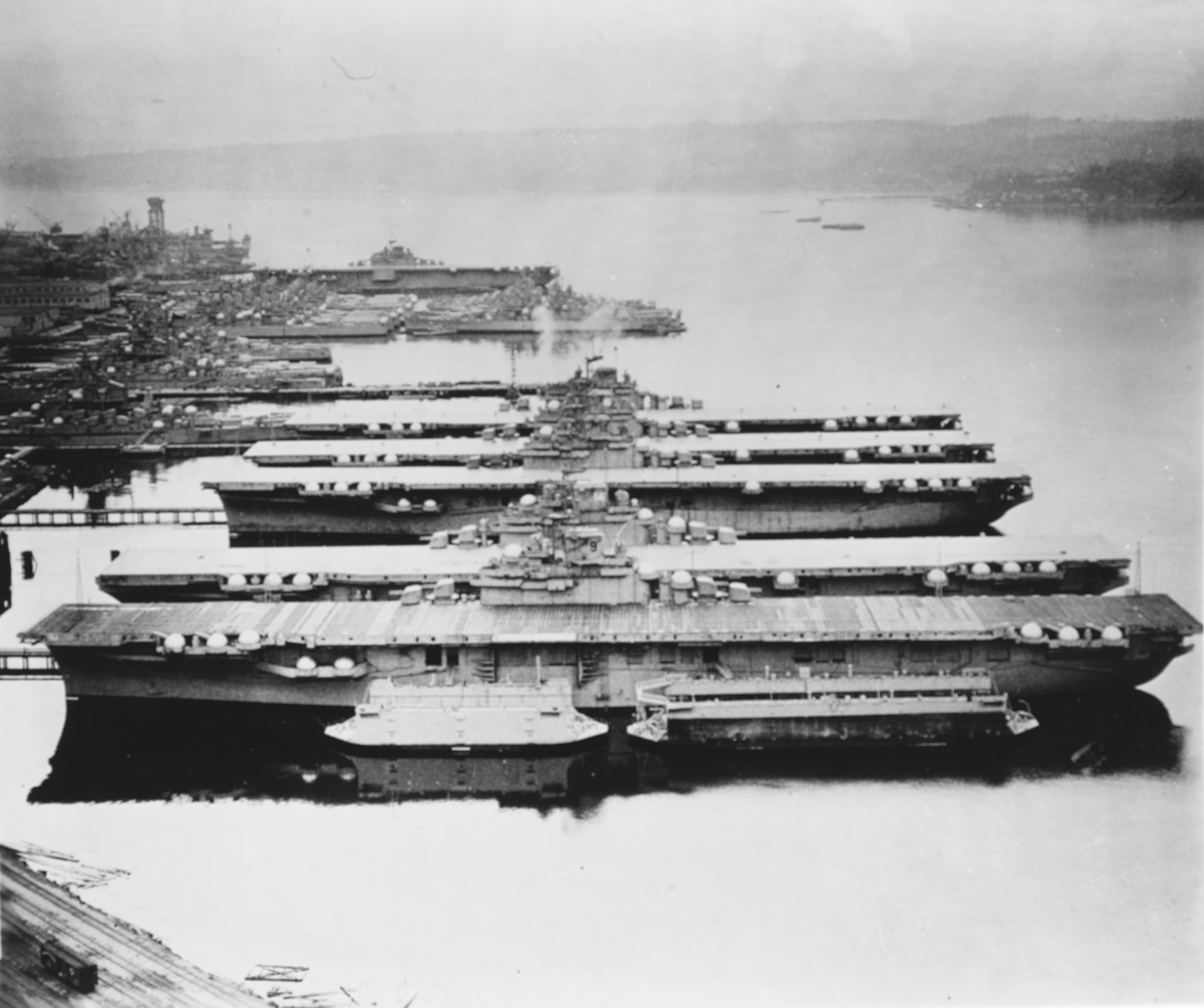
Mothballed Yorktown at Puget Sound Naval Shipyard in 1948. From front to rear Essex, Ticonderoga, Yorktown, Lexington, Bunker Hill, Bon Homme Richard

==== 1945–1955 ====
After a non-stop voyage, Yorktown entered San Francisco Bay on 20 October, moored at the Alameda Naval Air Station, and began discharging passengers. She remained at the air station until 31 October at which time she shifted to Hunters Point Navy Yard to complete minor repairs. On 2 November, while still at the navy yard, she reported to the Service Force, Pacific Fleet, for duty in conjunction with the return of American servicemen to the United States. That same day, she stood out of San Francisco Bay, bound for Guam on just such a mission. She arrived in Apra Harbor on 15 November and, two days later, got underway with a load of passengers. She arrived back in San Francisco on 30 November. On 8 December, the warship headed back to the Far East. Initially routed to Samar in the Philippines, she was diverted to Manila en route. She arrived in Manila on 26 December and departed there on 29 December. She reached San Francisco again on 13 January 1946. Later that month, she moved north to Bremerton, Washington, where she was placed in reserve while still in commission, on 21 June. She remained there in that status through the end of the year. On 9 January 1947, Yorktown was decommissioned and was berthed with the Bremerton Group, Pacific Reserve Fleet.

In June 1952, she was ordered reactivated, and work began on her at Puget Sound. On 15 December 1952, she was placed in commission, in reserve, at Bremerton. Her conversion continued into 1953 and she conducted post-conversion trials late in January. On 20 February 1953, Yorktown was placed in full commission as an attack carrier (CVA), with Captain William M. Nation in command. The aircraft carrier conducted normal operations along the west coast through most of the summer of 1953. On 3 August, she departed San Francisco on her way to the Far East. She arrived in Pearl Harbor and remained there until 27 August, at which time she continued her voyage west. On 5 September, the carrier arrived in Yokosuka, Japan. She put to sea again on 11 September to join TF 77 in the Sea of Japan. The Korean War armistice had been signed two months earlier; and, therefore, the carrier conducted training operations rather than combat missions. She served with TF 77 until 18 February 1954, at which time she stood out of Yokosuka on her way home. She made a stop at Pearl Harbor along the way and then moored at Alameda once more on 3 March.

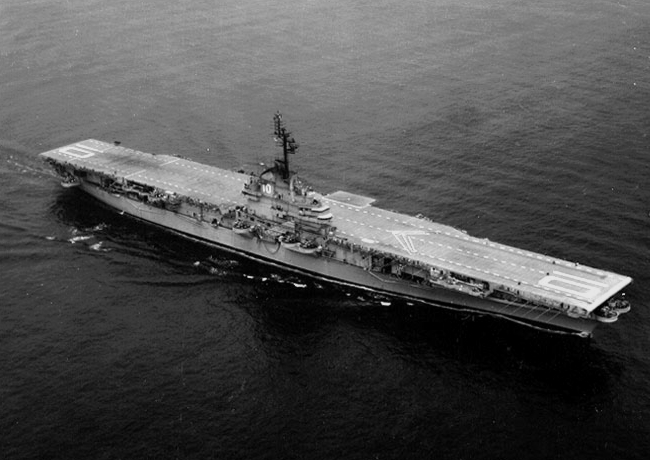
Yorktown after the SCB-27A conversion in 1953

After a brief repair period at Hunters Point Naval Shipyard, Yorktown put to sea to serve as a platform for the filming of the Academy Award-nominated short subject documentary film Jet Carrier. She conducted further, more routine, operations along the west coast until 1 July, at which time she headed back to the Orient. She stopped at Pearl Harbor from 8–28 July before continuing on to Manila, where she arrived on 4 August. Yorktown operated out of the Manila-Subic Bay area, conducting 7th Fleet maneuvers, for the duration of the deployment. She did, however, take periodic breaks from that schedule to make frequent port visits to Yokosuka; and, during the Christmas holidays, she made a liberty call at Hong Kong on the Chinese coast. In January 1955, she was called upon to help cover the evacuation of Nationalist Chinese from the Tachen Islands located near the communist-controlled mainland. Yorktown entered Yokosuka for the last time on 16 February 1955 but departed again on 18 February to return home. After an overnight stop at Pearl Harbor on 23–24 February, she resumed her voyage east and arrived in Alameda on 28 February.

==== 1955–1960 ====
On 21 March 1955, she was placed in reserve while still in commission at the Puget Sound Naval Shipyard where she was to receive extensive modifications—most significantly, an angled flight deck to increase her jet aircraft launching capability. She completed her conversion that fall, and on 14 October was placed back in full commission. The carrier resumed normal operations along the West Coast soon after recommissioning. That assignment lasted until mid-March 1956. On 19 March, she stood out of San Francisco Bay on her way to her third tour of duty with the 7th Fleet since her reactivation in 1953. Yorktown stopped at Pearl Harbor from 24 March to 9 April and then continued her voyage west. She arrived in Yokosuka, Japan, on 18 April and departed again on 29 April. The warship operated with the 7th Fleet for the next five months. During that time, she conducted operations in the Sea of Japan, the East China Sea, and the South China Sea. She also visited such places as Sasebo, Manila, Subic Bay, and Buckner Bay at Okinawa.

On 7 September, the aircraft carrier stood out of Yokosuka and pointed her bow to the east. After a non-stop voyage, she arrived back at Alameda on 13 September. She resumed west coast operations for about two months. On 13 November, she embarked upon a round-trip to Pearl Harbor, from which she returned to Alameda on 11 December. Yorktown resumed normal operations out of Alameda upon her return and remained so employed until March 1957. On 9 March, she departed Alameda for yet another tour of duty in the Far East. She made stops at Oahu and Guam along the way and arrived at Yokosuka on 19 April. She put to sea to join TF 77 on 25 April and served with that task force for the next three months. On 13 August, the warship departed Yokosuka for the last time, made a brief pause at Pearl Harbor, and arrived in Alameda on 25 August. On 1 September, her home port was changed from Alameda to Long Beach, California, and she was reclassified an antisubmarine warfare (ASW) aircraft carrier with the new designation CVS-10. On 23 September, she departed Alameda and, four days later, entered the Puget Sound Naval Shipyard for overhaul and for modification to an ASW carrier. That yard period lasted until the beginning of February 1958.

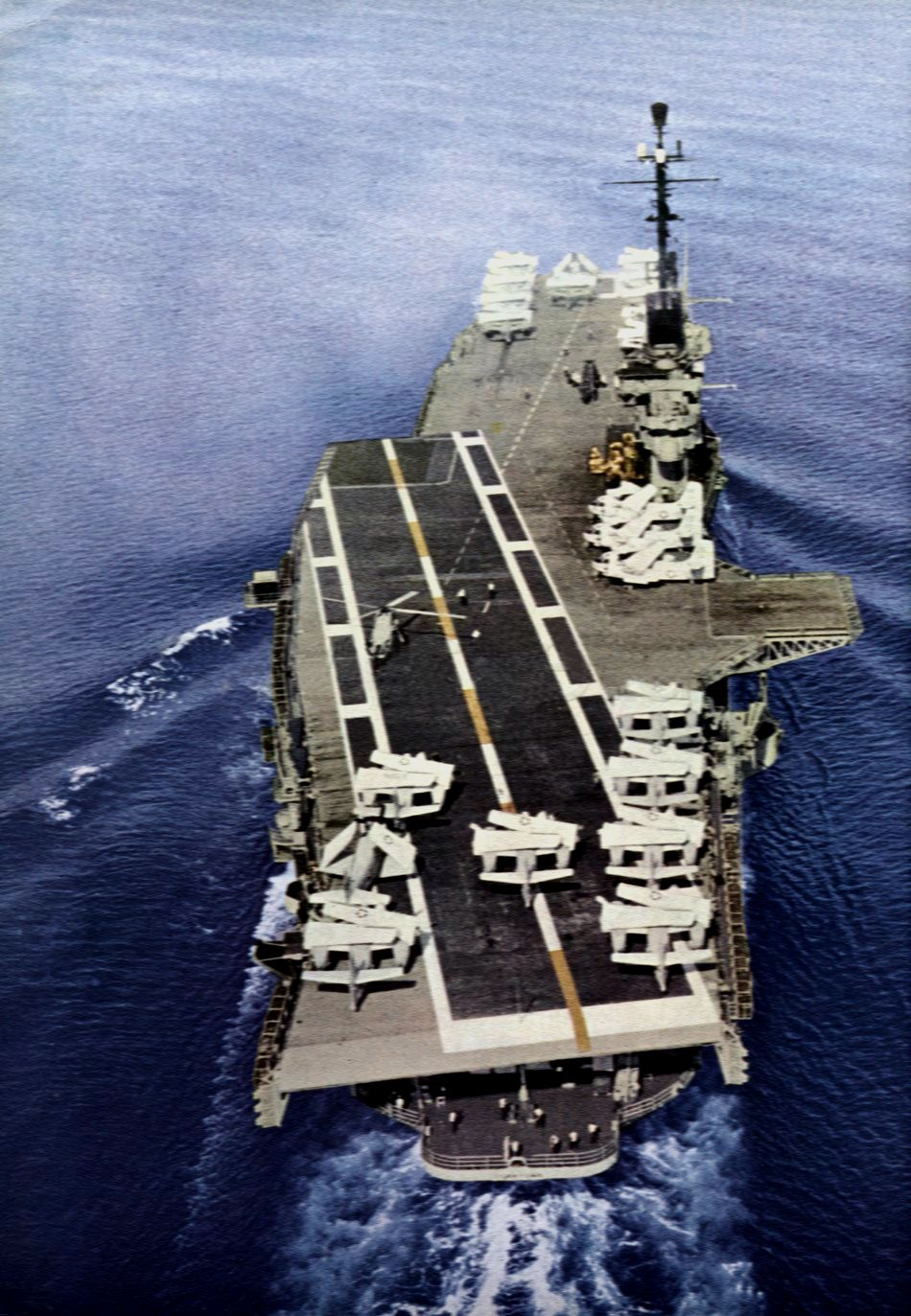
Yorktown's final flight deck configuration.

She departed the naval ammunition depot at Bangor, Washington, on 7 February and entered Long Beach five days later. For the next eight months, Yorktown conducted normal operations along the west coast. On 1 November, she departed San Diego to return to the western Pacific. After a stop at Pearl Harbor from 8–17 November, Yorktown continued her voyage west and arrived in Yokosuka on 25 November. During that deployment, the aircraft carrier qualified for the Armed Forces Expeditionary Medal on three occasions. The first time came on 31 December and 1 January 1959, when she participated in an American show of strength in response to the communist Chinese shelling of the offshore islands, Quemoy and Matsu, held by Nationalist Chinese forces.

During January, she also joined contingency forces off Vietnam during internal disorders caused by communist guerrillas in the southern portion of that country. That month she earned the expeditionary medal for service in the Taiwan Strait. The remainder of the deployment—save for another visit to Vietnamese waters late in March—consisted of a normal round of training evolutions and port visits. She concluded that tour of duty at San Diego on 21 May. The warship resumed normal operations along the west coast, and that duty consumed the remainder of 1959. In January 1960, Yorktown headed back to the Far East via Pearl Harbor. During that deployment, she earned additional stars for her Armed Forces Expeditionary Medal for duty in Vietnamese waters at various times in March, April, May, and June. She returned to the west coast late in the summer and, late in September, began a four-month overhaul at the Puget Sound Naval Shipyard.

==== 1961–1964 ====
Yorktown emerged from the shipyard in January 1961 and returned to Long Beach on 27 January. On 30 March 1961 The Tennessee Ernie Ford Show Season 5 Episode 26 was filmed aboard the Yorktown to commemorate 50 years of US Navy aviation. Tennessee's guests were Joe Flynn and the Command and Crew of The USS Yorktown. Then she conducted refresher training and then resumed normal west coast operations until late July. On 29 July, the aircraft carrier stood out of Long Beach, bound once again for western Pacific. She made an extended stopover in the Hawaiian Islands in August and, consequently, did not arrive in Yokosuka until 4 September. That tour of duty in the Far East consisted of a normal schedule of anti-air and antisubmarine warfare exercises as well as the usual round of port visits. She concluded the deployment at Long Beach on 2 March 1962. Normal west coast operations occupied her time through the summer and into the fall.

On 26 October 1962, the warship left Long Beach in her wake and set a course for Pearl Harbor, Hawaii, then on to Japan, Hong Kong, and the Philippines in the Far East. During that deployment, she served as flagship for Carrier Division 19. She participated in several ASW and AAW exercises, including the SEATO ASW exercise, Operation Sea Serpent. The deployment lasted until 6 June 1963, at which time the carrier set a course back to Long Beach. Yorktown arrived back in her home port on 18 June 1963 and resumed normal operations until the fall, then went into drydock at the Long Beach Naval Shipyard facility at Long Beach Ca. The Yorktown came out of yard in the spring of 1964. Those operations continued throughout most of 1964 as well. However, on 22 October, she pointed her bow westward again and set out for a tour of duty with the 7th Fleet. Another period of operations in the Hawaiian Islands delayed her arrival in Japan until 3 December.

==== 1965–1968 ====
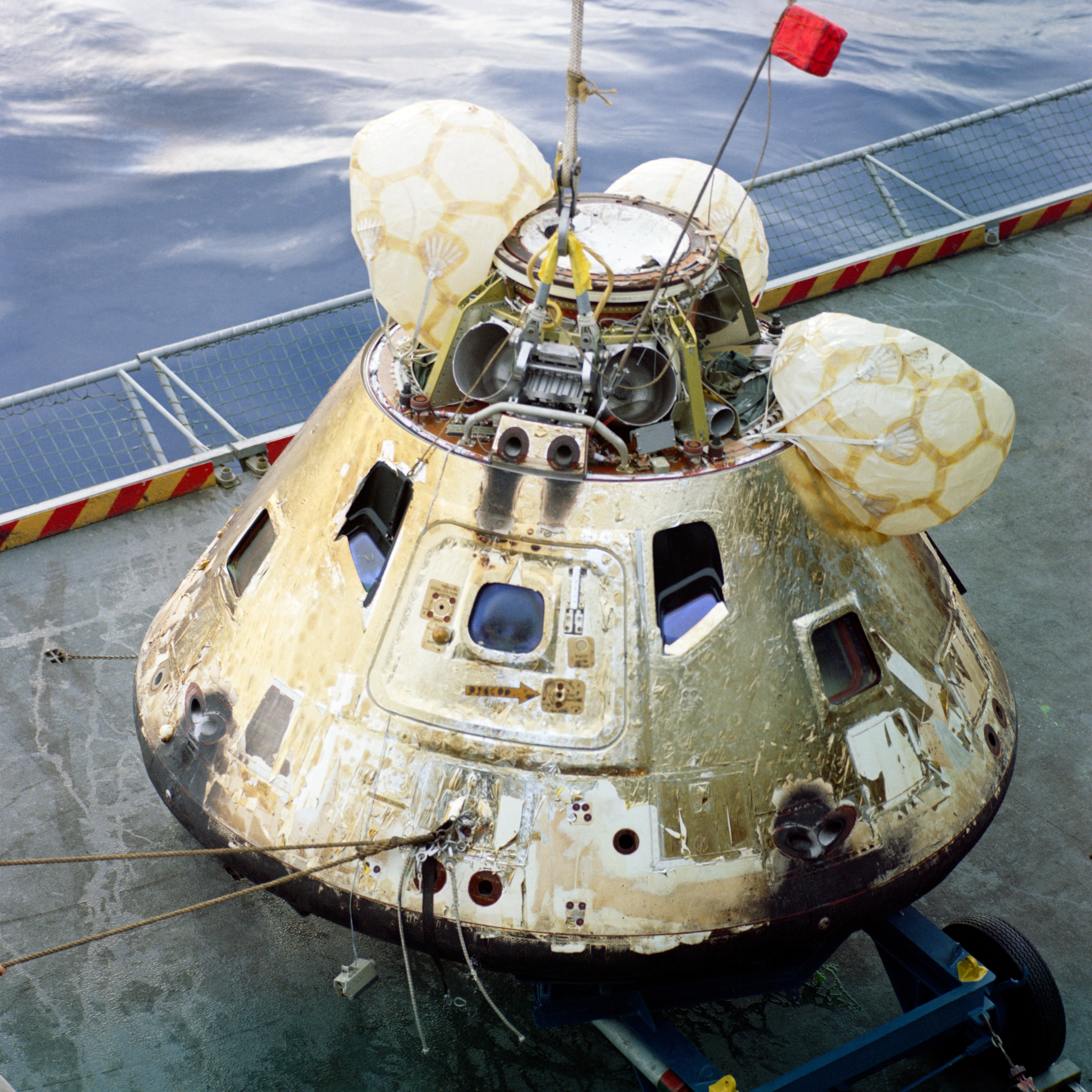
The Apollo 8 Command Module on Yorktown's deck

The 1964 and 1965 deployment brought Yorktown her first real involvement in the Vietnam War. In February, March, and April, she conducted a series of special operations in the South China Sea in waters near Vietnam; Anti-Submarine Warfare "ASW" services for the fast carriers conducting air strikes against targets in Vietnam in support of the increased American involvement in the civil war in that country. She concluded her tour of duty in the Far East on 7 May 1965, when she departed Yokosuka, Japan, to return to the United States. The carrier arrived in Long Beach on 17 May.

For the remainder of her active career, Yorktown's involvement in combat operations in Vietnam proved a dominant feature of her activities. After seven months of normal operations out of Long Beach, she got underway for the western Pacific again on 5 January 1966. She arrived in Yokosuka, Japan, on 17 February and joined TF 77 on Yankee Station later that month. Over the next five months, the aircraft carrier spent three extended tours of duty on Yankee Station providing Anti-Submarine Warfare "ASW" and sea-air rescue services for the carriers of TF 77. She also participated in several "ASW" exercises, including the major SEATO exercise, Operation Sea Imp. The warship concluded her last tour of duty on Yankee Station early in July and, after a stop at Yokosuka, Japan, headed home on 15 July. She debarked her air group at San Diego on 27 July and reentered Long Beach that same day. She resumed normal operations – carrier qualifications and "ASW" exercises – for the remainder of the year and during the first two months of 1967.

On 24 February 1967, Yorktown entered the Long Beach Naval Shipyard for a seven-month overhaul. She completed repairs early in October and, after refresher training, resumed normal west coast operations for most of what remained of 1967. On 28 December, she stood out of Long Beach, bound for her last tour of duty in the western Pacific. After a stop at Pearl Harbor, she arrived in the Far East late in January 1968. Instead of putting in at a Japanese port for turnover Yorktown headed directly to the Sea of Japan to provide "ASW" and search and rescue "SAR" support for Task Force 71, the contingency force assembled in the wake of the North Korean capture of Pueblo. She remained on that 'Operation Formation Star' assignment for 30 days. On 1 March, she was released for other duties, and headed for Subic Bay in the Philippines. During the remainder of the deployment, Yorktown did another three tours of duty with TF 77 on Yankee Station. In each instance, she provided "ASW" and "SAR" support for the fast carriers launching air strikes on targets in Vietnam. She concluded her last tour of duty in Vietnamese waters on 16 June and set a course for Sasebo, Japan, where she stopped from 19 to 21 June before heading back to the United States.

==== 1968–1975 ====
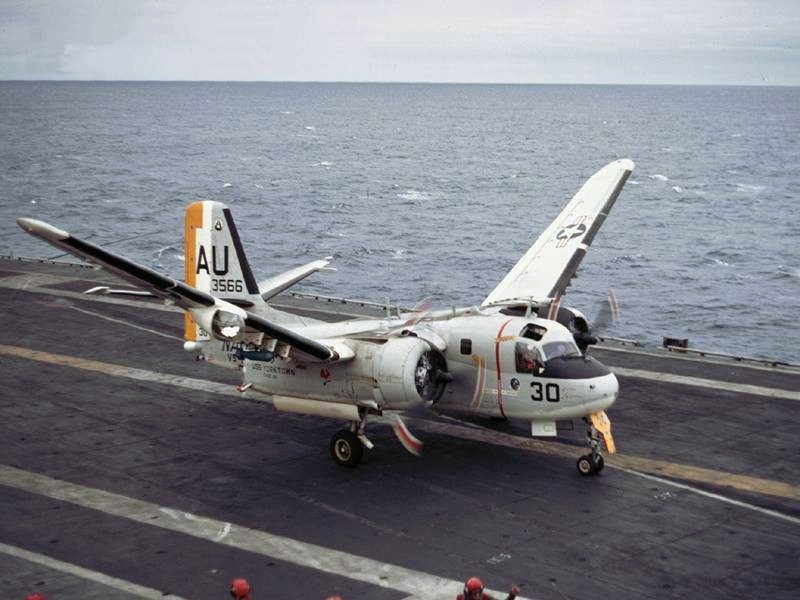
An S-2E Tracker of VS-27 taxies away with wings folding, just after having caught the wire aboard Yorktown during her 1969 Atlantic deployment

Yorktown arrived back in Long Beach on 5 July and entered the Long Beach Naval Shipyard that same day for almost three months of repairs. She completed repairs on 30 September and resumed normal operations. Late in November and early in December, she served as a platform for the filming of another movie, Tora! Tora! Tora! which recreated the Japanese attack on Pearl Harbor. In December 1968, she served as the prime recovery ship for the Apollo 8 space mission. The two missions mentioned above were conducted out of Pearl Harbor. She departed Pearl Harbor on 2 January 1969, and after a two-week stop in Long Beach, continued her voyage to join the U.S. Atlantic Fleet. Steaming around South America, the aircraft carrier arrived in her new home port—Norfolk, Virginia—on 28 February. She conducted operations along the east coast and in the West Indies until late summer. On 2 September, Yorktown departed Norfolk for a northern European cruise and participation in the major fleet exercise Operation Peacekeeper. During the exercise, she provided ASW and SAR support for the task force. The exercise ended on 23 September, and Yorktown began a series of visits to northern European ports. After a visit each to Brest, France, and Rotterdam in the Netherlands, Yorktown put to sea for a series of hunter/killer ASW exercises from 18 October – 11 November. She resumed her itinerary of port visits on 11 November at Kiel, Germany. After that, she stopped at Copenhagen, Denmark, and at Portsmouth, England, before getting underway for home on 1 December. She reentered Norfolk on 11 December and began her holiday leave period.

During the first half of 1970, Yorktown operated out of Norfolk and began preparations for inactivation. On 27 June 1970, Yorktown was decommissioned at Philadelphia, Pennsylvania, and was berthed with the Philadelphia Group, Atlantic Reserve Fleet. She remained there almost three years before her name was struck from the Navy List on 1 June 1973. During 1974, the Navy Department approved the donation of Yorktown to the Patriot's Point Development Authority, Charleston, South Carolina. She was towed from Bayonne, New Jersey, to Charleston in June 1975, and formally dedicated as a memorial on the 200th anniversary of the Navy, 13 October 1975.

==== 1975–present ====
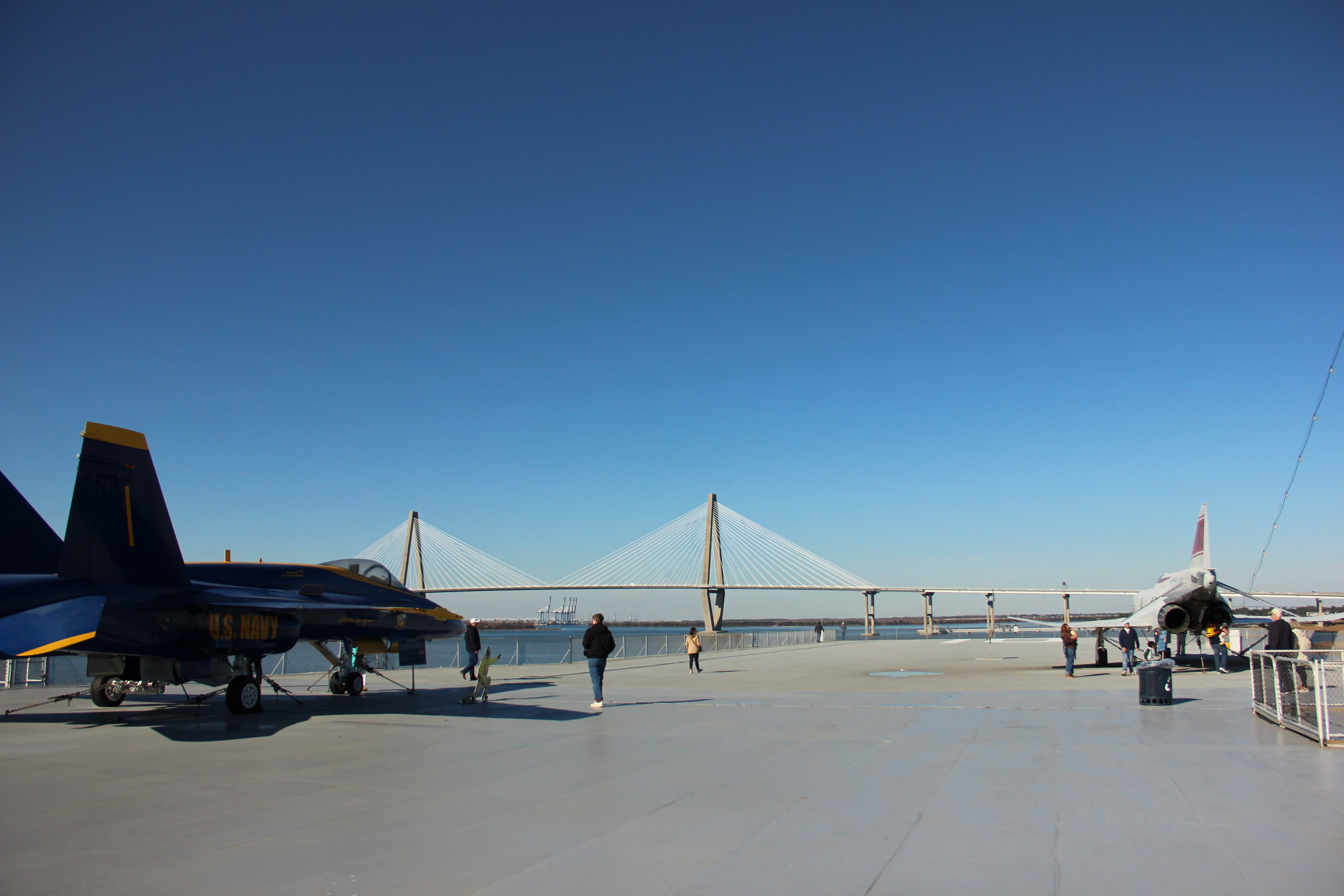
View atop USS Yorktown in 2025

On January 3, 1976 Patriots Point museum opened, which features Yorktown as its centerpiece. The ship has been open to the civilian public as a Museum ship since and the ship was the first Aircraft carrier to be converted into a museum ship.

Yorktown was declared a National Historic Landmark in 1986.

Through most of the 1990s, Yorktown housed WSCI-FM, 89.3, a local public radio station, part of the South Carolina Educational Radio Network. WSCI's offices and library were inside, while its broadcast booth was in the ship's "pri-fly", primary flight control, the control tower of an aircraft carrier, overlooking the water facing the Charleston peninsula. South Carolina Educational Radio shut down WSCI's local broadcasting in 1998.

Patriots Point has continued to grow serving as an embarkation point for Fort Sumter tour boats, home to several other vessels (including the Allen M. Sumner-class, Laffey, "the ship that would not die";) as well as the Cold War Submarine Memorial, a replica of a Vietnam Support Base, and the museum of the Medal of Honor Society, which is located on Yorktown's hangar deck. On 2 September 2003, Yorktown served as the backdrop for the formal announcement of Senator John Kerry's candidacy as he sought, and ultimately won, the Democratic nomination for President of the United States for the 2004 election.

On 9 November 2012, Marquette University was scheduled to face Ohio State University on Yorktown's deck in the second annual Carrier Classic college basketball game. Over 8,000 veterans and active duty military men and women attended the game. However, the makeshift courts became too wet with condensation, delaying tip-off. The game was eventually canceled.

In 2015, Collins Engineers, Inc. estimated that $40 million worth of repairs to the ship's hull will be required in the near future. The first phase of the project was to remove old fuel from the oil tanks. Approximately 60,000 gallons has been removed as of late 2015. By 2025, 1.6 million gallons of waste had been removed.

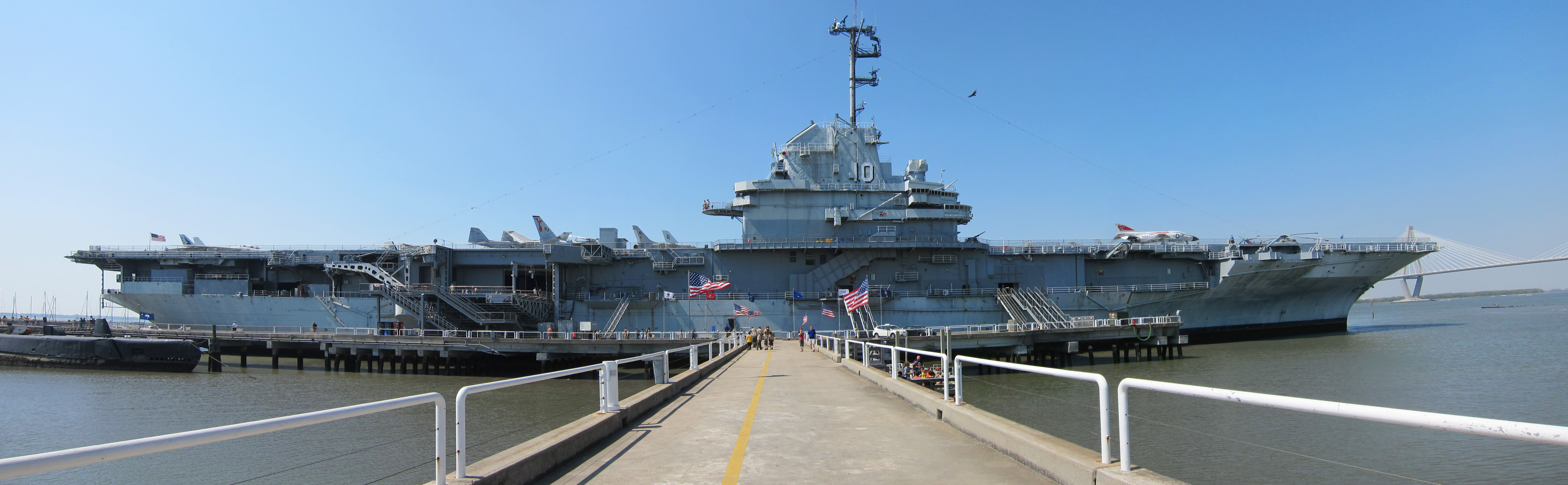
Panoramic image of Yorktown at Patriots Point

== Awards ==
Yorktown earned 12 battle stars and the Presidential Unit Citation during World War II and five battle stars for Vietnam service.

Presidential Unit Citation | Meritorious Unit Commendation
China Service Medal	American; Campaign Medal	Asiatic-Pacific; Campaign Medal with 11 stars
World War II; Victory Medal	Navy Occupation; Service Medal with "Asia" clasp	National Defense; Service Medal with 1 star
Korean Service Medal	Armed Forces; Expeditionary Medal with 3 stars	Vietnam Service Medal with 4 stars
Philippine Presidential; Unit Citation	Republic of Vietnam; Meritorious Unit Citation (Gallantry Cross)	Philippine; Liberation Medal
United Nations; Korean Medal	Republic of Korea; War Service Medal	Republic of Vietnam; Campaign Medal
