= Patriots Point =

Patriots Point Naval & Maritime Museum
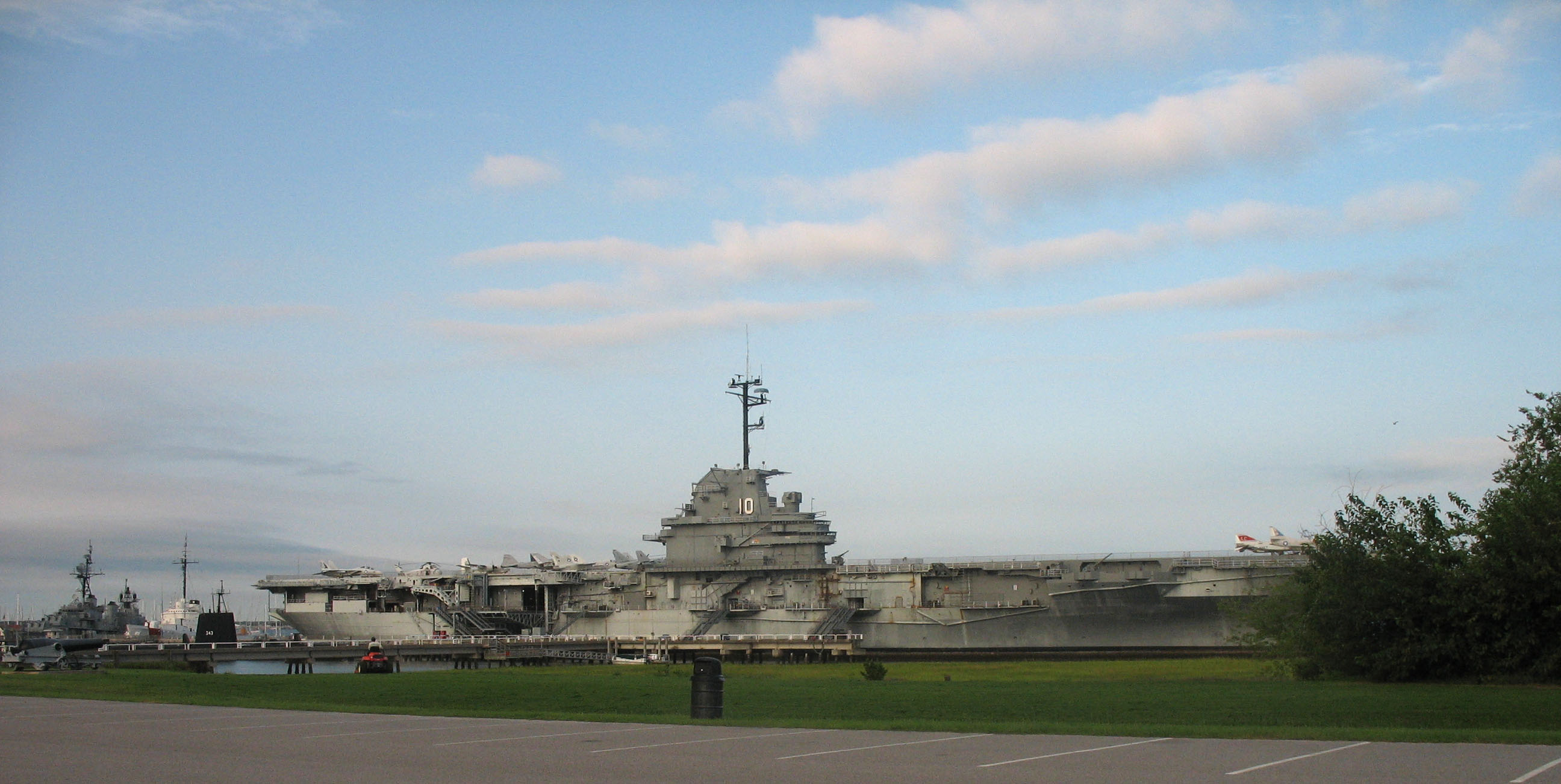

- Location within South Carolina
- Established: 3 January 1976
- Location: 40 Patriots Point Road, Mount Pleasant, South Carolina, USA
- Coordinates: 32.790377°N 79.90821°W
- Type: Naval museum
- Website: www.patriotspoint.org

Patriots Point Naval & Maritime Museum is a naval museum located in Mount Pleasant, South Carolina, at the mouth of the Cooper River on the Charleston Harbor, across from Charleston.

The museum attracts more than 300,000 visitors each year with its 1,000,000 square feet of living exhibits and artifacts, landside and on ship.

== History ==
The museum was born out of an idea by former naval officer Charles F. Hyatt to develop a major tourist attraction on what had once been a dump for dredged mud. Initial plans for the museum called for a large building onshore to display exhibits related to the history of small combatant ships in the U.S. Navy. On 3 January 1976, the aircraft carrier USS Yorktown was opened to the public.

The destroyer USS Laffey was added to the museum in 1978. The museum was expanded again in 1981 with the addition of the submarine USS Clamagore in May and NS Savannah in October. USCGC Comanche was acquired in 1984.

The Patriots Point Development Authority attempted to capitalize on its financial success in 1987 when it announced an plans to build a hotel and marina. However, the museum encountered controversy in 1989 when it was revealed that Comanche, which never opened to the public, had been used to conduct cruises for private tours and VIP parties. The same year, USCGC Ingham arrived at the museum, replacing Comanche. The latter was removed from the museum and sunk as a reef in 1992, but not before suffering damage during Hurricane Hugo. By that time, the development project had failed, and the development authority was forced to declare bankruptcy.

A replica of a Vietnam War-era naval base was opened in 1993. Savannah was removed from the museum and towed to the James River Merchant Marine Reserve Fleet in 1994. On 2 September 2003, Yorktown served as the backdrop for the formal announcement of Senator John Kerry's candidacy as he sought, and ultimately won, the Democratic nomination for President of the United States for the 2004 election.

Laffey was towed to a shipyard for repairs on 19 August 2009. The following day, Ingham was removed by the Coast Guard. The destroyer returned to the museum in 2012. Clamagore was towed away for scrapping in 2022 due to structural issues that were too expensive to repair.

In 2025, 568,000 US gallons (2,150,000 L) of contaminated liquid and 13.38 short tons (12,140 kg) of asbestos and sludge were removed from Yorktown. In addition, 35 structural repairs were completed on the ship.

== Exhibits ==
=== Ships ===
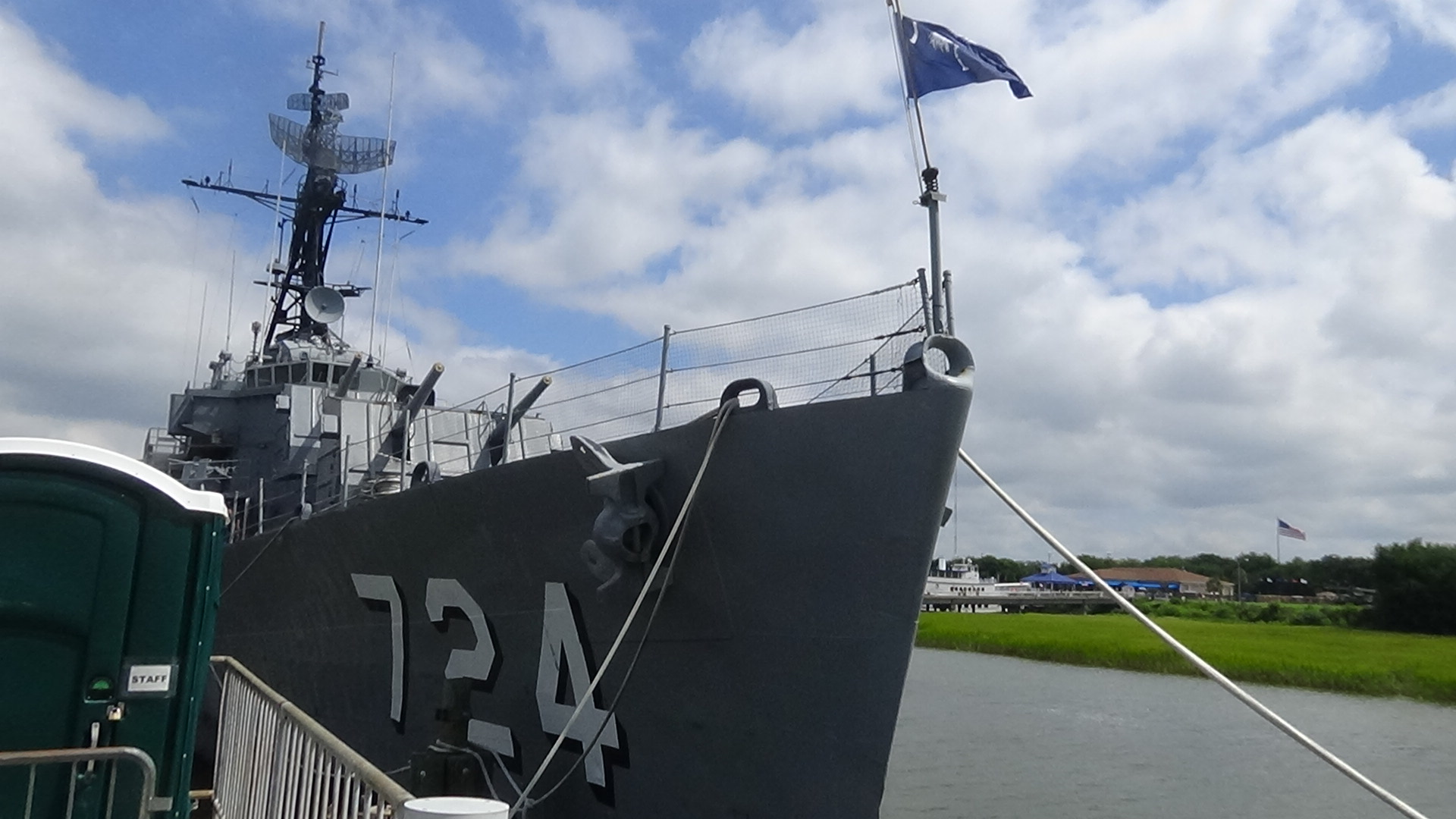
USS Laffey

- USS Yorktown, an aircraft carrier

The centerpiece of the museum’s fleet is the USS Yorktown (CV-10), an Essex-class aircraft carrier that earned an extensive combat record during World War II. Commissioned in 1943, Yorktown participated in major Pacific Theater operations, including campaigns in the Marshall Islands, the Marianas, the Philippines, and Okinawa, ultimately receiving numerous battle stars for her wartime service. The carrier later supported operations during the Vietnam War before being decommissioned in 1970.

In 1968, the ship played a prominent role in the recovery of the Apollo 8 command module, connecting it to the early history of NASA’s space program. Since arriving at Patriots Point in 1975, Yorktown has been preserved as a museum ship and has become the site’s most recognizable landmark.

- USS Laffey, a destroyer

The USS Laffey (DD-724), an Allen M. Sumner-class destroyer, is one of the museum’s most historically significant vessels. Commissioned in 1944, Laffey earned the nickname “The Ship That Would Not Die” after surviving one of the most intense kamikaze attacks of World War II during the Battle of Okinawa, when she withstood repeated strikes while continuing to fight. For her actions in the war, the destroyer received multiple battle stars and recognition for extraordinary resilience under fire.

After World War II, Laffey saw additional service during the Cold War and supported operations throughout the 1950s and 1960s before being decommissioned in 1975. The destroyer joined Patriots Point in 1978 and remains the only Sumner-class destroyer in existence, and one of the few destroyers that had been preserved in the United States.

=== Aircraft collection ===
- Boeing-Stearman N2S-3
- Douglas A-4C Skyhawk
- Douglas AD-4N Skyraider
- Douglas EA-3B Skywarrior
- Douglas SBD-5 Dauntless
- General Motors TBM-3E Avenger
- Goodyear FG-1D Corsair
- Grumman A-6E Intruder
- Grumman E-1B Tracer
- Grumman F-14A Tomcat
- Grumman F4F-3A Wildcat
- Grumman F6F-5K Hellcat
- Grumman S-2E Tracker
- Grumman TF-9J Cougar
- Gyrodyne QH-50 DASH
- Lockheed S-3B Viking
- Ling-Temco-Vought A-7E Corsair II
- McDonnell Douglas F-4J Phantom II
- McDonnell Douglas F/A-18A Hornet
- North American B-25D Mitchell
- Sikorsky SH-3G Sea King
- Vought F-8K Crusader

=== Vietnam Experience ===
- Bell AH-1J SeaCobra
- Bell UH-1D Iroquois
- Bell UH-1M Iroquois
- Boeing Vertol CH-46E Sea Knight
- Sikorsky UH-34D
- M35A2 cargo truck
- M42 Duster mobile anti-aircraft gun
- M101 howitzer artillery gun
- M114 armored fighting vehicle
- Dodge M43 ambulance
- Naval Support Camp
- PBR-105 river patrol boat
- Willys MB

=== Other exhibits ===
- Medal of Honor museum, with biographies of all medal recipients. The Medal of Honor Museum was designated by Congress under the National Medal of Honor Memorial Act in 1999 as a National Medal of Honor Site. It reopened onboard the Yorktown in 2024.

== See also ==
- Battleship Cove
- List of aircraft carriers of the United States Navy
