= USS Glynn =

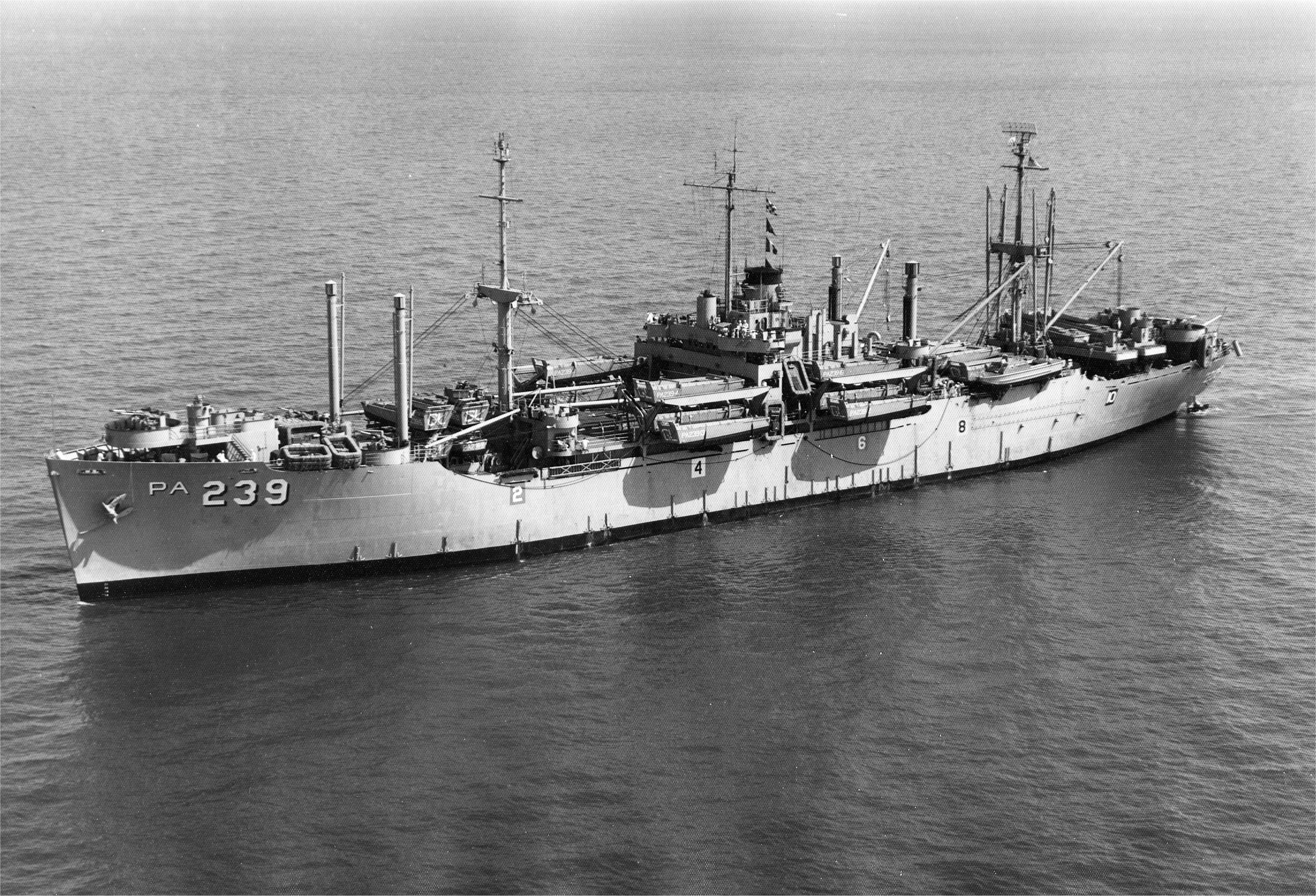

History

United States
- Name: USS Glynn
- Namesake: Glynn County, Georgia
- Builder: Oregon Shipbuilding
- Launched: 25 August 1945
- Sponsored by: Mrs. Homer D. Angell
- Acquired: 17 October 1945
- Commissioned: 17 October 1945
- Decommissioned: 9 September 1955
- Reclassified: As LPA-239, 1 January 1969
- Stricken: 1 July 1960
- Fate: Sold for scrapping, 1 August 1983

General characteristics
- Class & type: Haskell-class attack transport
- Displacement: 6,720 tons (lt), 14,837 t. (fl)
- Length: 455 ft
- Beam: 62 ft
- Draft: 24 ft
- Propulsion: 1 x Joshua Hendy geared turbine, 2 x Babcock & Wilcox header-type boilers, 1 x propeller, designed shaft horsepower 8,500
- Speed: 17.7 knots
- Boats & landing craft carried: 2 x LCM, 12 x LCVP, 3 x LCPU
- Capacity: 86 Officers 1,475 Enlisted
- Crew: 56 Officers, 480 enlisted
- Armament: 1 x 5"/38 caliber dual-purpose gun mount, 1 x quad 40mm gun mount, 4 x twin 40mm gun mounts, 10 x single 20mm gun mounts
- Notes: MCV Hull No. 863, hull type VC2-S-AP5

USS Glynn (APA-239) was a Haskell-class attack transport that was built for service with the US Navy in World War II on the Victory ship design. She was commissioned shortly after the war and consequently never saw action.

Glynn was named after Glynn County, Georgia. She was launched 25 August 1945 under Maritime Commission contract by the Oregon Shipbuilding Corporation of Portland, Oregon, and acquired and simultaneously commissioned 17 October 1945.

== Operational history ==
=== Post-World War II ===
Glynn sailed from San Diego 21 December 1945 on an Operation Magic Carpet voyage to the Philippines and reached Samar on 8 January 1946. After touching Guam and Saipan, she returned to San Pedro, Philippines and sailed thence for battle-scarred Okinawa, arriving 14 April. Underway the next day for the United States, Glynn rode into San Diego Harbor again 30 April at voyage's end.

Two more round trip voyages, both out of San Francisco, brought the busy ship to Kwajalein, Bikini, the Philippines, and Okinawa from 21 May to 28 June 1946, and to Pearl Harbor, returning to the Golden Gate 26 July 1946.

=== Second commission ===
Glynn was decommissioned 12 December 1946 remaining in reserve until recommissioned 3 March 1951 at San Francisco. Training exercises off southern California occupied her until she steamed for the Atlantic, reaching Norfolk, Virginia on 25 July 1951. Subsequently, she conducted peacetime training exercises in the Caribbean and Atlantic, exacting duty which included voyages to Greenland, Labrador, Nova Scotia, Caribbean islands, and operations along the whole length of the Eastern seaboard. In addition, she conducted training cruises for Midshipmen.

=== Final decommission ===
Following inactivation overhaul at New York Glynn put in at Charleston, South Carolina 8 June 1955 where she was decommissioned 9 September 1955. The ship remained in reserve until transferred to the custody of the Maritime Administration (MARAD) on 3 March 1960 and berthed in the James River National Defense Reserve Fleet and permanently transferred to MARAD on 30 June. On 1 July 1960 Glynn was stricken from the Navy List. On 1 January 1969 the type was administratively redesignated LPA with Glynn being designated LPA-239 for Navy purposes.

Glynn was disposed of by MARAD on 1 August 1983 in trade for the Thomas Nelson (1962), a 12,799 GRT C4 type cargo ship, to the Waterman Steamship Corporation and withdrawn from the reserve fleet 16 September 1983. She was resold to Balbao Desquaces Maritimos, S.A., a scapper in Barcelona.
