= VA-106 (U.S. Navy) =

Attack Squadron 106
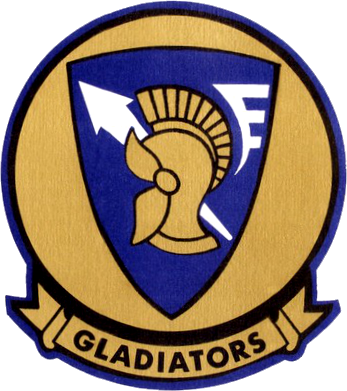
- VA-106 squadron insignia
- Active: 2 January 1945 – 7 November 1969
- Country: United States
- Branch: United States Navy
- Role: Attack
- Part of: Inactive
- Nickname(s): Gladiators
- Engagements: World War II; Korean War; Vietnam War

Aircraft flown
- Attack: F6F-5 Hellcat; F4U/4 Corsair; F8F-2/1B Bearcat; F2H-2 Banshee; F9F-8B Cougar; A4D-2/B/C/E Skyhawk

VA-106 was an Attack Squadron of the United States Navy. Originally established as Bomber-Fighter Squadron Seventeen (VBF-17) on 2 January 1945, it was redesignated Fighter Squadron Six B (VF-6B) on 15 November 1946, redesignated VF-62 on 28 July 1948, redesignated Attack Squadron 106 (VA-106) on 1 July 1955, it was disestablished on 7 November 1969. It was the second US Navy squadron to be designated VA-106.

== Operational history ==
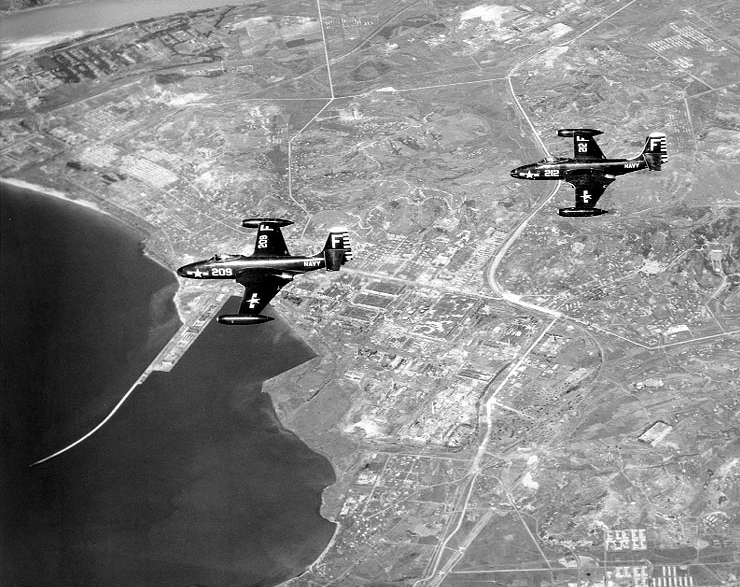
VF-62 F2H-2s over Hungnam in July 1953

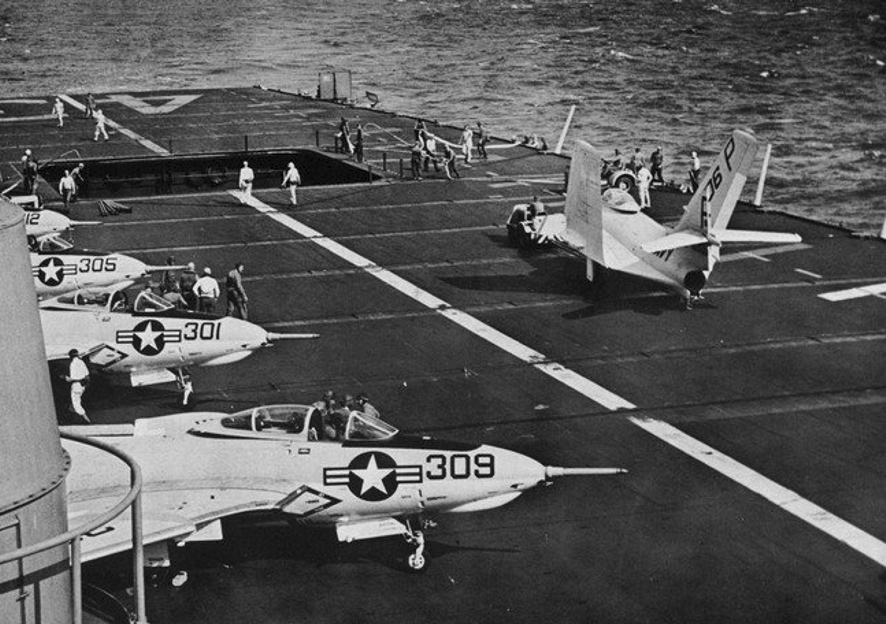
VA-106 F9F-8Bs on USS Coral Sea c.1956

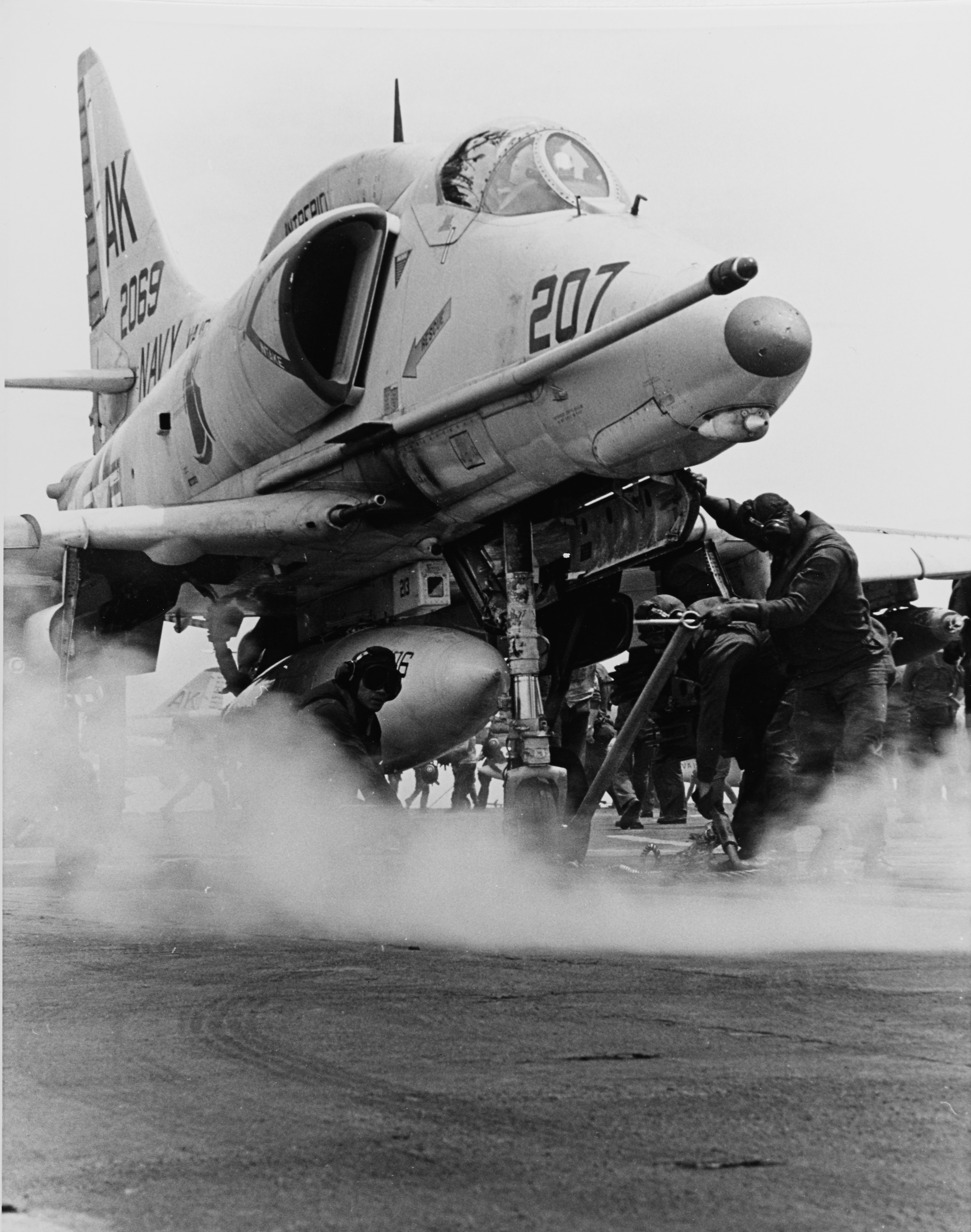
VA-106 A-4E prepares to launch from USS Intrepid in 1968

=== World War II ===
- 16–17 February 1945: The squadron participated in strikes against targets in and around the Tokyo area.
- 20–22 February 1945: Squadron aircraft participated in strikes against Iwo Jima and provided air support for the landings on the island.
- 18–19 March 1945: Major strikes were conducted by squadron aircraft against Kanoya, the largest airfield on Kyushu and against the Japanese Fleet anchored at Kure Naval Base.
- March–May 1945: The squadron conducted strikes in support of the Okinawa campaign
- 7 Apr 1945: The unit participated in the combined task force strikes against the super battleship Yamato and its accompanying escorts, resulting in the sinking of Yamato, two cruisers and three destroyers.
- May 1945: The squadron participated in strikes against Kyushu and Shikoku, hitting aircraft plants and airfields. On 14 May the squadron's commanding officer, LTCDR H. W. Nicholson, was killed in action during a strike against Kyushu.

=== 1950s ===
- 26 April to 4 December 1953, VF-62 was assigned to Carrier Air Group 4 (CVG-4) aboard USS Lake Champlain (CV-39) for a deployment to Korea and the Western Pacific.
- August–November 1956: During the Suez Crisis, USS Coral Sea was ordered to the eastern Mediterranean as tensions increased and France and the United Kingdom began preparations for military action against Egypt. Coral Sea was on station during the American evacuation of Western nationals from Egypt and Israel.
- July 1959: During the NATO exercise Riptide, held off the east coast of the United States, the squadron conducted cross-deck operations with the British carrier HMS Victorious.

=== 1960s ===
- 15–28 November 1960: The squadron operated from USS Shangri-La as part of the patrol force off the coast of Guatemala and Nicaragua to prevent infiltration by communists from Cuba.
- 2–19 June 1961: Following the assassination of dictator General Rafael Trujillo, the squadron operated from USS Shangri-La off the coast of the Dominican Republic.
- 22 October – 28 November 1962: During the Cuban Missile Crisis the squadron was temporary assigned (TAD) to the U.S. Air Force's Nineteenth Air Force, in an alert status aboard the USS Lexington (CV-16) as the USS Shangri-La was in the New York Navy Yard.
- May 1963: The squadron operated from USS Shangri-La in the Caribbean during the period of unrest in Haiti and the Dominican Republic.

=== Vietnam War ===
- 6 June – 15 September 1967, the squadron was assigned to Attack Carrier Air Wing Seventeen (CVW-17) embarked on USS Forrestal for a Vietnam deployment
- 29 Jul 1967: In the USS Forrestal fire the squadron suffered 10 killed and 62 injured.
- 4 June 1968 – 8 February 1969, the squadron was assigned to Attack Carrier Air Wing Ten (CVW-10) embarked on USS Intrepid for a Vietnam deployment.

== Home port assignments ==
The squadron was assigned to these home ports, effective on the dates shown:

- NAS Agana -2 January 1945
- NAS Alameda – 8 July 1945
- NAAS Fallon – September 1945
- NAS Brunswick – February 1946
- NAS Norfolk – 1946
- NAS Oceana – 25 September 1948
- NAS Norfolk – 22 November 1948
- NAS Oceana – 20 January 1949
- NAS Cecil Field – 18 September 1950
- NAS Jacksonville – 13 October 1952
- NAS Cecil Field – December 1954

== Aircraft assignment ==
The squadron first received the following aircraft on the dates shown:

- F6F-5 Hellcat – January 1945
- F4U Corsair – September 1945
- F4U-4 – February 1946
- F8F-2 – 30 June 1948
- F8F-1B – February 1950
- F2H-2 Banshee – 3 August 1950
- F9F-8B Cougar – October 1955
- A4D-2 Skyhawk – 4 June 1958
- A-4C – 18 December 1962
- A-4E – November 1966
- A-4B February 1969
- A-4C March 1969

== See also ==
- VFA-106 "Gladiators" 1984–present
- List of inactive United States Navy aircraft squadrons
- History of the United States Navy
