= VA106 =

- VFA-106, a U.S. Navy strike fighter squadron
- State Route 106 (Virginia)
