= USS Intrepid (DDG-145) =

Future US Navy destroyer

History

United States
- Name: Intrepid
- Namesake: USS Intrepid
- Builder: Ingalls Shipbuilding
- Identification: Hull number: DDG-145
- Status: Authorized

General characteristics
- Class & type: Arleigh Burke-class destroyer
- Displacement: 9,217 tons (full load)
- Length: 510 ft (160 m)
- Beam: 66 ft (20 m)
- Propulsion: 4 × General Electric LM2500 gas turbines 100,000 shp (75,000 kW)
- Speed: 31 knots (57 km/h; 36 mph)
- Complement: 380 officers and enlisted
- Armament: Guns: 1 × 5-inch (127 mm)/62 Mk 45 Mod 4 (lightweight gun); 1 × 20 mm (0.8 in) Phalanx CIWS; 2 × 25 mm (0.98 in) Mk 38 machine gun system; 4 × 0.50 in (12.7 mm) caliber guns; Missiles: 1 × 32-cell, 1 × 64-cell (96 total cells) Mk 41 vertical launching system (VLS): RIM-66M surface-to-air missile; RIM-156 surface-to-air missile; RIM-174A Standard ERAM; RIM-161 anti-ballistic missile; RIM-162 ESSM (quad-packed); BGM-109 Tomahawk cruise missile; RUM-139 vertical launch ASROC; Torpedoes: 2 × Mark 32 triple torpedo tubes: Mark 46 lightweight torpedo; Mark 50 lightweight torpedo; Mark 54 lightweight torpedo
- Armor: Kevlar-type armor with steel hull. Numerous passive survivability measures.
- Aircraft carried: 2 × MH-60R Seahawk helicopters
- Aviation facilities: Double hangar and helipad

USS Intrepid (DDG-145) is the planned 95th Arleigh Burke-class (Flight III) Aegis guided missile destroyer of the United States Navy. She will be the fifth US Navy ship named Intrepid and the first Arleigh Burke class destroyer not named after a person.

== Design and construction ==
As a Flight III Arleigh Burke-class destroyer, she would be mounted with the more powerful AN/SPY-6 radar compared to her sister ships. This radar, and other modifications, would allow Flight III destroyers to serve as a replacement for the air-defense roles of Ticonderoga-class cruisers.

She was ordered in 2023 as part of a larger 5-year plan to build 9 Flight III ships. In 2025, she was named after the four previous US Navy ships to bear the name Intrepid.
