= USS Intrepid =

USS Intrepid may refer to the following ships of the United States Navy:

- USS Intrepid (1798), an armed ketch captured as a prize by the US Navy on 23 December 1803. Later used by Commodore Stephen Decatur on a mission to enter Tripoli harbor and destroy the captured USS Philadelphia. The vessel was later exploded in the harbor of Tripoli 4 September 1804.
- USS Intrepid (1874), an experimental steam torpedo ram commissioned 31 July 1874 and sold 9 May 1892
- USS Intrepid (1904), a training and receiving ship launched 8 October 1904 and sold 20 December 1921
- USS Intrepid (CV-11), an aircraft carrier launched 26 April 1943 and decommissioned 15 March 1974. Intrepid opened as a museum in New York City during August 1982 and is designated as a National Historic Landmark.
- USS Intrepid (DDG-145), a planned Flight III Arleigh Burke-class guided missile destroyer.

== See also ==
- Intrepid was the name of the Lunar Module on Apollo 12
