= USS Intrepid (CV-11) =

Essex-class aircraft carrier of the US Navy

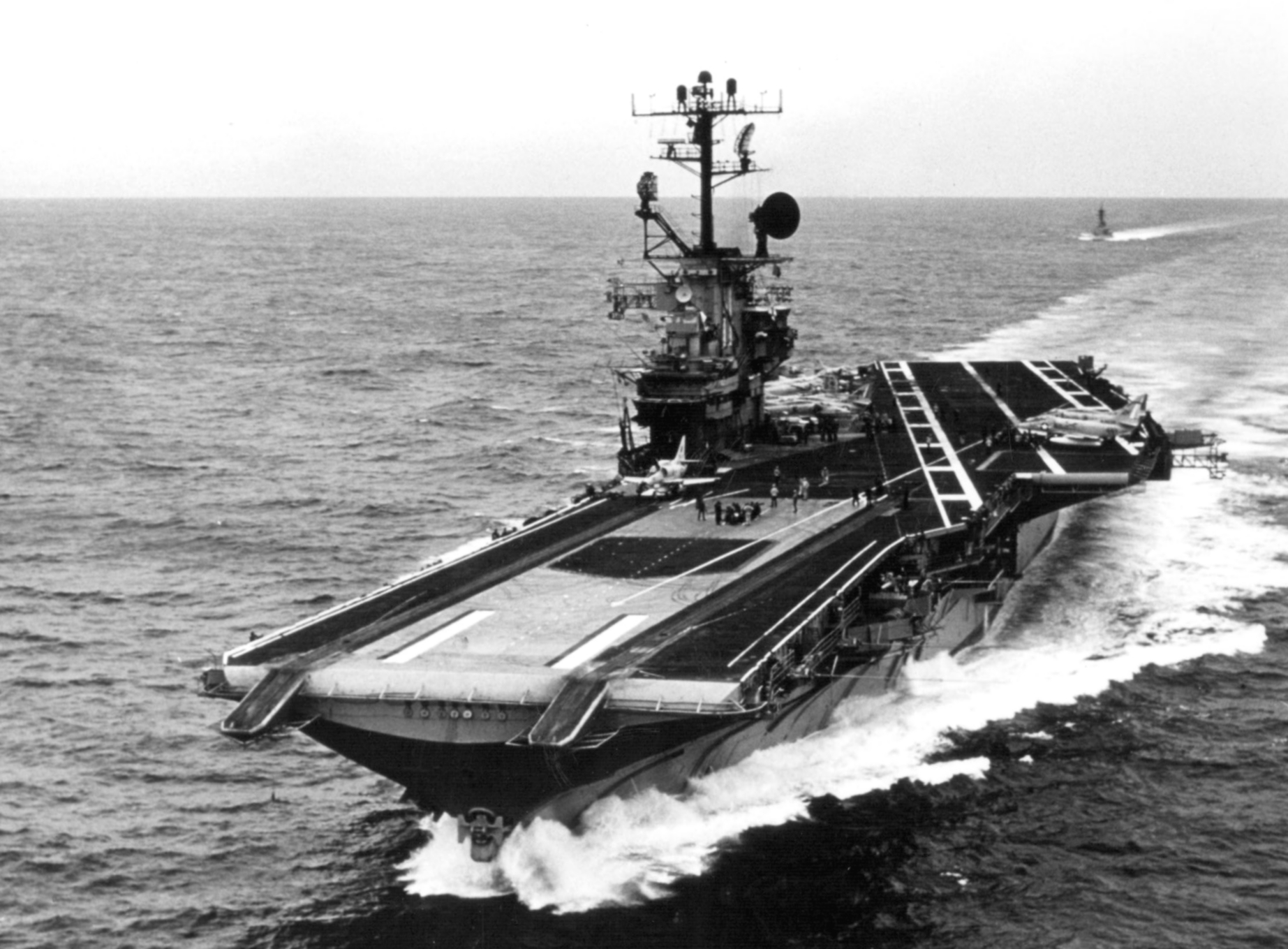
- USS Intrepid on 17 October 1968

History

United States
- Name: Intrepid
- Namesake: USS Intrepid (1904)
- Ordered: 3 July 1940
- Builder: Newport News Shipbuilding
- Laid down: 1 December 1941
- Launched: 26 April 1943
- Commissioned: 16 August 1943
- Decommissioned: 15 March 1974
- Reclassified: CVA-11, 1 October 1952; CVS-11, 31 Mar 1962
- Stricken: 23 February 1982
- Motto: In Mare In Caelo "On the sea, in the sky"
- Status: Museum ship at the Intrepid Museum in New York City

General characteristics
- Class & type: Essex-class aircraft carrier
- Displacement: 27,100 long tons (27,500 t) (standard); 36,380 long tons (36,960 t) (full load)
- Length: 820 feet (249.9 m) (wl); 872 feet (265.8 m) (o/a)
- Beam: 93 ft (28.3 m)
- Draft: 34 ft 2 in (10.41 m)
- Installed power: 8 × Babcock & Wilcox boilers; 150,000 shp (110,000 kW)
- Propulsion: 4 × geared steam turbines; 4 × screw propellers
- Speed: 33 knots (61 km/h; 38 mph)
- Range: 14,100 nmi (26,100 km; 16,200 mi) at 20 knots (37 km/h; 23 mph)
- Complement: 2,600 officers and enlisted men
- Armament: 12 × 5 in (127 mm) DP guns; 32 × 40 mm (1.6 in) AA guns; 46 × 20 mm (0.8 in) AA guns
- Armor: Waterline belt: 2.5–4 in (64–102 mm); Deck: 1.5 in (38 mm); Hangar deck: 2.5 in (64 mm); Bulkheads: 4 in (102 mm)
- Aircraft carried: 36 × Grumman F4F Wildcat; 36 × Douglas SBD Dauntless; 18 × Grumman TBF Avenger

USS Intrepid (CV/CVA/CVS-11), also known as The Fighting "I", is one of 24 Essex-class aircraft carriers built during World War II for the United States Navy. She is the fourth US Navy ship to bear the name. Commissioned in August 1943, Intrepid participated in several campaigns in the Pacific Theater of Operations, including the Battle of Leyte Gulf.

Decommissioned shortly after the end of the war, she was modernized and recommissioned in the early 1950s as an attack carrier (CVA), and then eventually became an antisubmarine carrier (CVS). In her second career, she served mainly in the Atlantic, but also participated in the Vietnam War. She was the recovery ship for a Mercury and a Gemini space mission. Because of her prominent role in battle, she was nicknamed "the Fighting I", while her frequent bad luck and time spent in dry dock for repairs—she was torpedoed once and hit in separate attacks by four Japanese kamikaze aircraft—earned her the nicknames "Decrepit" and "the Dry I".

Decommissioned for the second time in 1974, she was put into service as a museum ship in 1982 as the foundation of the Intrepid Sea, Air & Space Museum in New York City.

Due to being perceived as a jinxed ship during WWII, the Intrepid had picked up the nicknames "Evil I" and "Decrepid" during its service.

== Service history ==
The keel for Intrepid was laid down on 1 December 1941 in Shipway 10 at the Newport News Shipbuilding & Dry Dock Co., Newport News, Virginia, days before the Japanese attack on Pearl Harbor and the United States' entrance into World War II. She was launched on 26 April 1943, the fifth Essex-class aircraft carrier to be launched. She was sponsored by the wife of Vice Admiral John H. Hoover. On 16 August 1943, she was commissioned with Captain Thomas L. Sprague in command before heading to the Caribbean for shakedown and training. She thereafter returned to Norfolk, before departing once more on 3 December, bound for San Francisco. She proceeded on to Pearl Harbor, Hawaii, arriving there on 10 January, where she began preparations to join the rest of the Pacific Fleet for offensive operations against the Imperial Japanese Navy.

=== World War II ===
==== Central Pacific operations ====
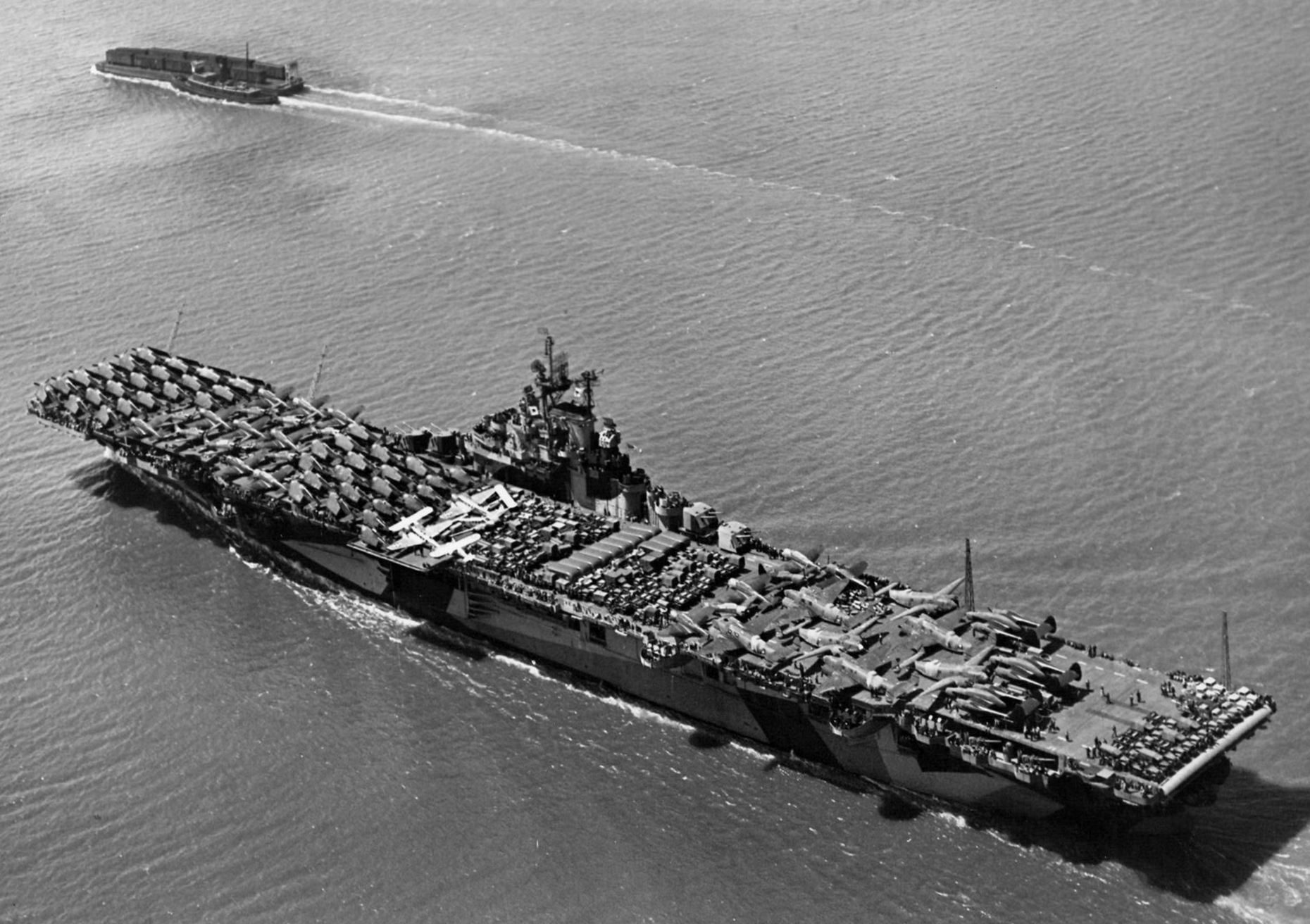
Intrepid off Hunter's Point in June 1944, her deck loaded with aircraft to be transported to the Pacific Theater

Intrepid joined the Fast Carrier Task Force, then Task Force 58 (TF 58), for the next operation in the island-hopping campaign across the Central Pacific: the Gilbert and Marshall Islands campaign. On 16 January 1944, Intrepid, her sister ship Essex, and the light carrier Cabot left Pearl Harbor to conduct a raid on islands in the Kwajalein Atoll from 29 January to 2 February. The three carriers' air group destroyed all 83 Japanese aircraft stationed on Roi-Namur in the first two days of the strikes, before Marines went ashore on neighboring islands on 31 January in the Battle of Kwajalein. That morning, aircraft from Intrepid attacked Japanese beach defenses on Ennuebing Island until ten minutes before the first Marines landed. The Marines quickly took the island and used it as a fire base to support the follow-on attack on Roi.

After the fighting in the Kwajalein Atoll finished, on 3 February, Intrepid and the rest of TF 58 proceeded to launch Operation Hailstone, a major raid on the main Japanese naval base in the Central Pacific, Truk Lagoon. From 17 to 19 February, the carriers pounded Japanese forces in the lagoon, sinking two destroyers and some 200,000 GRT of merchant ships. The strikes demonstrated the vulnerability of Truk, as the Japanese had already withdrawn their heavy surface units prior to the raid. Intrepid did not emerge from the operation unscathed, however; on the night of 17–18 February, a Rikko type Torpedo Bomber from the 755th Kōkūtai (Genzan Air Group) flying from Tainan (given the designation "Raid Easy" by Intrepid's CIC) attacked and torpedoed the carrier near her stern. The torpedo struck 15 ft (5 m) below the waterline, jamming the ship's rudder to port and flooding several compartments and killing 11 sailors. Sprague was able to counteract the jammed rudder for two days by running the port side screw at high speed while idling the starboard screw, until high winds overpowered the improvised steering. The crew then jury-rigged a sail out of scrap canvas and hatch covers, which allowed the ship to return to Pearl Harbor, where she arrived on 24 February. Temporary repairs were effected there, after which Intrepid steamed on 16 March, escorted by the destroyer USS Remey, to Hunters Point Naval Shipyard in San Francisco for permanent repairs, arriving there six days later.

The work was completed by 9 June, and Intrepid began two months of training around Pearl Harbor. Starting in early September, Intrepid joined operations in the western Caroline Islands; the Fast Carrier Task Force was now part of the Third Fleet under Admiral William Halsey Jr., and had been renamed Task Force 38. On 6 and 7 September, she conducted air strikes on Japanese artillery batteries and airfields on the island of Peleliu, in preparation for the invasion of Peleliu. On 9 and 10 September, she and the rest of the fleet moved on to attack airfields on the island of Mindanao in the Philippines, followed by further strikes on bases in the Visayan Sea between 12 and 14 September. On 17 September, Intrepid returned to Pelelieu to provide air support to the Marines that had landed on the island two days before.

==== Philippines campaign ====
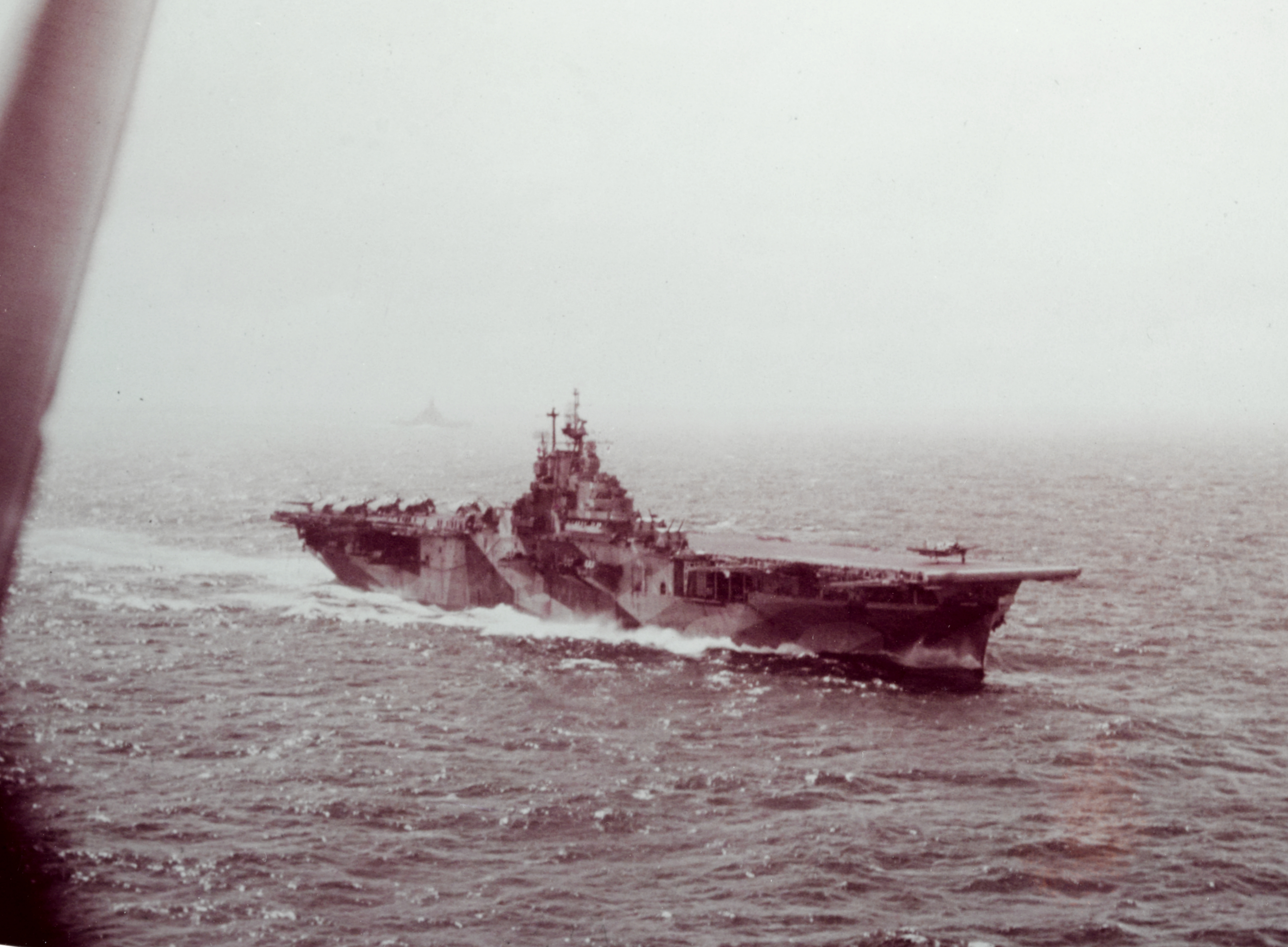
Intrepid launching an aircraft during the Battle of Leyte Gulf

Intrepid and the other carriers then returned to the Philippines to prepare for the Philippines campaign. At this time, Intrepid was assigned to Task Group 38.2. In addition to targets in the Philippines themselves, the carriers also struck Japanese airfields on the islands of Formosa and Okinawa to degrade Japanese air power in the region. On 20 October, at the start of the Battle of Leyte, Intrepid launched strikes to support Allied forces as they went ashore on the island of Leyte. By this time Halsey had reduced the carriers of TG 38.2, commanded by Rear Admiral Gerald F. Bogan aboard Intrepid, to just Intrepid, Cabot, and the light carrier Independence.

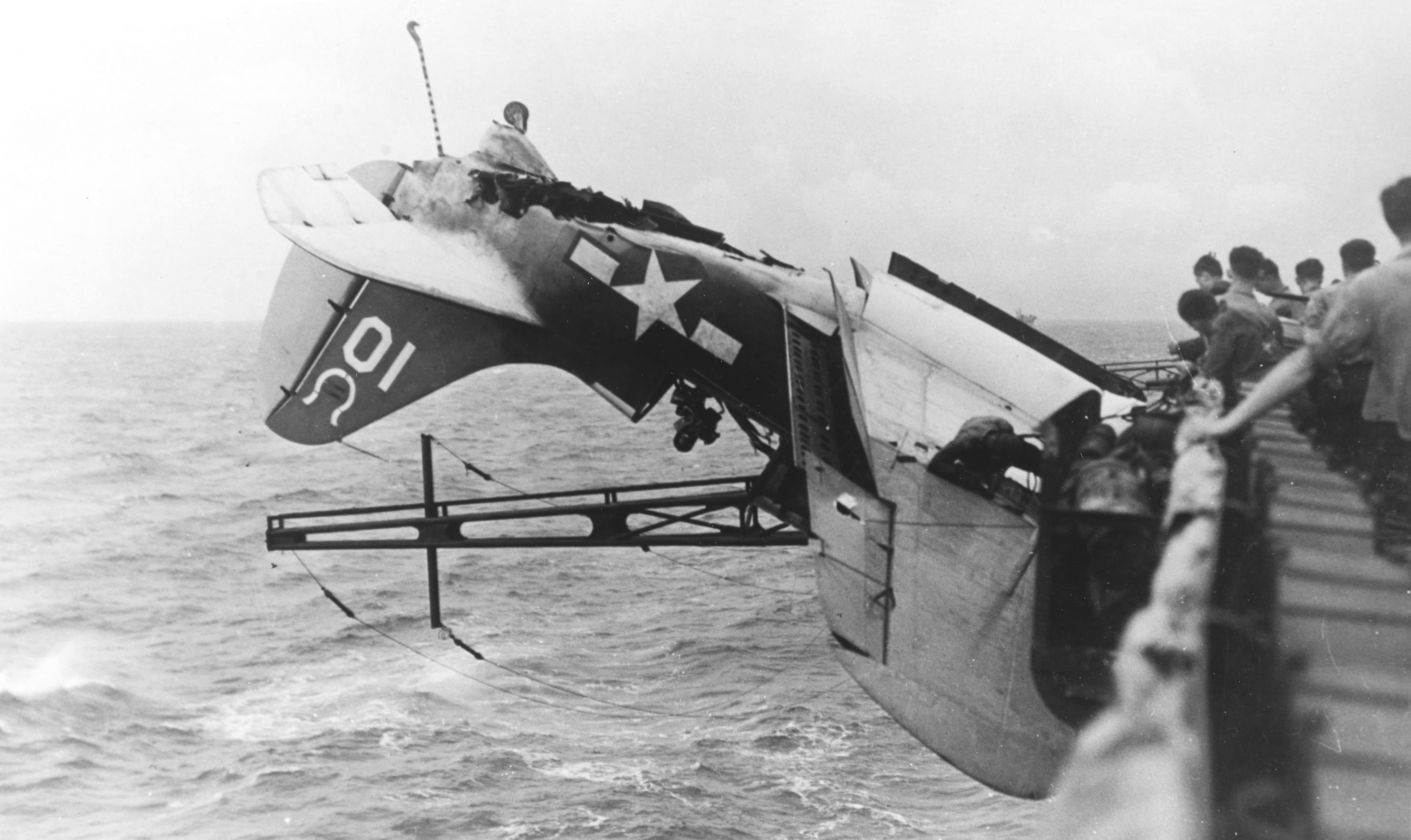
A Curtiss SB2C-3 Helldiver caught in Intrepid's aft radio mast after a night landing accident on 30 October 1944

Between 23 and 26 October, the Japanese Navy launched a major operation to disrupt the Allied landings in the Philippines, resulting in the Battle of Leyte Gulf. On the morning of 24 October, a reconnaissance aircraft from Intrepid spotted Vice Admiral Takeo Kurita's flagship, Yamato. Two hours later, Intrepid and Cabot launched a strike on Kurita's Center Force, initiating the Battle of the Sibuyan Sea; this included eight Curtiss SB2C Helldiver dive bombers from Intrepid, which launched their attack at 10:27. One 500-pound (230 kg) bomb struck the roof of Turret No. 1, failing to penetrate. Two minutes later, the battleship Musashi was struck starboard amidships by a torpedo from a Grumman TBF Avenger, also from Intrepid. The Japanese shot down two Avengers. Another eight Helldivers from Intrepid attacked Musashi again at around noon, scoring two more hits, with two Helldivers shot down. Three minutes later, nine Avengers attacked from both sides of the ship, scoring three torpedo hits on the port side. Further strikes from Essex and Lexington inflicted several more bomb and torpedo hits at around 13:30. At 15:25, 37 aircraft from Intrepid, the fleet carrier Franklin, and Cabot attacked Musashi, hitting her with 13 bombs and 11 torpedoes for the loss of three Avengers and three Helldivers. In addition to the loss of Musashi, many of Kurita's other ships, including battleships Yamato, Nagato and Haruna, and heavy cruiser Myōkō were damaged in the attacks, forcing him to break off the operation temporarily.

After Kurita's force began to withdraw, Halsey ordered TF 38 to steam north to intercept the aircraft carriers of the Northern Force, commanded by Vice Admiral Jisaburō Ozawa. Bogan correctly perceived that Ozawa's force was intended to lure TF 38 away from the landing area to allow Kurita to attack it, but Halsey overruled him and several other Task Group commanders who voiced similar concerns. Early on 25 October, aircraft from Intrepid and the other carriers launched a strike on the Japanese carriers. Aircraft from Intrepid scored hits on the carrier Zuihō and possibly the carrier Zuikaku. Further strikes throughout the morning resulted in the sinking of four Japanese aircraft carriers and a destroyer in the Battle off Cape Engaño. Halsey's preoccupation with the Northern Force allowed Kurita the respite he needed to turn his force back to the east, push through the San Bernardino Strait, where it engaged the light forces of escort carriers, destroyers, and destroyer escorts that were directly covering the landing force in the Battle off Samar. Kurita nevertheless failed to break through the American formation, and ultimately broke off the attack.

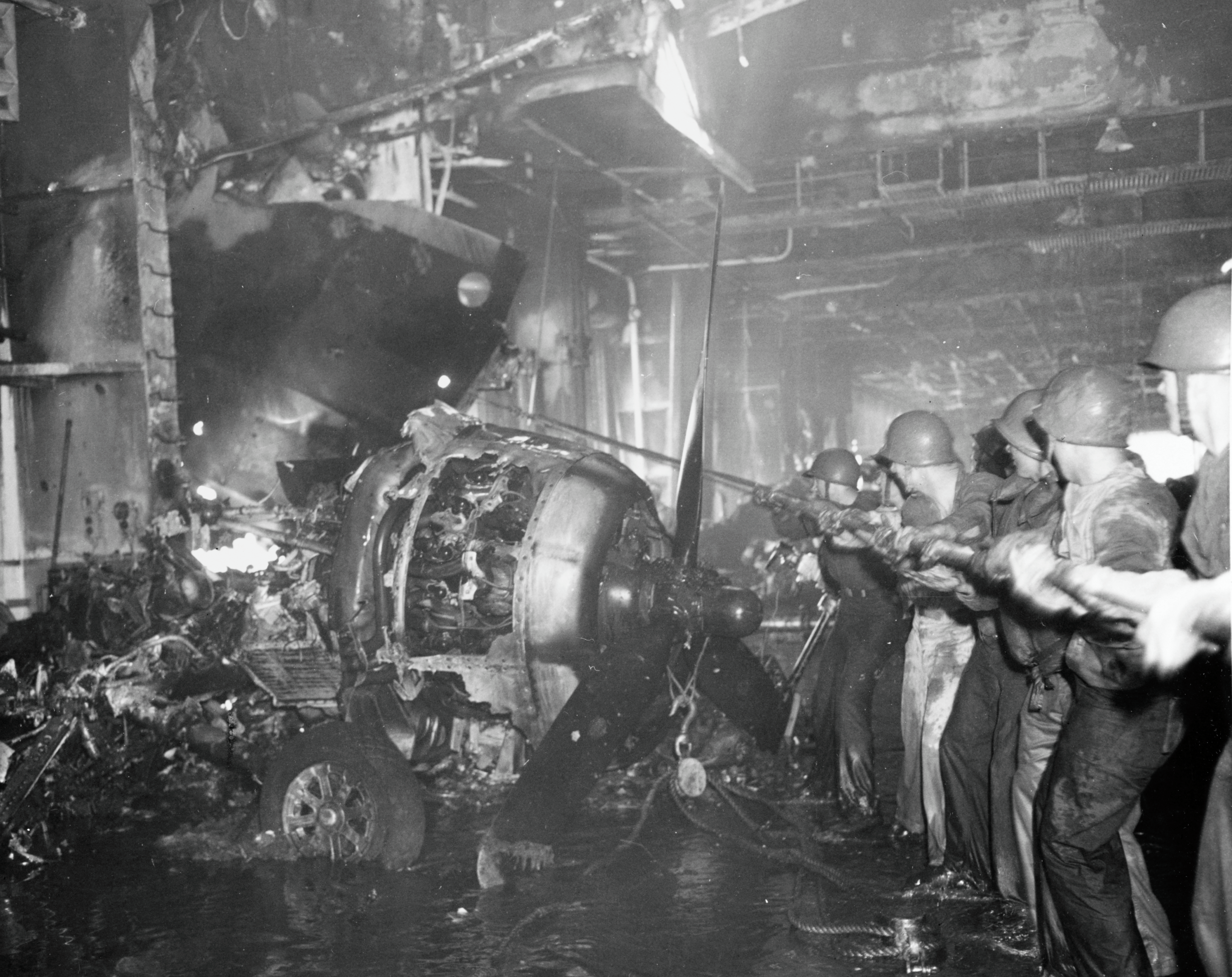
Crew members clearing away wreckage in the hangar deck after Intrepid was hit by Kamikazes, 25 November 1944

On 27 October, TG 38.2 returned to operations over Luzon; these included a raid on Manila on 29 October. That day, a kamikaze suicide aircraft hit Intrepid on one of her port side gun positions; ten men were killed and another six were wounded, but damage was minimal. A Japanese air raid on 25 November struck the fleet shortly after noon. Two kamikazes crashed into Intrepid, killing sixty-nine men and causing a serious fire. The ship remained on station, however, and the fires were extinguished within two hours. She was detached for repairs the following day, and reached San Francisco on 20 December.

==== Okinawa and Japan, March–December 1945 ====
In the middle of February 1945, back in fighting trim, the carrier steamed for Ulithi, arriving on 13 March. She set off westward for strikes on Japan on 14 March and four days later launched strikes against airfields on Kyūshū. That morning a twin-engined Japanese G4M "Betty" kamikaze broke through a curtain of defensive fire, turned toward Intrepid, and exploded 50 ft (15 m) off Intrepid's forward boat crane. A shower of flaming gasoline and aircraft parts started fires on the hangar deck, but damage control teams quickly put them out. Intrepid's aircraft joined attacks on remnants of the Japanese fleet anchored at Kure damaging 18 enemy naval vessels, including battleship Yamato and carrier Amagi. The carriers turned to Okinawa as L-Day, the start of the most ambitious amphibious assault of the Pacific war, approached. Between 26 and 27 March, their aircraft attacked the Ryūkyūs, softening up enemy defensive works. The invasion began on 1 April. Intrepid aircraft flew support missions against targets on Okinawa and made neutralizing raids against Japanese airfields in range of the island. On 16 April, during an air raid, a Japanese aircraft dived into Intrepid's flight deck; the engine and part of the fuselage penetrated the deck, killing eight men and wounding 21. In less than an hour the flaming gasoline had been extinguished; three hours after the crash, aircraft were again landing on the carrier.

On 17 April, Intrepid retired homeward via Ulithi. She made a stop at Pearl Harbor on 11 May, arriving at San Francisco for repairs on 19 May. On 29 June, the carrier left San Francisco. On 6 August, her aircraft launched strikes against Japanese on bypassed Wake Island. Intrepid arrived at Eniwetok on the next day. On 15 August, when the Japanese surrendered, she received word to "cease offensive operations." Intrepid got under way on 21 August to support the occupation of Japan. On 2 December, she left Yokosuka and arrived at San Pedro, California, on 15 December.

=== Post-war ===
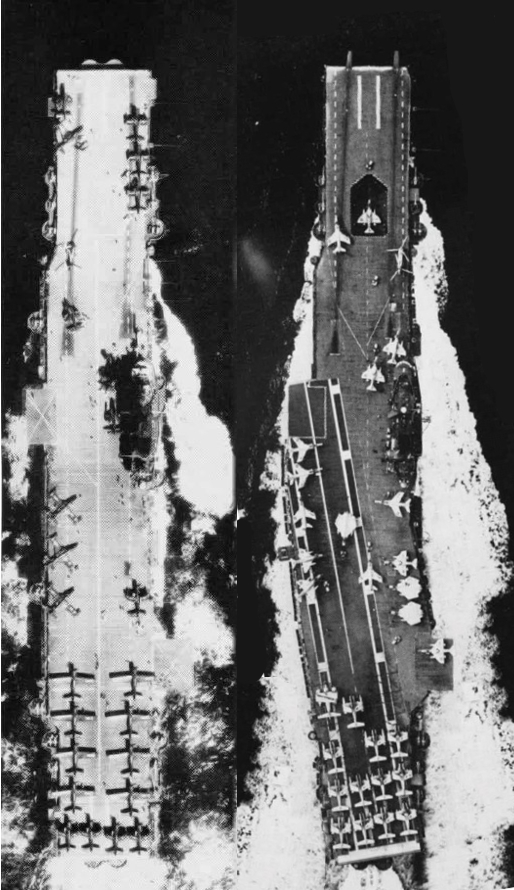
Composite views of USS Intrepid after SCB-27C (left) and SCB-125 (right).

==== Decommissioning and conversion to attack carrier ====
On 4 February 1946, Intrepid moved to San Francisco Bay. The carrier was reduced in status to "commission in reserve" on 15 August, and she was decommissioned on 22 March 1947. After her decommissioning, Intrepid became part of the Pacific Reserve Fleet. On 9 February 1952, she was recommissioned and on 12 March began the voyage to Norfolk, where the carrier received SCB-27C modernization to operate jet aircraft as an attack aircraft carrier. On 9 April, Intrepid was temporarily decommissioned for the modernization at the Norfolk Naval Shipyard. On 1 October, she was reclassified as attack carrier CVA-11 and recommissioned in reserve on 18 June 1954. On 13 October, the carrier became the first to launch aircraft with American-built steam catapults. Two days later, Intrepid became part of the Atlantic Fleet in full commission.

==== 1955–1961 ====
In 1955, Intrepid conducted her shakedown cruise out of Guantánamo Bay. On 28 May, she departed Mayport, Florida, for the first of two deployments in the Mediterranean with the 6th Fleet. Intrepid returned to Norfolk from the second deployment on 5 September. On 29 September, she entered the New York Navy Yard for her SCB-125 modernization, which added an enclosed bow and an angled flight deck. After the end of the modernization in April 1957, Intrepid conducted refresher training out of Guantánamo Bay. In September, she participated in Operation Strikeback, the largest peacetime naval exercise up to that time in history, which simulated a Soviet attack on NATO. In December, operating from Norfolk, she conducted Operation Crosswind, a study of the effects of wind on carrier launches. The study proved that carriers could safely conduct flight operations without turning into the wind and even launch aircraft while steaming downwind. Between 1958 and 1961, Intrepid alternated Mediterranean deployments with operations along the Atlantic coast of the United States and exercises in the Caribbean.

==== 1962–1965 ====
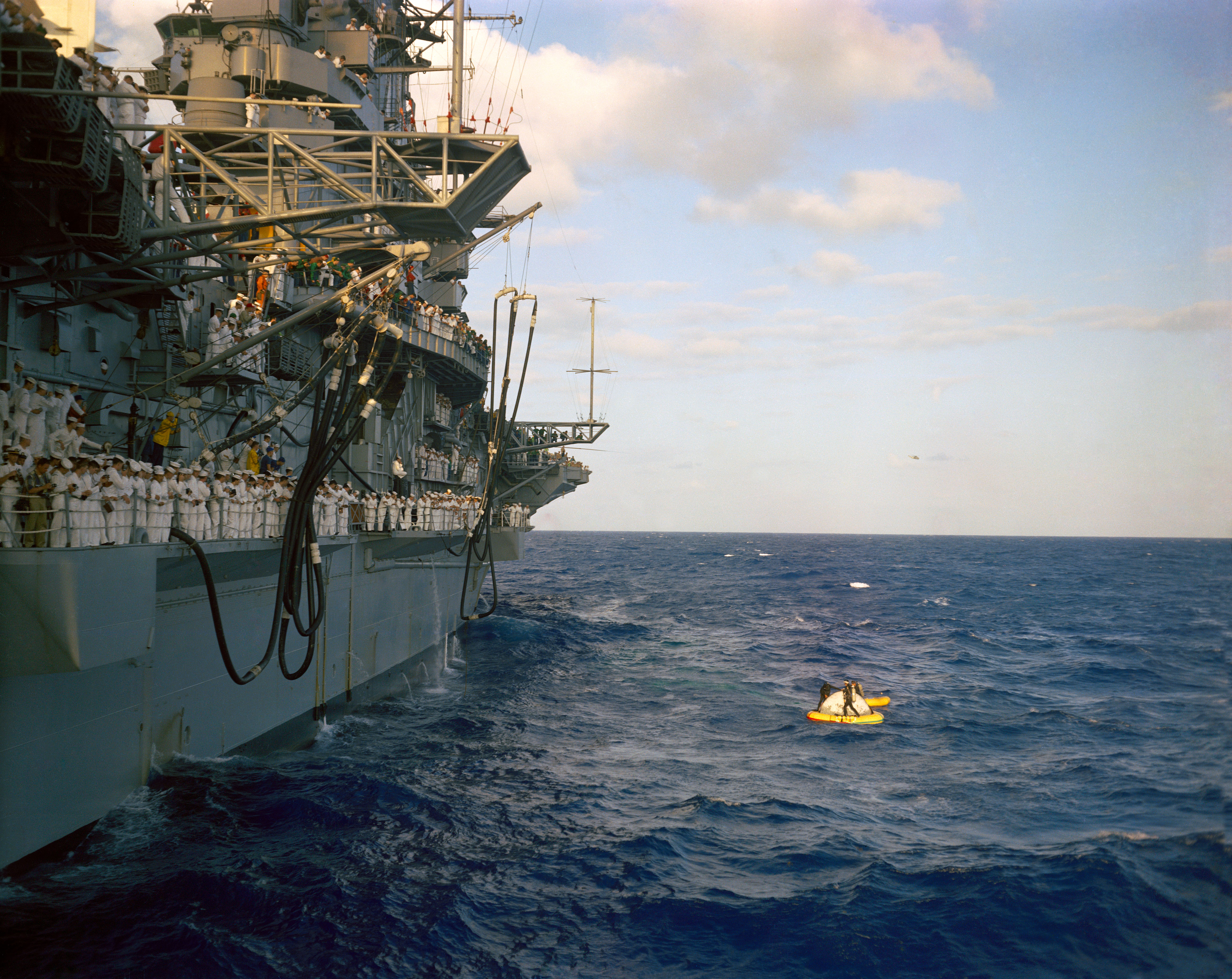
The Gemini 3 spacecraft alongside Intrepid, 23 March 1965.

Intrepid was reclassified to an anti-submarine warfare carrier, CVS-11, on 8 December 1961. On 10 March 1962, the carrier entered the Norfolk Navy Yard for overhaul and refit for her new anti-submarine warfare role. After the completion of the overhaul and refit, she departed on 2 April with Carrier Antisubmarine Air Group 56 embarked. After training exercises, Intrepid was selected as the principal ship in the recovery team for astronaut Scott Carpenter and his Project Mercury space capsule, Aurora 7. Shortly before noon on 24 May 1962, Carpenter splashed down in Aurora 7 northeast of Puerto Rico and several hundred miles from Intrepid. Minutes after he was located by land-based search aircraft, two helicopters from Intrepid, carrying NASA officials, medical experts, Navy frogmen, and photographers, were airborne and headed to the rescue. One of the helicopters picked him up over an hour later and flew him to the carrier, which safely returned him to the United States. Intrepid spent the summer of 1962 training midshipmen at sea, and received a thorough overhaul at Norfolk in the fall.

On 23 January 1963, the carrier departed Hampton Roads for warfare exercises in the Caribbean. In late February, she interrupted these operations to join a sea hunt for the Venezuelan freighter Anzoátegui, which had been hijacked by a group of pro-Castro mutineers led by the second mate. After the mutineers had surrendered at Rio de Janeiro, the carrier returned to Norfolk on 23 March. Intrepid operated along the Atlantic Coast for the next year from Nova Scotia to the Caribbean perfecting her antisubmarine techniques. On 11 June 1964, she left Norfolk carrying midshipmen to the Mediterranean for a hunter-killer at sea training with the 6th Fleet. While in the Mediterranean, Intrepid aided in the surveillance of a Soviet task group. En route home her crew learned that she had won the coveted Battle Efficiency "E" for antisubmarine warfare during the previous fiscal year. In the fall of 1964, the carrier operated along the East Coast. In early September, Intrepid entertained 22 NATO statesmen as part of their tour of U.S. military installations. Between 18 and 19 October 1964, Intrepid was at Yorktown for ceremonies commemorating Lord Cornwallis's surrender 183 years before. The French Ambassador attended the ceremony and presented the U.S. with 12 cannon cast from molds found in the Bastille, replicas of those brought to American forces by Lafayette.

On the night of 21 November, during a brief deployment off North Carolina, airman Jenner Sanders, who had fallen overboard while driving an aircraft towing tractor, was rescued. In early 1965, Intrepid began preparations for a role in NASA's first manned Gemini flight, Gemini 3. On 23 March, Lieutenant Commander John Young and Major Gus Grissom in Molly Brown (the Gemini 3 spacecraft) splashed down some 50 nmi (90 km) from Intrepid, after the first controlled re-entry into the Earth's atmosphere ended their three-orbit flight aboard Gemini 3. A Navy helicopter flew the astronauts to Intrepid for medical examination and debriefing. Later, Intrepid retrieved Molly Brown and returned the spacecraft and astronauts to Cape Kennedy.

==== 1965–1974 ====
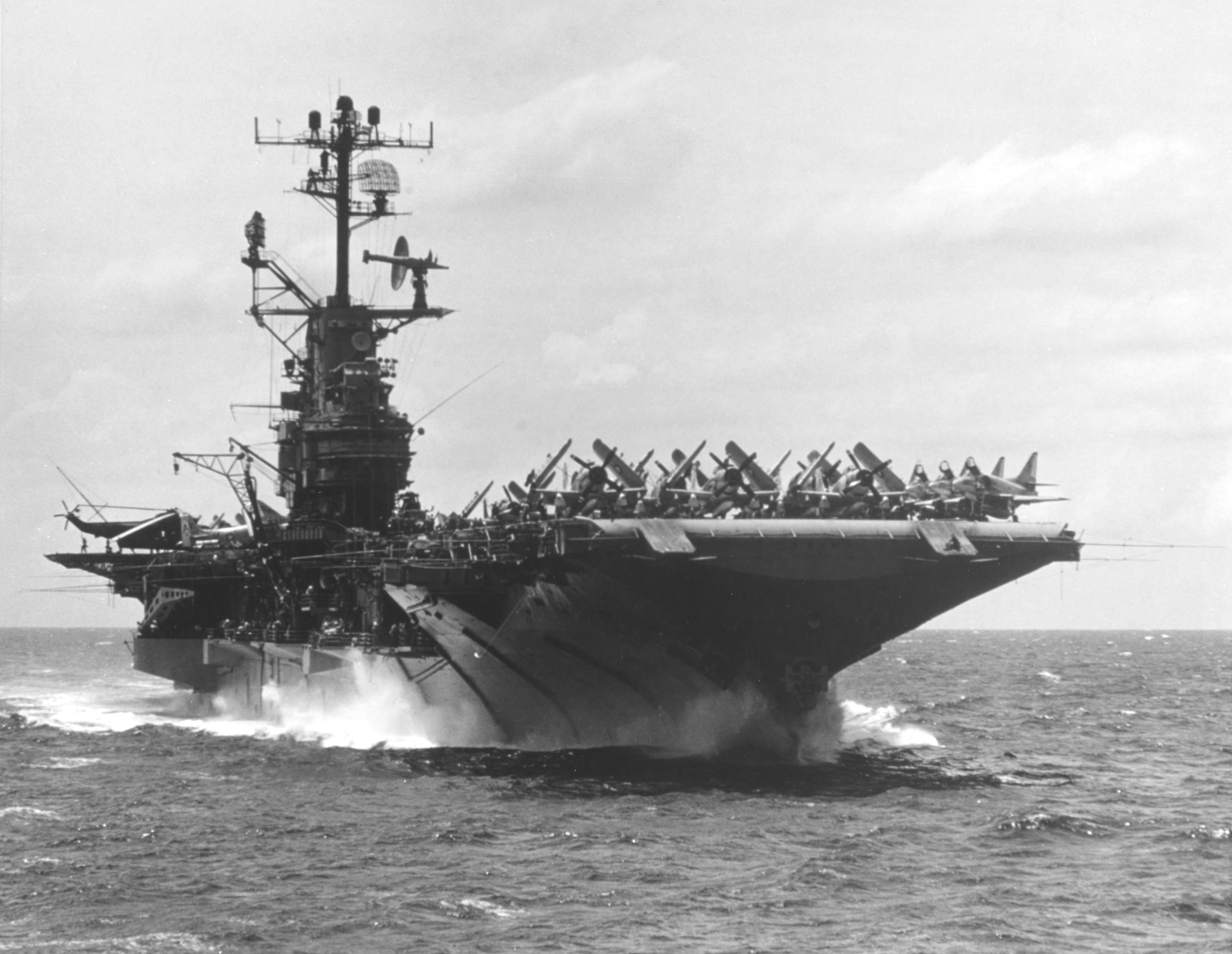
Intrepid operating as an auxiliary attack carrier off Vietnam, 1966.

After this mission Intrepid entered the Brooklyn Navy Yard in April for a major overhaul to bring her back to peak combat readiness. This was the final Fleet Rehabilitation and Modernization job performed by the New York Naval Shipyard, Brooklyn, New York, which was scheduled to close. In September 1965, Intrepid, with her work approximately 75% completed, eased down the East River to moor at the Naval Supply Depot at Bayonne, New Jersey, for the completion of her multimillion-dollar overhaul. After builder's sea trials and fitting out at Norfolk she sailed to Guantánamo Bay on a shakedown cruise.

From April 1966 to February 1969, Intrepid made three Vietnam deployments, with Carrier Air Wing 10 embarked. Mid-1966 found Intrepid with the Pacific Fleet off Vietnam. Nine A-4 Skyhawks and six A-1 Skyraiders, loaded with bombs and rockets, were catapulted in seven minutes, with only a 28-second interval between launches. A few days later planes were launched at 26-second intervals. After seven months of service with the United States Seventh Fleet off Vietnam, Intrepid returned to Norfolk having earned her commanding officer, Captain John W. Fair, the Legion of Merit for combat operations in Southeast Asia.

On 9 October 1966 Lieutenant, junior grade William T. Patton of VA-176 from Intrepid, flying a propeller driven A-1H Skyraider, shot down one MiG-17. For the action, Lieutenant (jg) Patton was awarded the Silver Star.

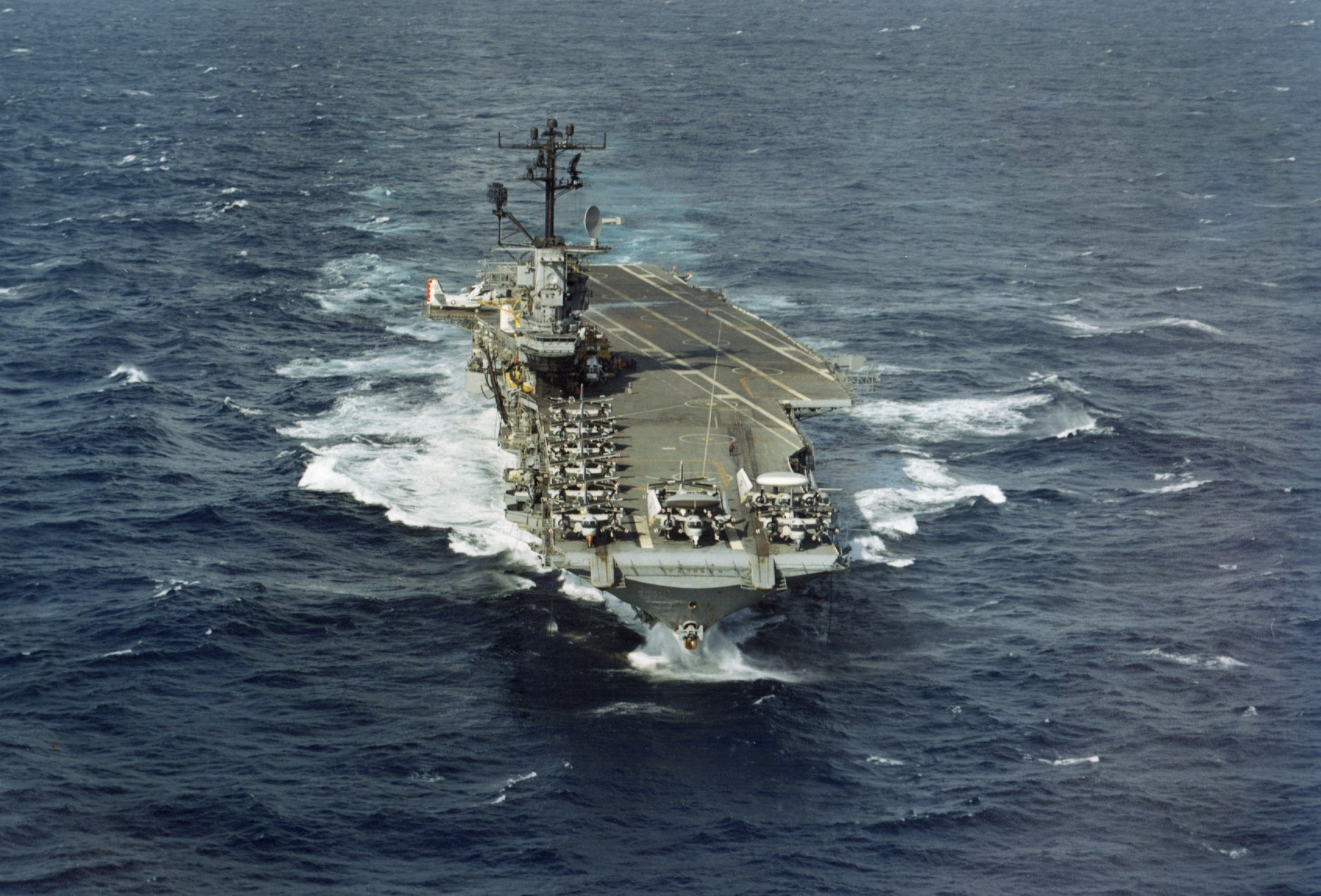
Intrepid operating in the Mediterranean in the 1970s.

In June 1967, Intrepid returned to the Western Pacific by way of the Suez Canal just before it closed due to the Israeli–Arab crisis. There she began another tour with the Seventh Fleet.

In 1968, Intrepid won the Marjorie Sterrett Battleship Fund Award for the Atlantic Fleet. For Carrier Air Wing 10's final cruise aboard Intrepid from 4 June 1968 to 8 February 1969 off Southeast Asia, the wing consisted of VF-111 Detachment 11 (F-8C), VA-106 with the A-4E, VA-66 Waldos (A-4C), VFP-63 Detachment 11 (RF-8G), VA-36 'Roadrunners' (A-4C), VAQ-33 Detachment 11 (EA-1F), VAW-121 Detachment 11 (E-1B), and HC-2 Detachment 11.

In 1969, Intrepid was home ported at Naval Air Station Quonset Point, Rhode Island, relieving Yorktown as the flagship for Commander Carrier Division 16. In the fall, the ship was run aground by Captain Horus E. Moore, but was freed within two hours. From April to October 1971, Intrepid took part in NATO exercises, and made calls in the North Atlantic and Mediterranean ports of Lisbon, Plymouth, Kiel, Naples, Cannes, Barcelona, Hamburg, Copenhagen, Greenock, Rosyth, Portsmouth, and Bergen. During this cruise, submarine detection operations were conducted in the Baltic and at the edge of the Barents Sea above the Arctic Circle, under close scrutiny of Soviet air and naval forces. She subsequently returned to her homeport to be refitted.

Beginning in July 1972, Intrepid participated once again in NATO exercises, visiting Copenhagen, Rotterdam, Bergen, Brussels, Portsmouth and Gourock. Intrepid found herself in the Barents and made round the clock flight operations as she was above the Arctic Circle. She cut her North Atlantic cruise short, returning to Quonset Point for a mini-overhaul. She made her final cruise in the Mediterranean, stopping twice in Barcelona and Malaga Spain; Lisbon, Portugal; Nice, France; Naples, Italy; Palma, Majorca; and Piraeus, Greece once. Due to fuel limitations Intrepid spent as much time in port as she did underway.

On 15 March 1974, Intrepid was decommissioned for the final time.

== Preservation as museum ship ==
- USS Intrepid
- U.S. National Register of Historic Places
- U.S. National Historic Landmark
- New York State Register of Historic Places
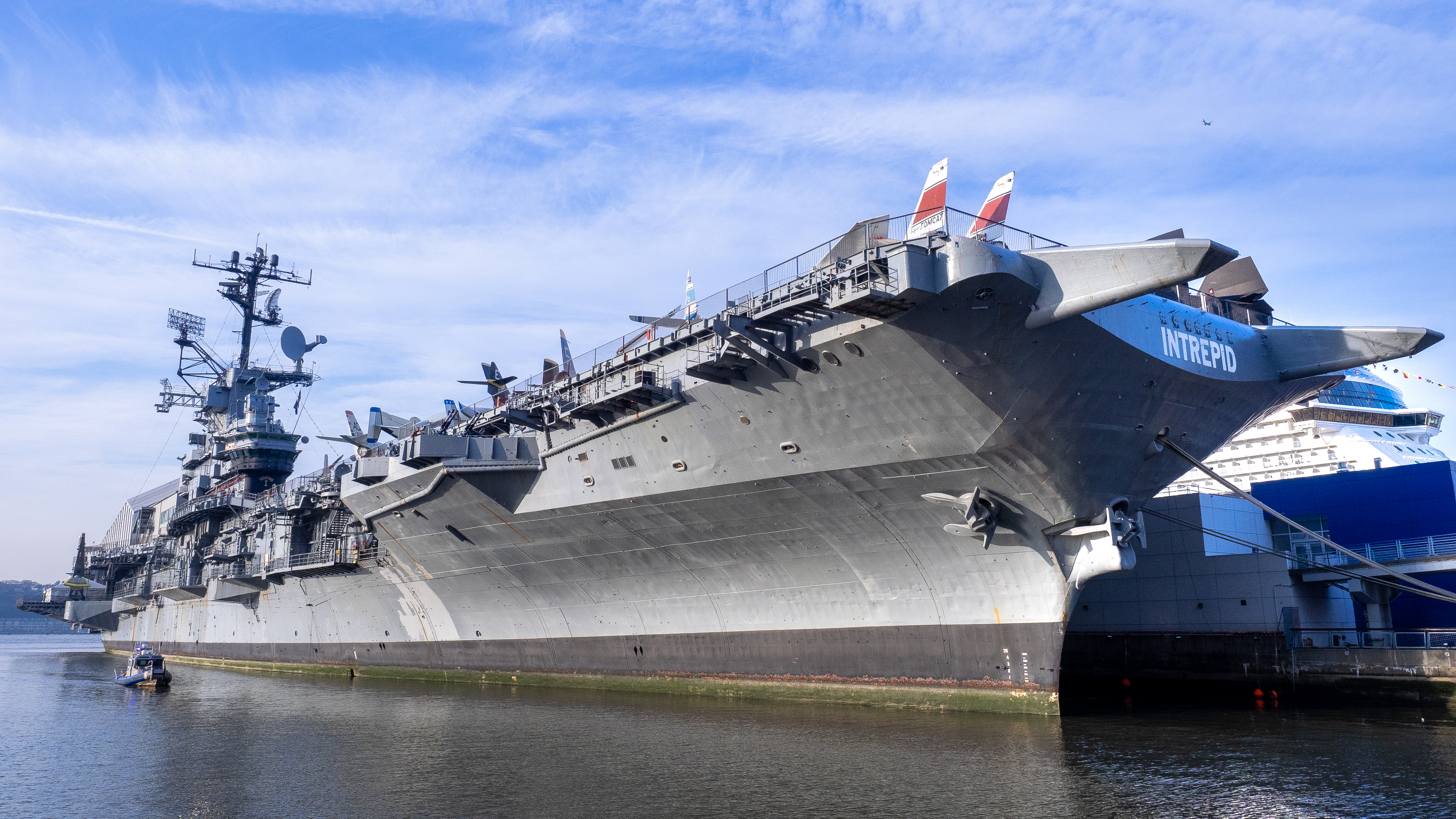
- Intrepid functioning as the Intrepid Museum in New York City

- Location within New York City
- Location: Intrepid Square, New York City
- Coordinates: 40°45′53″N 74°00′04″W
- Built: 1941
- Architect: Newport News Shipbuilding & Dry Dock
- NRHP reference No.: 86000082
- NYSRHP No.: 06101.006464

Significant dates
- Added to NRHP: 14 January 1986
- Designated NHL: 14 January 1986

In 1976, Intrepid was moored at Philadelphia Naval Shipyard in Philadelphia and hosted exhibits as part of the United States Bicentennial celebrations.

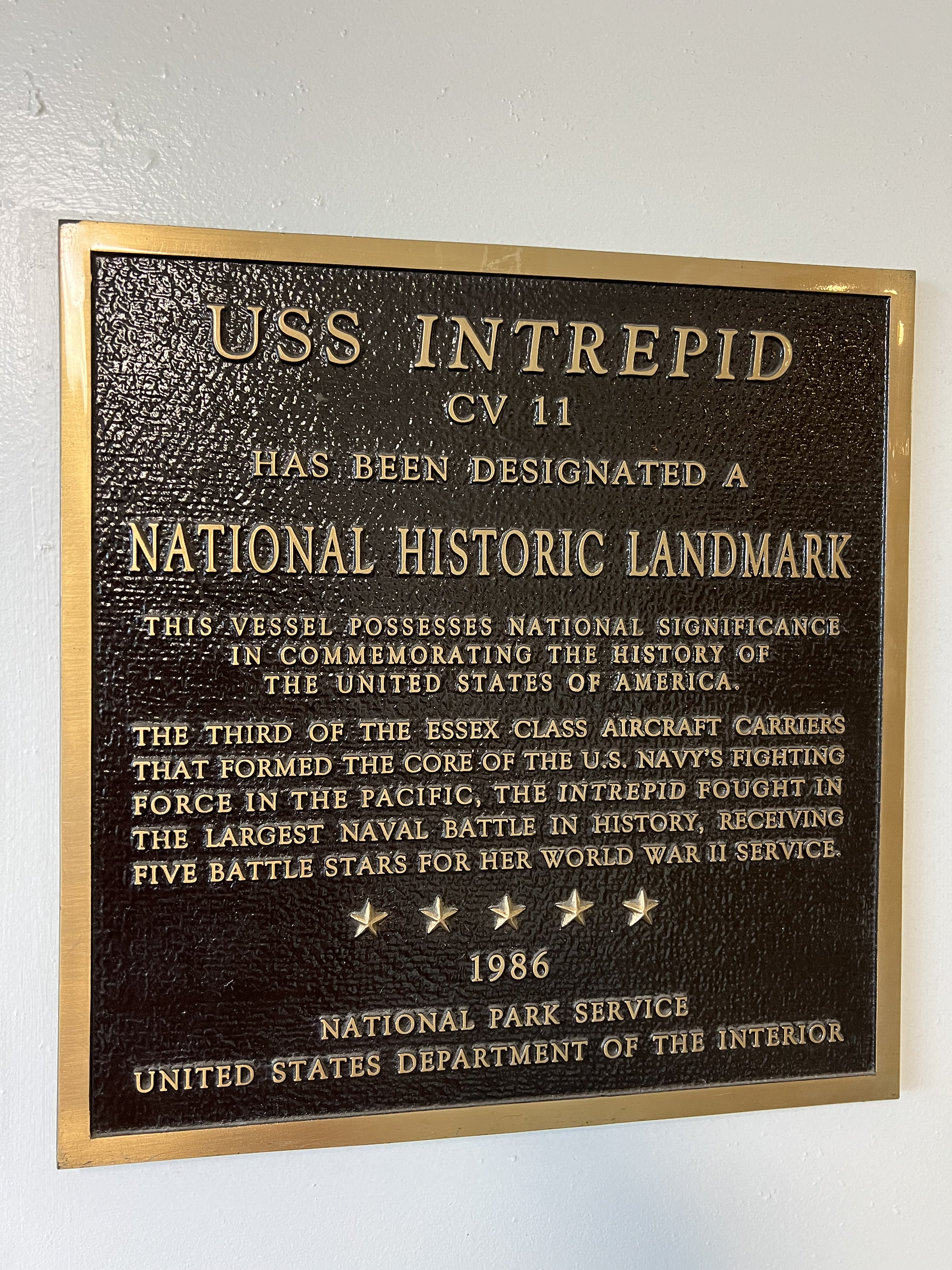
marker on board the ship

Plans originally called for Intrepid to be scrapped after decommissioning, but a campaign led by Michael D. Piccola, president of the nonprofit organization Odysseys in Flight saved the carrier and established her as a museum ship. In August 1982, the ship opened at Pier 86 on the Hudson River in New York City as the Intrepid Sea, Air & Space Museum (later just the Intrepid Museum). Four years later, Intrepid was officially designated as a National Historic Landmark.

Over the years Intrepid hosted many events including wrestling, press conferences, and parties, and served as the FBI operations center after the 11 September 2001 terrorist attacks.

=== 2006–2008 renovation ===
The Intrepid museum operated a fund for the restoration, raising over $60 million to refit Intrepid, to improve the ship's exhibits for visitors, and improve Pier 86.

In early July 2006, it was announced that Intrepid would undergo renovations and repairs, along with Pier 86 itself. The museum closed on 1 October 2006, in preparation for Intrepid's being towed to Bayonne, New Jersey, for repairs, and later Staten Island, New York, for renovation and temporary docking.

On 6 November 2006 the aircraft carrier could not be moved due to 24 years worth of accumulated silt; a $3 million program dredged away the mud and silt over three weeks. On 5 December 2006 Intrepid was removed from her pier and towed to Bayonne.

At Staten Island, Intrepid received an $8 million interior renovation. The forecastle (fo'c'sle, commonly known as the anchor chain room), general berthing quarters and the ship's machine shop were opened to the public for the first time. The hangar deck layout and design were improved. Around 1,200 tons of steel were removed and 339 epoxy-coated steel pilings 60 to 183 feet (18 to 56 m) long were installed. 7,000 US gallons (26,000 L) of paint were used to re-paint the interior, hull, towers, and decks. Total cost of the renovation was $120 million—$55 million for the ship and $65 million for Pier 86.

The carrier was towed back into place on the Hudson River on 2 October 2008 and reopened to the public on 8 November.

=== Since 2008 ===
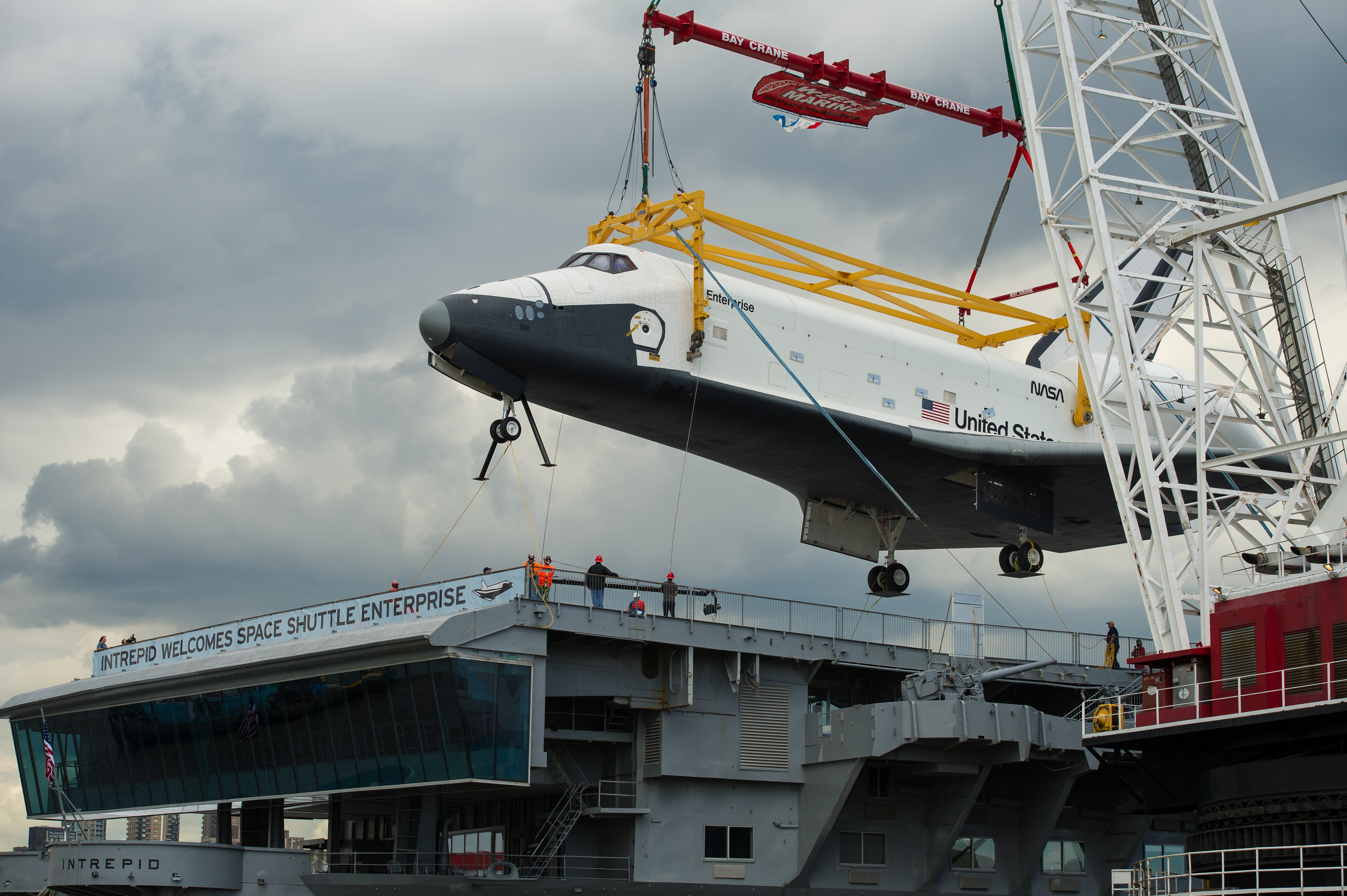
Space Shuttle Enterprise being lifted onto Intrepid, June 2012

On 12 December 2011, ownership of the Space Shuttle Enterprise was officially transferred to the Intrepid Sea, Air & Space Museum in New York City. On 27 April 2012 Enterprise was flown from Dulles International Airport for a fly-by over the Hudson River, New York's JFK International Airport, the Statue of Liberty, the George Washington and Verrazzano–Narrows Bridges, and several other landmarks in the city in an approximately 45-minute "final tour", landing at JFK International Airport. The shuttle was returned by barge to Hangar 1 on 12 May 2012 and taken to the Intrepid Museum in Manhattan on 6 June.

Enterprise went on public display on 19 July 2012, at the Intrepid Museum's new Space Shuttle Pavilion.

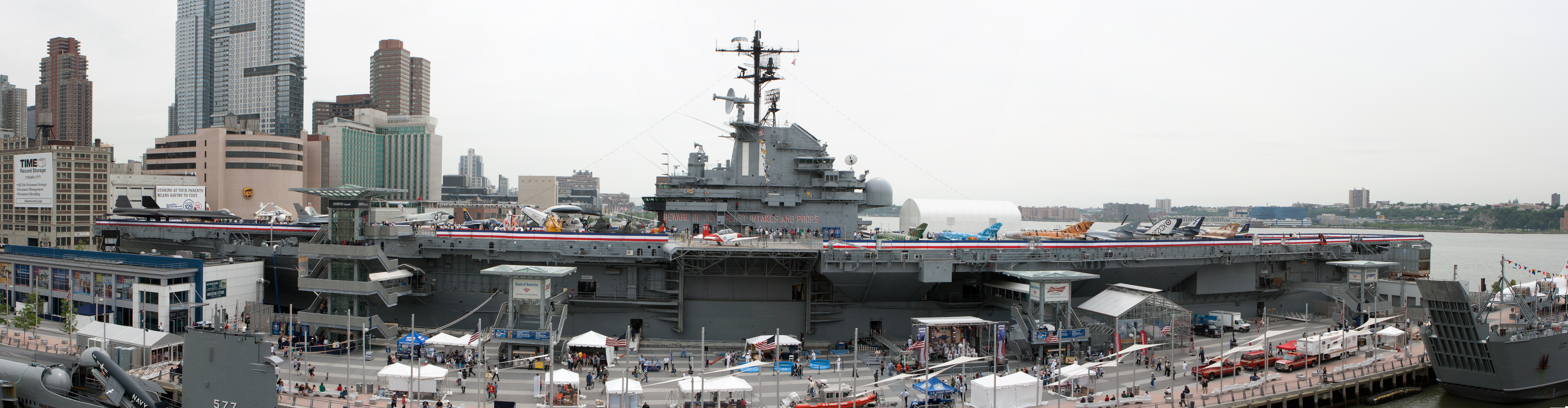
Intrepid with USS Growler in the lower left during Fleet Week 2010

== Awards ==
Intrepid earned five battle stars and the Presidential Unit Citation during World War II, and a further three battle stars for Vietnam service.

Navy Unit Commendation (twice)
Navy Expeditionary Medal	China Service Medal (extended)	American Campaign Medal
Asiatic-Pacific Campaign Medal (5 battle stars)	World War II Victory Medal	Navy Occupation Service Medal (with Asia and Europe clasps)
National Defense Service Medal (twice)	Vietnam Service Medal (3 battle stars)	Philippine Presidential Unit Citation
Republic of Vietnam Meritorious Unit Citation (Gallantry Cross Medal with Palm)	Philippine Liberation Medal	Republic of Vietnam Campaign Medal

== See also ==
- Intrepid Four
- List of aircraft carriers
- List of museum ships
