= 2012 Virginia Beach F/A-18 crash =

Jet crash in Virginia Beach, Virginia, USA

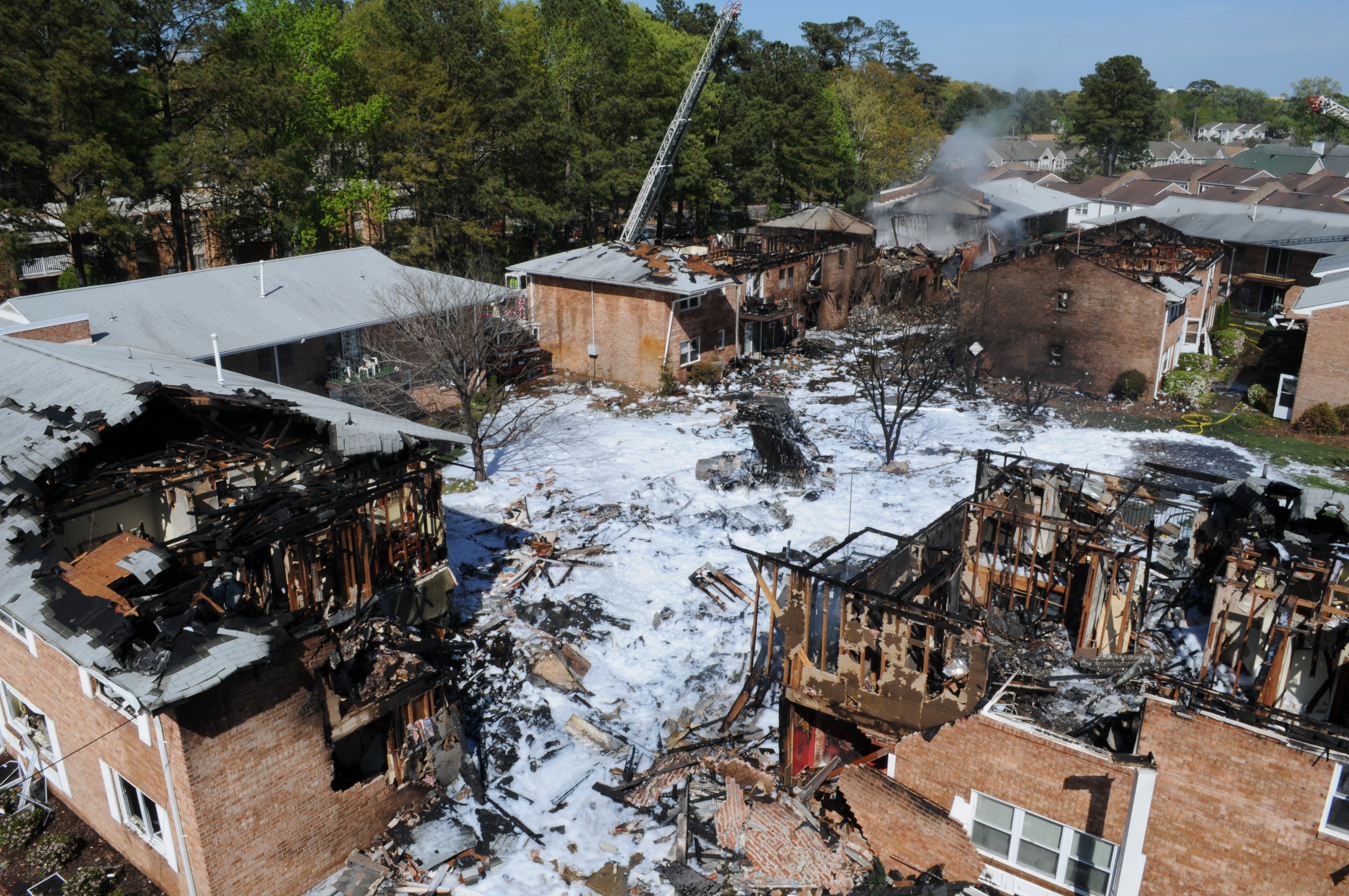
- The Mayfair Mews apartment complex after the crash, the tail section of the F/A-18D still at the site (center)

Accident
- Date: April 6, 2012
- Summary: Dual engine failure on take-off
- Site: Virginia Beach, Virginia, United States; 36°51′4″N 75°59′39″W
- Total fatalities: 0
- Total injuries: 7

Aircraft
- Aircraft type: McDonnell-Douglas F/A-18D Hornet
- Operator: United States Navy
- Registration: 163452/AD-410
- Flight origin: Naval Air Station Oceana, Virginia Beach, Virginia, US
- Occupants: 2
- Crew: 2
- Fatalities: 0
- Injuries: 2
- Survivors: 2

Ground casualties
- Ground fatalities: 0
- Ground injuries: 5

On April 6, 2012, a McDonnell Douglas F/A-18D Hornet jet fighter of the United States Navy crashed into an apartment complex in Virginia Beach, Virginia, after suffering a dual engine failure shortly after take-off on a training flight. The building involved was extensively damaged, but there were no fatalities in the accident.

== Accident ==
At 12:05 p.m. the twin engined Hornet launched from runway 05R at Naval Air Station Oceana on a heading of 053 degrees, conducting a scheduled training exercise. Within seconds of becoming airborne the right engine experienced a failure. The crew immediately selected maximum thrust on the left engine, but it too failed.

Losing altitude, the crew then began dumping fuel to lighten the stricken aircraft and reduce the risk of fire. When the Hornet reached 50 ft (15 m) altitude above ground level (agl) in a nose high attitude, the pilots ejected. One eyewitness, a former Navy SEAL, spoke with Navy Times. He said, "the pilots ejected at the last possible second in an apparent effort to make sure that the plane would not crash into a nearby school".

The F/A-18 plowed into the Mayfair Mews apartment complex that houses about 100 residents, located less than 3 mi (4.8 km) from the departure end of the runway. Total flight time was 70 seconds.

=== Eyewitness accounts ===
One eyewitness looked up and saw the low-flying aircraft begin to spray fuel, drenching his pick-up truck. “The nose was up; it almost looked like it was trying to land...It was maybe 80 or 90 yards over top of me...The engines were straining, but there was no smoke coming out of the plane."

Another noted, “I looked out my window and saw black smoke billowing. There was debris falling in our parking lot. One pilot fell into the apartment complex next to ours. He was all bloody, but conscious.”

A resident said his house started shaking and then the power went out, as he saw a red and orange blaze outside his window. He ran outside, where he saw billowing black smoke and then came upon the pilot as he ran to a friend's home. "I saw the parachute on the house and he was still connected to it, and he was laying [sic] on the ground with his face full of blood", he told a television news reporter. "The pilot said, 'I'm sorry for destroying your house.' "

== Aircraft and crew ==
The aircraft involved was a McDonnell Douglas F/A-18D Hornet with Bu.No. 163452, assigned to Strike Fighter Squadron (VFA) 106.It was built in 1987 and had approximately 6,500 hours on its airframe. The aircrew consisted of a fleet replacement pilot and an experienced instructor. Both of the pilots were from Virginia Beach, but their identities were not released.

== Aftermath ==
The F/A-18 was completely destroyed, the largest section remaining being the empennage including the two engines. The starboard engine Variable Exhaust Nozzle was fully open, while the port engine's nozzle was closed. The apartment complex suffered heavy damage. Three buildings were destroyed and two were damaged, with least forty apartments left uninhabitable. By mid afternoon the fire had been put out and seven people were sent to a hospital, including the two pilots. Later that evening six of the injured were released from the hospital; one pilot remained, listed as being in fair condition.

Two days after the incident on April 8, the Navy began contacting apartment residents to provide payments for immediate needs. Payments began at $2,300 for an individual resident and increased for additional family members.

== Investigation ==
According to Navy investigators the cause of the incident was the failure of both F404-GE-402 engines. A leak caused fuel to enter the right engine's intake, starting a fire. The crew shut down that engine according to proper procedure. As the Pilot in command increased thrust on the left engine it too failed due to an unrelated concern, when its afterburner didn't light. According to Rear Adm. Ted Branch "We have never had this kind of unrelated dual engine mishap in the F-18, it's the first time it's ever happened with this aircraft."
