= VFA-106 =

Strike Fighter Squadron 106
- Active: 27 April 1984 – present
- Country: United States
- Branch: United States Navy
- Type: Fighter/Attack
- Role: Fleet Replacement Squadron
- Part of: Strike Fighter Wing Atlantic
- Garrison/HQ: NAS Oceana
- Nickname: Gladiators
- Colors: Gold and Blue

Commanders
- Commanding Officer: CAPT Jason Papadopoulos
- Executive Officer: CDR Bryan Knick
- Command Master Chief: CMDCM Chuck Eakley

Aircraft flown
- Fighter: F/A-18E/F Super Hornet

Strike Fighter Squadron 106 (VFA-106), also known as the "Gladiators", is a United States Navy F/A-18 Hornet and F/A-18E/F Super Hornet Fleet Replacement Squadron stationed at Naval Air Station Oceana, Virginia. The squadrons radio callsign is Empire.

== Mission ==
As the East Coast Fleet Replacement Squadron, the squadron’s mission is to train Navy F/A-18 Replacement Pilots and Weapon Systems Officers (WSOs) to support fleet commitments. Every 8 weeks, a class of between 10-15 newly winged Navy pilots and Naval Flight Officers begins the 10-month training course in which they learn the basics of air-to-air and air-to-ground missions, culminating in day/night carrier qualification and subsequent assignment to fleet Super Hornet squadrons.

The West Coast counterpart to VFA-106 is VFA-122 at NAS Lemoore, California. VFA-106 is also responsible for transitioning experienced naval aviators from other aircraft, such as the F-14 Tomcat and S-3 Viking, to the Super Hornet. Aircrew returning from non-flying assignments undergo refresher training at VFA-106 prior to returning to the fleet. Additionally, VFA-106 (with the help from the Center of Naval Aviation Technical Training Unit: CNATTU) trains maintenance personnel and provides replacement aircraft to fleet units.

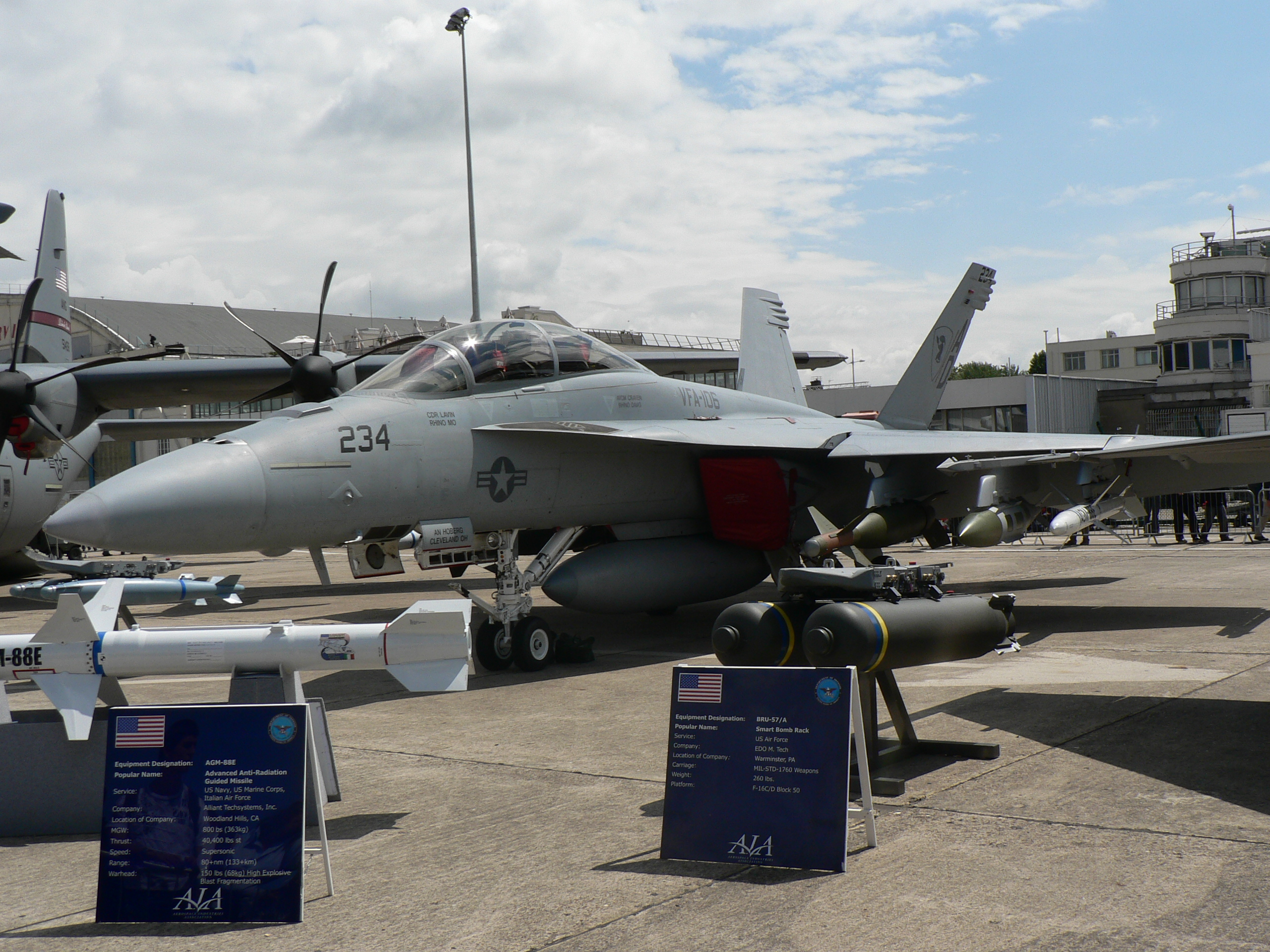
VFA-106 F/A-18F Super Hornet

There are approximately 1200 Navy and Marine Corps personnel, as well as foreign instructors and students (from countries such as the United Kingdom, Switzerland, and Germany) assigned to VFA-106. VFA-106 typically has 90+ F/A-18s of various models assigned. There is a permanent VFA-106 Detachment in Naval Air Station Key West, Florida, where the squadron often deploys for fighter training. The squadron often detaches 12 aircraft to Naval Air Station Fallon, Nevada and Naval Air Facility El Centro, California, as well as various aircraft carriers for carrier qualifications (CQ).

== Squadron insignia and nickname ==
The squadron’s insignia was approved by Chief of Naval Operations on 26 May 1982, and was similar to one used by VA-106 from April 1952 until disestablishment on 7 November 1969.

== Airshow TAC DEMO team ==
VFA-106 are also well known for the airshow TAC DEMO Team. The team flies the F/A-18C and F/A-18F to show sites in the eastern United States. Instructors of the squadron fly the aircraft, and serve on a year schedule. The team demonstrates maneuvers used in training and combat flights. VFA-122 takes the western part of the United States for demonstrations. Typically two F/A-18s are sent to the show site, one being the demonstration aircraft and the other being a spare in case the demo jet suffered a mechanical problem. The F/A-18F is often sent to air shows already featuring the US Navy's Blue Angels, while the F/A-18C, often referred to as the "Legacy Hornet" is usually featured at shows headlined by the USAF Thunderbirds. On 1 April 2013 the VFA-106 single ship demonstration teams schedule was canceled for the remainder of the year as a result of sequestration in Congress that cut US Military participation at all air shows around the country and it was not approved to return to the air show circuit in the 2014 season. On 20 and 21 September 2014, the F/A-18C and F/A-18F flew full tactical demonstrations both days of the NAS Oceana airshow marking the first time since 2012 that US Navy F/A-18s were displayed to the public. In early 2015 it was decided that VFA-106 would be participating in air shows once again, but in a more limited capacity with an estimated 20 demonstrations to only be flown at civilian show sites (with the exception of NAS Oceana), with both the F/A-18C and F/A-18F.

== History ==
VFA-106 was established at NAS Cecil Field, Florida on 27 April 1984, flying the F/A-18A/B Hornet. The first Replacement Pilot Class began training on the F/A-18 Hornet on 7 October 1985. In October and December 1987, respectively, VFA-106 received its first C and D models of the Hornet. In mid-1999, as a result of the BRAC-mandated closure of NAS Cecil Field, VFA-106 moved to NAS Oceana. In 2004, VFA-106 received its F/A-18E/F Super Hornets.

On 6 April 2012 an F/A-18D assigned to VFA-106 encountered problems on take off and crashed into an apartment complex in Virginia Beach, Virginia. Both pilots ejected safely, and there were no fatalities.

== See also ==
- VA-106 (U.S. Navy), "Gladiators" 1945–1969
- Naval aviation
- Modern US Navy carrier air operations
- United States Naval Aviator
- United States Marine Corps Aviation
- Military aviation
- List of United States Navy aircraft squadrons
- List of Inactive United States Navy aircraft squadrons
