= USS Wilkes-Barre =

Cleveland-class light cruiser

Coordinates: 24.6101°N 81.7630°W

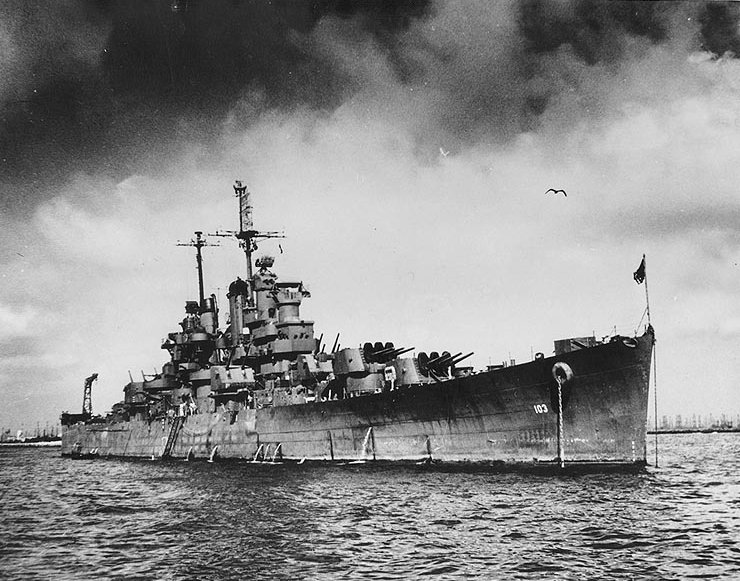
- USS Wilkes-Barre (circa January 1946)

History

United States
- Name: Wilkes-Barre
- Namesake: City of Wilkes-Barre, Pennsylvania
- Builder: New York Shipbuilding Corporation, Camden, New Jersey
- Laid down: 14 December 1942
- Launched: 24 December 1943
- Commissioned: 1 July 1944
- Decommissioned: 9 October 1947
- Stricken: 15 January 1971
- Fate: Sunk in testing 13 May 1972

General characteristics
- Class & type: Cleveland-class light cruiser
- Displacement: Standard: 11,744 long tons (11,932 t); Full load: 14,131 long tons (14,358 t)
- Length: 610 ft 1 in (185.95 m)
- Beam: 66 ft 4 in (20.22 m)
- Draft: 24 ft 6 in (7.47 m)
- Installed power: 4 × Babcock & Wilcox boilers; 100,000 shp (75,000 kW)
- Propulsion: 4 × steam turbines; 4 × screw propellers
- Speed: 32.5 knots (60.2 km/h; 37.4 mph)
- Range: 11,000 nmi (20,000 km; 13,000 mi) at 15 kn (28 km/h; 17 mph)
- Complement: 1,285 officers and enlisted
- Armament: 12 × 6 in (152 mm) Mark 16 guns; 12 × 5 in (127 mm)/38 caliber guns; 28 × 40 mm (1.6 in) Bofors anti-aircraft guns; 10 × 20 mm (0.79 in) Oerlikon anti-aircraft guns
- Armor: Belt: 3.5–5 in (89–127 mm); Deck: 2 in (51 mm); Barbettes: 6 in (152 mm); Turrets: 6 in (152 mm); Conning Tower: 5 in (127 mm)
- Aircraft carried: 4 × floatplanes
- Aviation facilities: 2 × stern catapults

USS Wilkes-Barre was a Cleveland-class light cruiser of the United States Navy, which were built during World War II. The class was designed as a development of the earlier Brooklyn-class cruisers, the size of which had been limited by the First London Naval Treaty. The start of the war led to the dissolution of the treaty system, but the dramatic need for new vessels precluded a new design, so the Clevelands used the same hull as their predecessors, but were significantly heavier. The Clevelands carried a main battery of twelve 6-inch (152 mm) guns in four three-gun turrets, along with a secondary armament of twelve 5 in (127 mm) dual-purpose guns. They had a top speed of 32.5 knots (60.2 km/h; 37.4 mph).

== Design ==
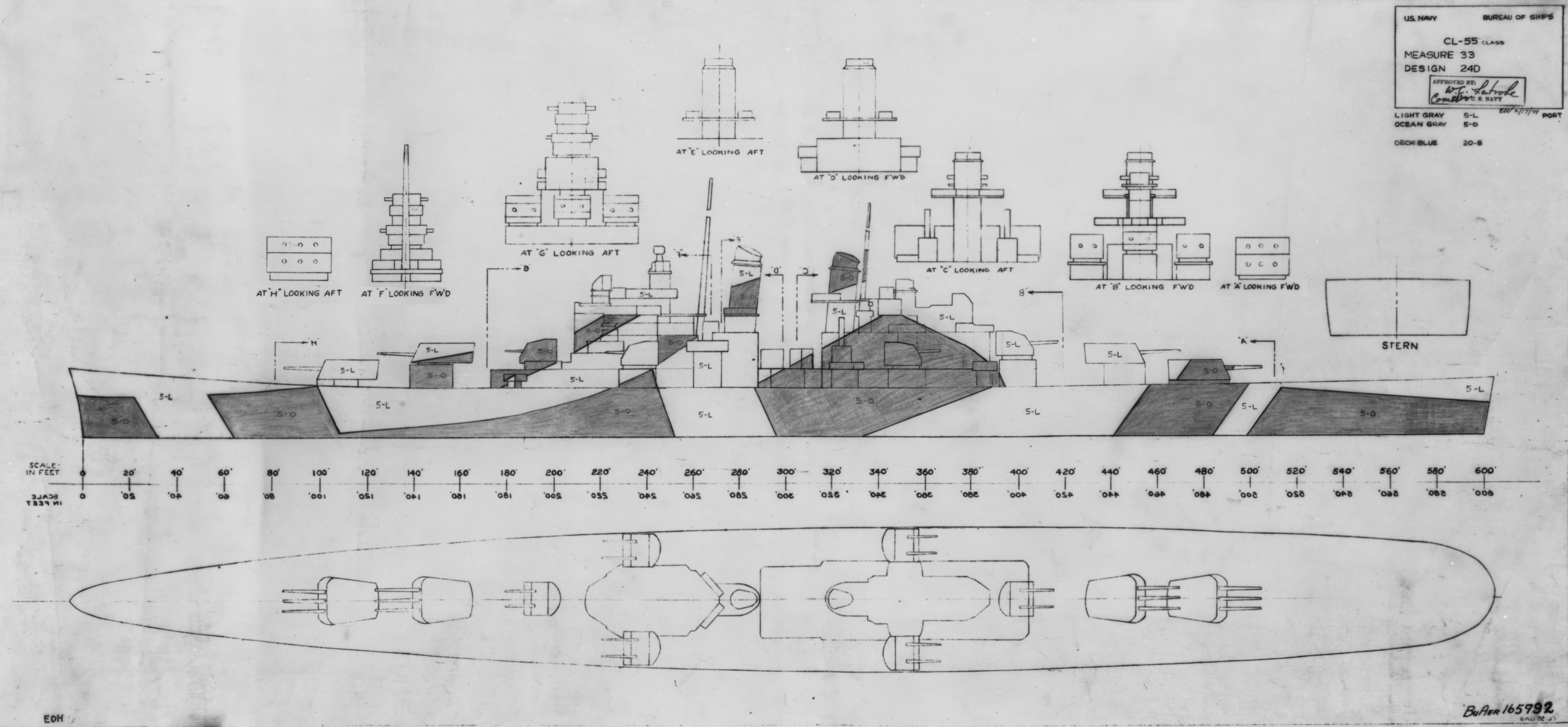
Depiction of the Cleveland class, showing the plan and profile

The Cleveland-class light cruisers traced their origin to design work done in the late 1930s; at the time, light cruiser displacement was limited to 8,000 long tons (8,100 t) by the Second London Naval Treaty. Following the start of World War II in September 1939, Britain announced it would suspend the treaty for the duration of the conflict, a decision the US Navy quickly followed. Though still neutral, the United States recognized that war was likely and the urgent need for additional ships ruled out an entirely new design, so the Clevelands were a close development of the earlier Brooklyn-class cruisers, the chief difference being the substitution of a two-gun 5 in (127 mm) dual-purpose gun mount for one of the main battery 6 in (152 mm) gun turrets.

Wilkes-Barre was 610 feet 1 inch (186 m) long overall and had a beam of 66 ft 4 in (20.22 m) and a draft of 24 ft 6 in (7.47 m). Her standard displacement amounted to 11,744 long tons (11,932 t) and increased to 14,131 long tons (14,358 t) at full load. The ship was powered by four General Electric steam turbines, each driving one propeller shaft, using steam provided by four oil-fired Babcock & Wilcox boilers. Rated at 100,000 shaft horsepower (75,000 kW), the turbines were intended to give a top speed of 32.5 knots (60.2 km/h; 37.4 mph). Her crew numbered 1285 officers and enlisted men.

The ship was armed with a main battery of twelve 6 in /47-caliber Mark 16 guns (Note: /47 refers to the length of the gun in terms of calibers. A /47 gun is 47 times long as it is in bore diameter.) in four 3-gun turrets on the centerline. Two were placed forward in a superfiring pair; the other two turrets were placed aft of the superstructure in another superfiring pair. The secondary battery consisted of twelve 5 in (127 mm) /38-caliber dual-purpose guns mounted in twin turrets. Two of these were placed on the centerline, one directly behind the forward main turrets and the other just forward of the aft turrets. Two more were placed abreast of the conning tower and the other pair on either side of the aft superstructure. Anti-aircraft defense consisted of twenty-eight Bofors 40 mm (1.6 in) guns in four quadruple and six double mounts and ten Oerlikon 20 mm (0.79 in) guns in single mounts.

The ship's belt armor ranged in thickness from 3.5 to 5 in (89 to 127 mm), with the thicker section amidships where it protected the ammunition magazines and propulsion machinery spaces. Her deck armor was 2 in (51 mm) thick. The main battery turrets were protected with 6.5 in (170 mm) faces and 3 in (76 mm) sides and tops, and they were supported by barbettes 6 inches thick. Wilkes-Barre's conning tower had 5-inch sides.

== Service history ==
The keel for Wilkes-Barre was laid down at New York Shipbuilding in Camden, New Jersey, on 14 December 1942. She was launched on 24 December 1943, and was commissioned on 1 July 1944 with the hull number CL-103. The ship embarked on her shakedown cruise, first in Chesapeake Bay, and later into the Atlantic, as far south as the Gulf of Paria in Trinidad in the British West Indies. After returning to Philadelphia, Wilkes-Barre departed on 23 October, bound for the Pacific. She passed through the Panama Canal four days later and then sailed north to San Diego, California, where she took on ammunition and other supplies. While there, she conducted shooting practice off San Clemente Island, and then got underway for Hawaii on 10 November. She arrived in Pearl Harbor, Hawaii, a week later and took part in training exercises in the area into early December.

=== South China Sea raid ===
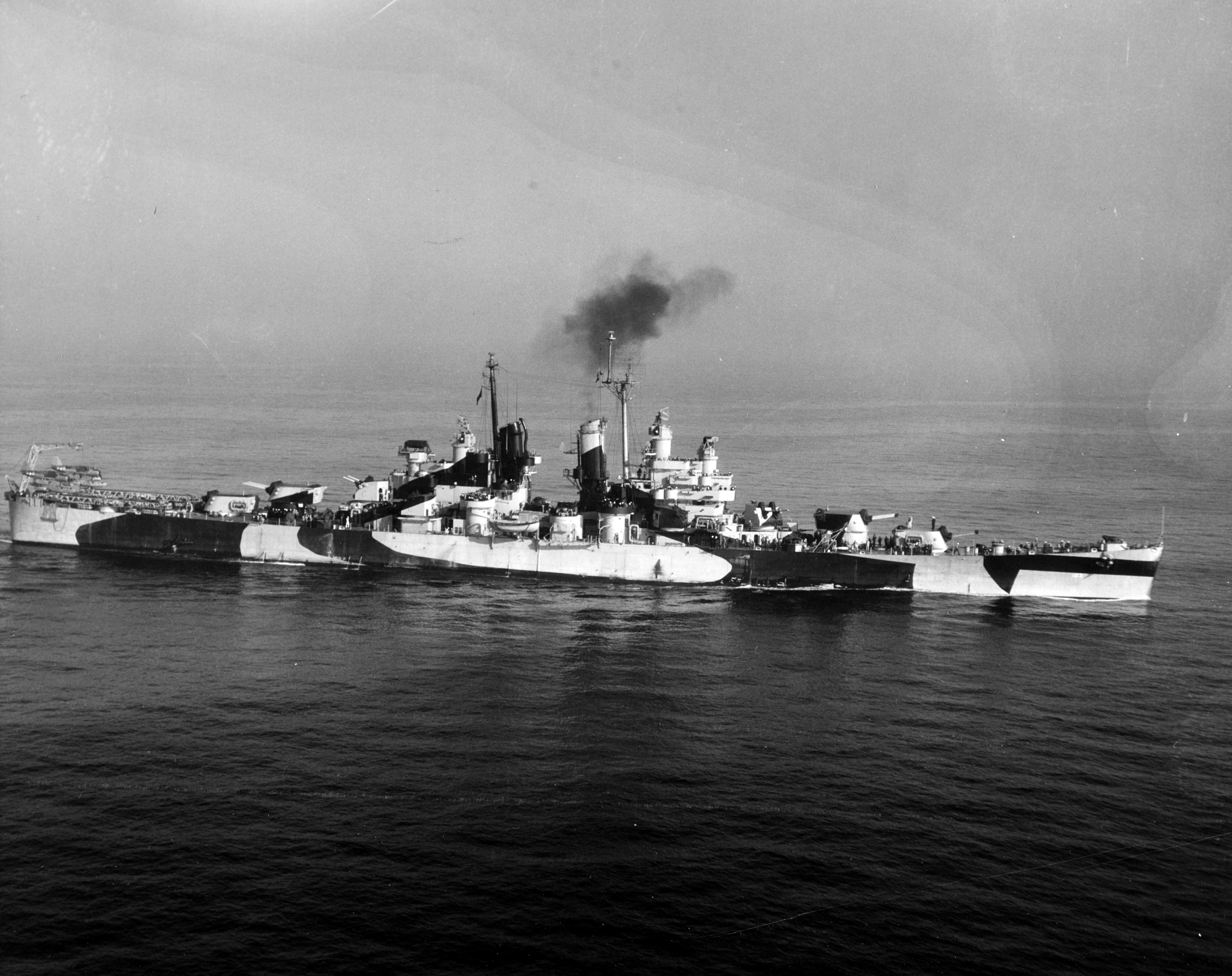
Wilkes-Barre underway in 1944

On 14 December, Wilkes-Barre left Pearl Harbor to join the rest of the American fleet, which was then at its forward anchorage at Ulithi in the Caroline Islands. On arrival, she was assigned to Cruiser Division 17, part of Task Force 38 (TF 38), otherwise known as the Fast Carrier Task Force, which was at that time assigned to 3rd Fleet. During this period, Wilkes-Barre was assigned to the subordinate unit Task Group 38.2, which was centered on the aircraft carriers Lexington, Hornet, and Hancock. The unit also included the fast battleships New Jersey and Wisconsin, three other cruisers, and twenty destroyers.

The fleet sortied on 30 December to conduct the South China Sea raid. The fleet's aircraft carriers launched a series of strikes against targets on Japanese-occupied Formosa and in the southern Ryuku Islands to neutralize Japanese airfields that might otherwise interfere with the imminent invasion of Luzon in the Philippines. The task force then turned to strike Japanese positions on Luzon itself. A further round of attacks on Formosa followed on 9 January 1945 and then moved to cover the flank of the force carrying out the invasion of Lingayen Gulf to block a possible attack by elements of the Japanese Navy.

Reports of Japanese warships off Cam Ranh Bay, French Indochina, on 12 January prompted the American command to detach Wilkes-Barre, the rest of Cruiser Division 17, New Jersey and Wisconsin, and escorting destroyers to form Task Group 34.5 (TG 34.5). They were sent to sweep for Japanese vessels, but the cruisers' floatplanes were unable to locate any, and the division returned to TF 38 later that day. Wilkes-Barre and the rest of the fleet encountered severe weather on 13 and 14 January, temporarily pausing offensive operations. The carriers resumed attacks along the coast of occupied China on 15 January, shifted to Formosa on 21 January, and concluded with a final round of attacks on Okinawa in the Ryukus the following day. TF 38 then returned to Ulithi, arriving there on 26 January for repairs and to replenish ammunition and stores. While there, command of the unit passed to 5th Fleet and it was accordingly renumbered Task Force 58.

=== Iwo Jima and Okinawa ===
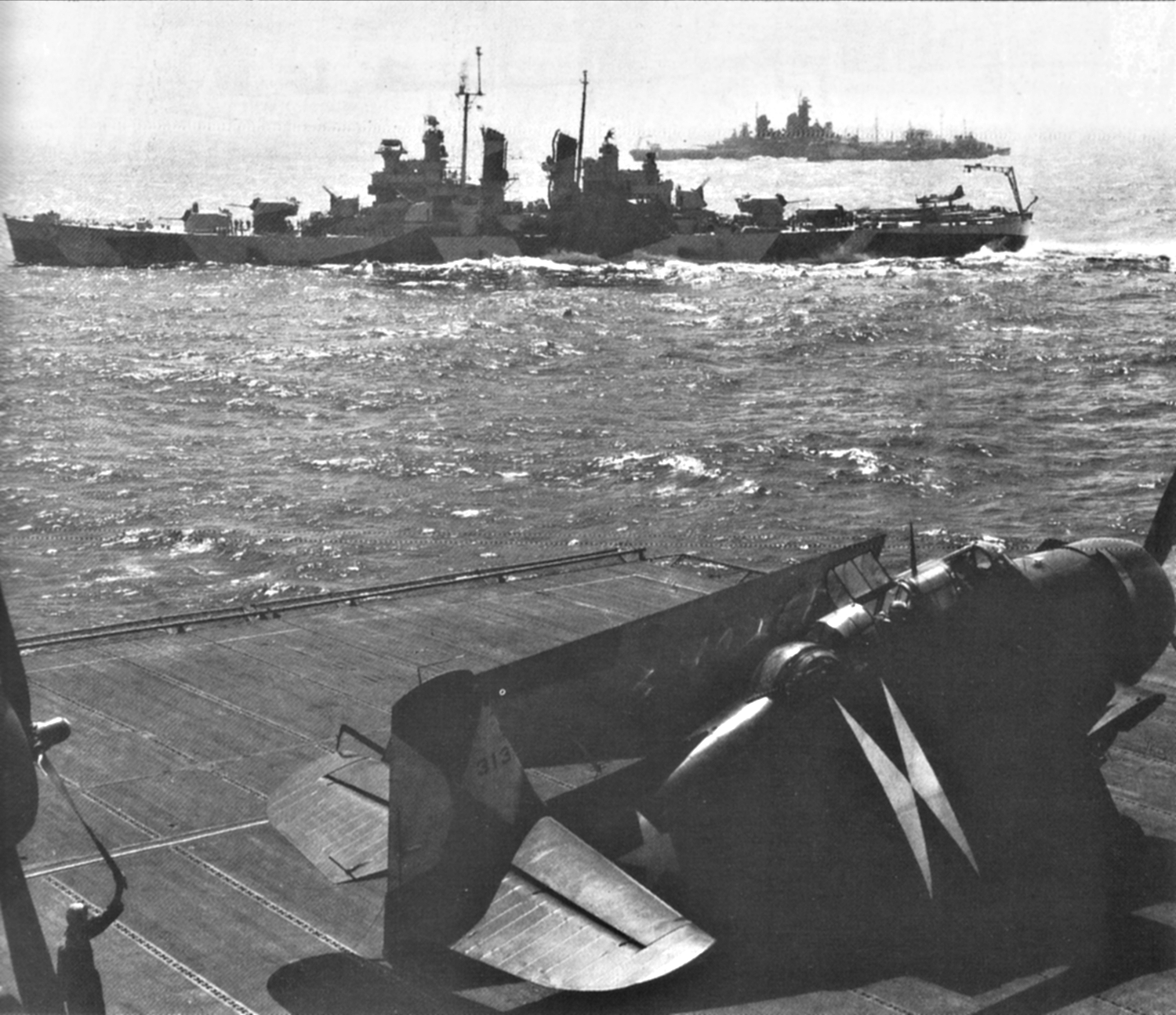
Wilkes-Barre off Okinawa

Wilkes-Barre and the rest of Cruiser Division 17 were transferred to TG 58.3, commanded by Rear Admiral Frederick C. Sherman. The unit also included the carriers Bunker Hill, Essex, and Cowpens, the battleships New Jersey and South Dakota, the large cruiser Alaska, two other cruisers, and fourteen destroyers. Over the course of operations during the next two months, the composition of the unit changed as vessels rotated out for repairs or maintenance. The fleet then sortied to carry out strikes on the Japanese capital, Tokyo, beginning on 16 February and lasting for two days. These attacks were intended to distract Japanese attention from the invasion of Iwo Jima. The fleet then sailed south to support the invasion directly, launching raids on the neighboring islands of Chichi Jima and Haha Jima while en route. On 19 February, the amphibious assault on Iwo Jima began. Wilkes-Barre was detached from the carrier screen two days later to provide gunfire support to the marines fighting ashore. The ship's fire was directed by her OS2U Kingfisher floatplanes, and she was credited with destroying numerous defensive positions and ammunition dumps. Her guns also broke up an attempted counterattack from the Japanese defenders.

The ship returned to her position in the carrier screen in TG 58.3 on 23 February before the fleet departed to carry out another round of attacks of Tokyo on 25 February, followed by a raid on Okinawa on 1 March. The ships then returned to Ulithi to refuel and take on additional ammunition and stores. The fleet remained there from 5 to 14 March Wilkes-Barre took part in training exercises with other elements of the fleet, designated Task Force 59, on 14 and 15 March, before returning to TG 58.3 later on the 15th. The fast carrier task force then sortied for an attack on Japan, which began on 18 March and targeted the southernmost island of Kyushu. The following day, Wilkes-Barre shot down a Yokosuka D4Y "Judy" dive bomber. The Japanese nevertheless scored a pair of hits on the carrier Franklin, inflicting serious damage and forcing TG 58.3 to temporarily disengage to cover the crippled Franklin as she withdrew.

TG 58.3 resumed strikes on 23 March, targeting Okinawa through the next day to prepare for the upcoming invasion of Okinawa. Wilkes-Barre launched one of her Kingfishers to rescue two pilots who had been shot down off Minami Daito Shima on the 24th. Wilkes-Barre and the rest of Cruiser Division 17 bombarded a Japanese airfield on Minami Daito Shima on 27 March. Two days later, the fleet turned back north for additional strikes on Kyushu. Wilkes-Barre launched one of her Kingfishers to recover another pair of pilots from the carrier Bunker Hill who had been shot down off Yakushima during the attacks. American forces began to go ashore on Okinawa on 1 April, and TF 58 continued to support the operation, carrying out strikes on Japanese airfields in the region, including on Kyushu, Shikoku, and southern Honshu. The Japanese launched heavy air attacks in response, with a particular emphasis on kamikaze tactics. On 11 April, Wilkes-Barre's anti-aircraft gunners claimed three Mitsubishi A6M Zero fighters and an Aichi D3A "Val" dive bomber, along with partial credit for a further two Zeroes.

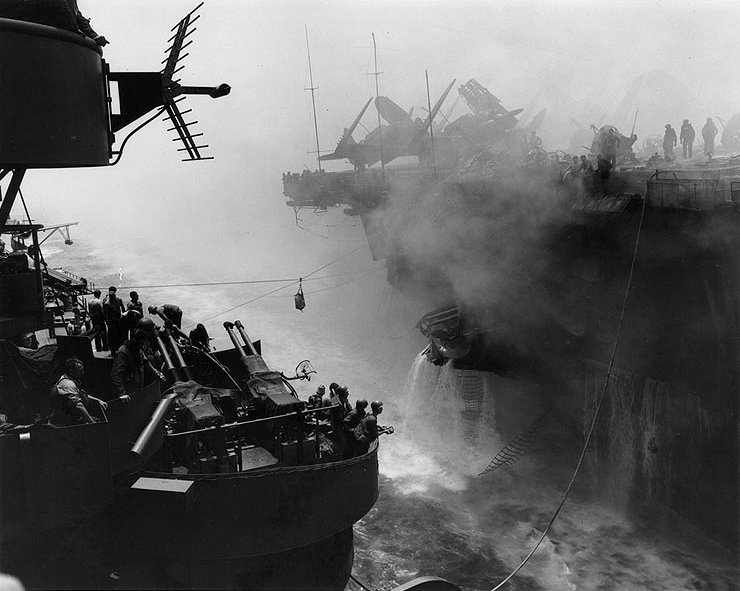
Transfer of wounded from USS Bunker Hill to Wilkes-Barre

On 16 April, TF 58 embarked on another series of attacks on Japanese airfields on Kyushu. Late that day, at around 18:54, Wilkes-Barre's gunners shot down a Japanese bomber that attempted to attack the American carriers. The next morning, she shot down a Zero at 09:39. During the operations off Okinawa and southern Japan, Wilkes-Barre continued to employer her Kingfishers to rescue downed air crews, including a pair of pilots off Okinawa on 26 April. Further strikes on Japan were carried out over the first ten days on May, and on the 10th, Wilkes-Barre and the rest of Cruiser Division 17 were detached to form Task Group 58.3 along with a group of escorting destroyers to bombard Minami Daito Shima again. The ships returned to TF 58 the next day; the fleet was attacked by kamikazes that morning, and two of them struck Bunker Hill, inflicting serious damage. Wilkes-Barre was ordered to come alongside at 10:59 and assist with firefighting efforts. The cruiser placed her bow in contact with Bunker Hills starboard quarter so some forty men, who were trapped by fires, could climb to safety aboard Wilkes-Barre. The ship sent additional firefighting equipment aboard the carrier and took off injured men, and by 15:34, the fires had been extinguished, allowing Wilkes-Barre to pull away.

Thirteen men from Bunker Hill had died by 12 May, so a burial at sea was held that day; the remaining survivors were transferred to the hospital ship Bountiful. Later on the 12th, TF 58 got underway to launch another round of strikes on the Kyushu airfields to further degrade the Japanese ability to interfere with the Okinawa invasion fleet. The raid began the following morning, and on 14 May, the Japanese launched an aerial counterattack. During the action, shell fragments, possibly from American guns, struck Wilkes-Barre and wounded nine men on the aft signal bridge. For their part, the ship's gunners claimed partial credit for shooting down a Zero at 08:16. On 28 May, 3rd Fleet resumed command of the fast carrier task force, and Wilkes-Barre's unit was accordingly re-numbered TG 38.3. Wilkes-Barre was detached from the unit the next day to return to the Philippines for repairs and maintenance at San Pedro Bay that lasted from 1 to 20 June. Over the following three days, she took part in shooting practice and tactical training off Samar. She remained in the bay for the rest of the month.

=== End of the war and occupation ===
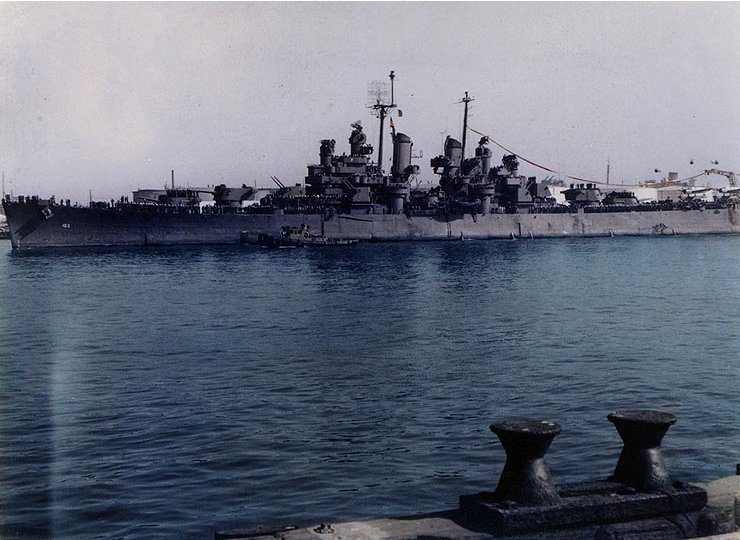
Wilkes-Barre in San Pedro, California, in 1946

Wilkes-Barre thereafter rejoined TF 38, again part of TG 38.3, which sortied on 1 July to begin the last major campaign of air strikes on Japan. The next week consisted of combat training exercises, and the first attacks on targets on Honshu and Hokkaido began on 10 July. On the 14th, Wilkes-Barre and several other vessels were detached to create Task Group 35.1; the unit also included Pasadena, Astoria, and Springfield and six destroyers. They were sent to carry out a sweep for Japanese vessels off northern Honshu and in the Kii Channel, but they failed to locate any targets. Wilkes-Barre was again detached to join the bombardment force TG 35.3 on 24 July, along with Astoria, Pasadena, and Springfield. The ships shelled the seaplane base at Kushimoto that evening and later bombarded Cape Shionomisaki. Further carrier strikes were conducted in late July, but bad weather forced the fleet to temporarily withdraw in early August. The fleet returned to the Japanese coast on 8 August and resumed air attacks on the 9th and 10th, by which time both atomic bombs had been dropped on Hiroshima and Nagasaki. By 15 August, the Japanese government had agreed to surrender, ending the war. For her service during the conflict, Wilkes-Barre received four battle stars.

The ships of Cruiser Division 17 were detached from TG 38.3 on 23 August. Four days later, they joined the fleet that steamed into Sagami Bay, which lays outside Tokyo Bay, where the surrender ceremony was to take place on 2 September. On the 3rd, Wilkes-Barre entered Tokyo Bay as preparations for the occupation of Japan began. The vessel was designated the flagship of Task Unit 35.7.2., one of the occupation groups, which was assigned the task of occupying the naval base at Tateyama. There, midget submarines and Shinyo kamikaze boats were seized on 10 September. Wilkes-Barre then returned to Tokyo, laying in Sagami Bay from 12 to 14 September to supervise the demilitarization of midget submarine bases at Aburatsubo and Kurihama. After refueling in Tokyo Bay later on the 14th, the cruiser sailed for Onagawa, where she assisted occupation forces from 15 to 17 September. She thereafter moved to Katsuura and returned to Tokyo on 24 September.

Wilkes-Barre anchored off Tokyo from 24 September to 4 October, and thereafter took part in training maneuvers from 24 to 28 October. By that time, 5th Fleet had resumed control of the American fleet in Japan. Wilkes-Barre was detached on 5 November and sent to formerly-Japanese-controlled Korea on the 9th; she arrived at Inchon on 13 November. There, she joined the destroyers Hart and Bell, which sailed together to Qingdao, China, which had also been under Japanese occupation. The ships oversaw the demilitarization of Japanese forces there until 19 November, before shifting to Taku and Qinhuangdao, China, for the same duty. Wilkes-Barre later returned to Qingdao and remained there through the end of the year.

=== Postwar career and fate ===
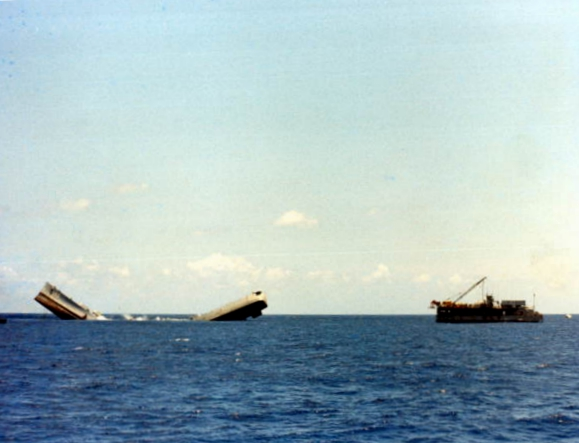
Wilkes-Barre sinking off Key West, 12 May 1972

On 13 January 1946, Wilkes-Barre departed Qingdao, bound for the United States. She stopped in Pearl Harbor on the way to the West Coast of the United States, finally arriving in San Pedro, California, on 31 January. She remained there only briefly, before getting underway on 4 March to move to the East Coast of the United States. After passing through the Panama Canal between 12 and 14 March, the ship arrived in Philadelphia on 18 March. On 20 October, she sailed south to participate in the Navy Day celebrations in New Orleans on 27 October. Wilkes-Barre thereafter steamed to Guantanamo Bay, Cuba, where she joined her sister ships Dayton and Providence for training exercises. On 13 December, the ship arrived in Norfolk, Virginia.

Wilkes-Barre embarked on a goodwill cruise to northern Europe on 17 February 1947. She stopped in Plymouth in the United Kingdom on 27 February and cruised in British waters over the course of March and April, during which time she sailed to Bergen, Norway. She thereafter returned to the United States, where she was assigned to the United States Reserve Fleet. She was decommissioned on 9 October and assigned to the reserve fleet based in Philadelphia. She remained there until she was struck from the naval register on 15 January 1971; she was the last light cruiser in the Navy's inventory. The ship was allocated for disposal in underwater weapons tests. During one such test off the Florida Keys on 12 May 1972, the old cruiser's hull broke in half. The stern section sank that day, but the bow remained afloat until it was sunk with a scuttling charge the following day.

The two sections of Wilkes-Barre have developed into artificial reefs, and are a popular deep wreck diving site. The wreck sits upright on the ocean floor at a depth of 320 feet (98 m), and the upper deck rests at a depth of about 210 feet (64 m), but the highest point of the wreck is at 140 feet (43 m). According to the diver and author Steven Singer, the site is suitable only for experienced divers.
