= USS Astoria (CL-90) =

Light cruiser of the United States Navy

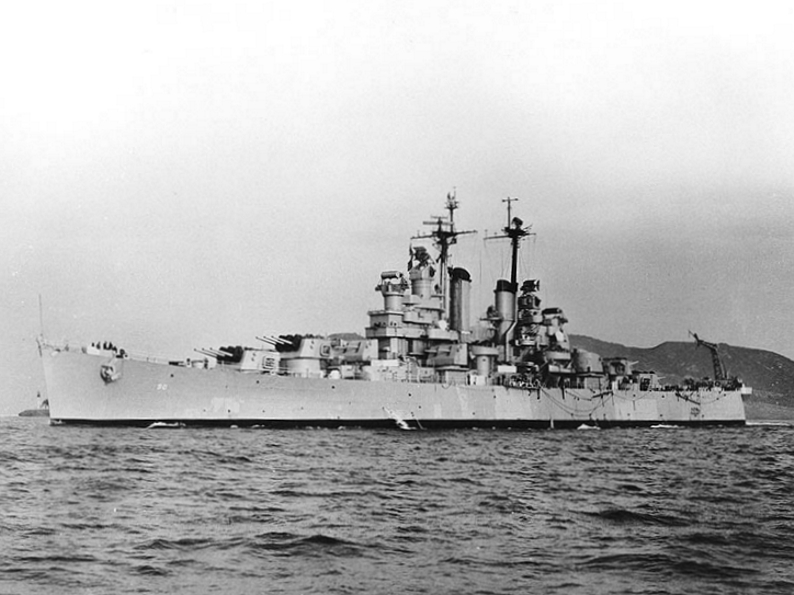
- USS Astoria (CL-90), circa 1947.

History

United States
- Name: Astoria
- Namesake: City of Astoria, Oregon
- Builder: Cramp Shipbuilding Co., Philadelphia
- Laid down: 6 September 1941
- Launched: 6 March 1943
- Commissioned: 17 May 1944
- Decommissioned: 1 July 1949
- Stricken: 1 November 1969
- Fate: Sold for scrap 12 January 1971

General characteristics
- Class & type: Cleveland-class light cruiser
- Displacement: Standard: 11,744 long tons (11,932 t); Full load: 14,131 long tons (14,358 t)
- Length: 610 ft 1 in (185.95 m)
- Beam: 66 ft 4 in (20.22 m)
- Draft: 24 ft 6 in (7.47 m)
- Installed power: 4 × Babcock & Wilcox boilers; 100,000 shp (75,000 kW)
- Propulsion: 4 × steam turbines; 4 × screw propellers
- Speed: 32.5 knots (60.2 km/h; 37.4 mph)
- Range: 11,000 nmi (20,000 km; 13,000 mi) at 15 kn (28 km/h; 17 mph)
- Complement: 1,285 officers and enlisted
- Armament: 12 × 6 in (152 mm) Mark 16 guns; 12 × 5 in (127 mm)/38 caliber guns; 28 × 40 mm (1.6 in) Bofors anti-aircraft guns; 10 × 20 mm (0.79 in) Oerlikon anti-aircraft guns
- Armor: Belt: 3.5–5 in (89–127 mm); Deck: 2 in (51 mm); Barbettes: 6 in (152 mm); Turrets: 6 in (152 mm); Conning Tower: 5 in (127 mm)
- Aircraft carried: 4 × floatplanes
- Aviation facilities: 2 × stern catapults

The third USS Astoria (hull number: CL-90) was a Cleveland-class light cruiser of the United States Navy, which were built during World War II. The class was designed as a development of the earlier Brooklyn-class cruisers, the size of which had been limited by the First London Naval Treaty. The start of the war led to the dissolution of the treaty system, but the dramatic need for new vessels precluded a new design, so the Clevelands used the same hull as their predecessors, but were significantly heavier. The Clevelands carried a main battery of twelve 6-inch (152 mm) guns in four three-gun turrets, along with a secondary armament of twelve 5 in (127 mm) dual-purpose guns. They had a top speed of 32.5 knots (60.2 km/h; 37.4 mph).

The ship was laid down on 6 September 1941 at William Cramp & Sons Shipbuilding Company, Philadelphia, as Wilkes-Barre. It was subsequently renamed to Astoria in honor of the heavy cruiser Astoria (CA-34) which was sunk on 9 August 1942 during the Battle of Savo Island. Astoria was launched on 6 March 1943, sponsored by Mrs. Robert Lucas (wife of the editor of the Astorian-Budget), and commissioned at the Philadelphia Navy Yard on 17 May 1944.

== Design ==
The Cleveland-class light cruisers traced their origin to design work done in the late 1930s; at the time, light cruiser displacement was limited to 8,000 long tons (8,100 t) by the Second London Naval Treaty. Following the start of World War II in September 1939, Britain announced it would suspend the treaty for the duration of the conflict, a decision the US Navy quickly followed. Though still neutral, the United States recognized that war was likely and the urgent need for additional ships ruled out an entirely new design, so the Clevelands were a close development of the earlier Brooklyn-class cruisers, the chief difference being the substitution of a two-gun 5 in (127 mm) dual-purpose gun mount for one of the main battery 6 in (152 mm) gun turrets.

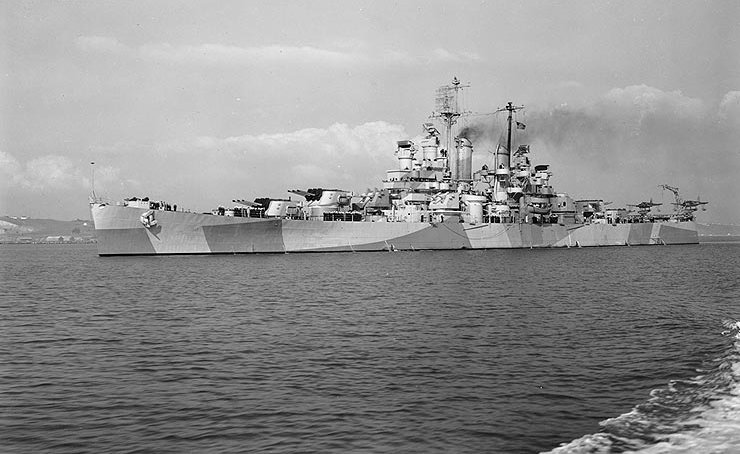
Astoria at the Mare Island Navy Yard in October 1944

Astoria was 610 feet 1 inch (186 m) long overall and had a beam of 66 ft 4 in (20.22 m) and a draft of 24 ft 6 in (7.47 m). Her standard displacement amounted to 11,744 long tons (11,932 t) and increased to 14,131 long tons (14,358 t) at full load. The ship was powered by four General Electric steam turbines, each driving one propeller shaft, using steam provided by four oil-fired Babcock & Wilcox boilers. Rated at 100,000 shaft horsepower (75,000 kW), the turbines were intended to give a top speed of 32.5 knots (60.2 km/h; 37.4 mph). Her crew numbered 1285 officers and enlisted men.

The ship was armed with a main battery of twelve 6 in /47-caliber Mark 16 guns (Note: /47 refers to the length of the gun in terms of calibers. A /47 gun is 47 times long as it is in bore diameter.) in four 3-gun turrets on the centerline. Two were placed forward in a superfiring pair; the other two turrets were placed aft of the superstructure in another superfiring pair. The secondary battery consisted of twelve 5 in (127 mm) /38-caliber dual-purpose guns mounted in twin turrets. Two of these were placed on the centerline, one directly behind the forward main turrets and the other just forward of the aft turrets. Two more were placed abreast of the conning tower and the other pair on either side of the aft superstructure. Anti-aircraft defense consisted of twenty-eight Bofors 40 mm (1.6 in) guns in four quadruple and six double mounts and ten Oerlikon 20 mm (0.79 in) guns in single mounts.

The ship's belt armor ranged in thickness from 3.5 to 5 in (89 to 127 mm), with the thicker section amidships where it protected the ammunition magazines and propulsion machinery spaces. Her deck armor was 2 in (51 mm) thick. The main battery turrets were protected with 6.5 in (170 mm) faces and 3 in (76 mm) sides and tops, and they were supported by barbettes 6 inches thick. Astoria's conning tower had 5-inch sides.

== Service history ==
=== Construction and early service ===
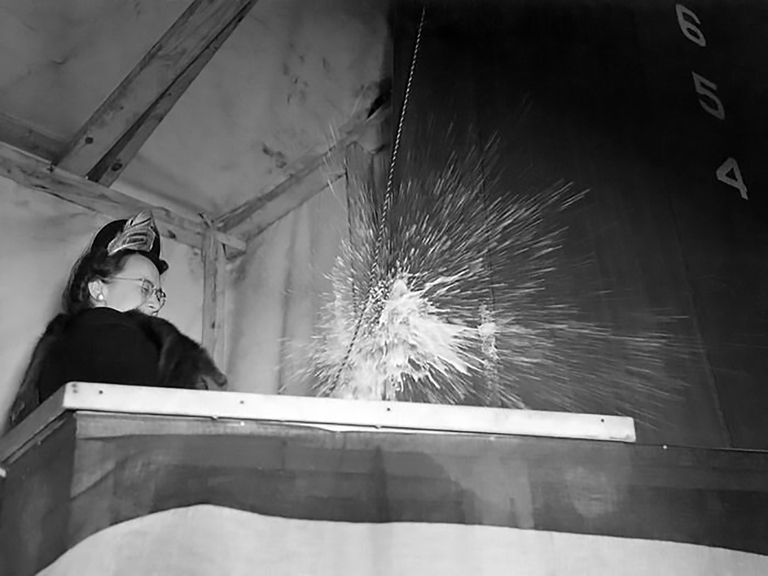
Peggy Lucas breaks a champagne bottle on the USS Astoria (CL-90) on March 6, 1943 at Cramp Shipbuilding Company, Philadelphia.

Astoria was laid down at the Cramp Shipbuilding shipyard in Philadelphia on 6 September 1941 and was launched on 6 March 1943. She was originally named Wilkes-Barre, but during construction, she was renamed Astoria for Astoria, Oregon, with the hull number CL-90. After completing fitting-out, she was commissioned for active service on 17 May 1944. The ship thereafter embarked on her shakedown cruise along the western Atlantic, as far south as Bermuda, which lasted from 6 June to 23 July. She then returned to Philadelphia for an overhaul before departing to join the Pacific Fleet on 19 September. She passed through the Panama Canal and arrived in San Diego, California, on 3 October. Astoria later moved to the Mare Island Navy Yard before sailing for Pearl Harbor on 25 October. She arrived five days later and remained there through 16 November.

=== World War II ===
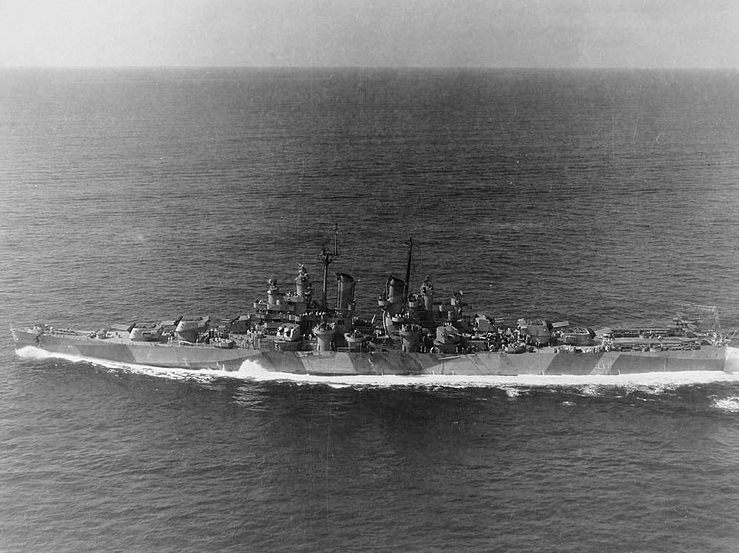
Astoria underway during her shakedown cruise on 22 July

On 16 November, Astoria left Pearl Harbor to join Task Force 38, the fast carrier task force, which was at that time based in Ulithi in the western Caroline Islands. She stopped in Eniwetok in the Marshall Islands while en route and reached Ulithi on 25 November. After arriving, she was assigned to Task Group 38.2, one of the carrier battle groups that formed TF 38. At that time, the unit also included the aircraft carriers Lexington, Hancock, Hornet, Independence, and Cabot, the fast battleships New Jersey, Iowa, and Wisconsin, the light cruisers Pasadena, Vincennes, Miami, and San Juan, and twenty destroyers. Astoria was assigned the role of anti-aircraft escort for the fleet's aircraft carriers. The American fleet sortied on 11 December to support the invasion of Mindoro; the carriers conducted a series of raids from 14 to 16 December before poor weather on the 17th grounded the aircraft. That night, Typhoon Cobra struck the fleet and inflicted significant damage to a number of ships, sinking three destroyers, though Astoria was not seriously damaged. The fleet searched for two days for survivors from the destroyers that sank before returning to Ulithi.

TF 38 sortied from Ulithi again on 30 December to cover the invasion of Luzon, striking Japanese positions on the islands from 6 to 9 January 1945. By this time, TG 38.2 had been reduced to Lexington, Hancock, and Hornet, covered by New Jersey, Wisconsin, Astoria, Pasadena, San Juan, the cruiser Wilkes-Barre, and fifteen destroyers. Late on the 9th, the fleet began the South China Sea raid to attack Japanese holdings in China and Southeast Asia. Astoria escorted the carriers over the next two weeks as they struck various targets in Japanese occupied China, including Hong Kong, Guangzhou, Hainan, and Formosa, and French Indochina, including the naval base at Cam Ranh Bay. The fleet returned to Ulithi on 25 January.

By early February, command of the fast carrier task force had passed to 5th Fleet, and so the unit was re-numbered TF 58. At that time, Astoria, Wilkes-Barre, and Pasadena were transferred to TG 58.3, which included Cabot, the carriers Bunker Hill and Essex, the battleships South Dakota and New Jersey, the large cruiser Alaska, and fourteen destroyers. The fleet, including Astoria, sortied early that month to conduct a series of air attacks on the Japanese home islands, which began on 18 February. Later that day, the fleet sailed south to support the invasion of Iwo Jima, and Astoria was detached to conduct shore bombardment on 21 February. She thereafter rejoined the carriers for another round of strikes on the Japanese capital, Tokyo, and thereafter returned to Ulithi on 3 March. TF 58 got underway again on 14 March to begin air strikes to prepare for the upcoming invasion of Okinawa. Astoria once again served in the anti-aircraft screen for the carriers of TG 58.3 during these operations. Over the course of the next three months of sustained combat, Astoria's gunners claimed credit for eleven Japanese aircraft and partial credit for several others. Astoria returned to Leyte in the Philippines on 1 June for periodic maintenance that lasted for a month.

On 1 July, she sailed to return to the fast carrier task force for another major operation against the Japanese home islands. By that time, Third Fleet had resumed control of the force, so unit to which Astoria returned had reverted to the designation TG 38.3. During this period, she served in Cruiser Division 17, and she was twice detached to conduct patrols for Japanese vessels off Honshu. These were carried out on 17–18 and 24–25 July. For the first of these, Astoria joined Pasadena, Wilkes-Barre, and their sister ship Springfield, along with six destroyers, to create Task Group 35.1. They were sent to carry out a sweep for Japanese vessels off northern Honshu and in the Kii Channel, but they failed to locate any targets. For the latter operation, Astoria was again detached to join the bombardment force TG 35.3 on 24 July, along with Wilkes-Barre, Pasadena, and Springfield. The ships shelled the seaplane base at Kushimoto that evening and later bombarded Cape Shionomisaki. TF 38's operations off Japan continued through the end of July and into the first two weeks of August. On 15 August, Japan agreed to surrender and TF 38 ceased offensive operations, though the fleet continued to patrol off the coast of Japan. Astoria remained with the fleet until 3 September, when she received orders to return home. For her wartime service, Astoria received five battle stars.

=== Post war ===
Astoria reached San Pedro, California, on 15 September, anchoring there until she departed to return to Pearl Harbor on 24 November. Arriving there six days later, she took part in training exercises over the following days. She left to return to San Pedro on 10 December, arriving five days later. Over the course of the following ten months, the ship cruised along the western coast of North America, as far north as Vancouver, British Columbia, and as far south as San Diego. The ship got underway for a lengthy voyage to the central Pacific on 15 October 1946, which included stops in Guam and Saipan in the Marianas Islands. On 17 February 1947, she left Guam to return home by way of Kwajalein and Pearl Harbor, arriving in San Diego on 24 March. She resumed her peacetime cruises along the west coast through September 1948.

The ship departed for another overseas cruise on 1 October, this time headed to East Asian waters. She stopped in Pearl Harbor for three days while en route and then resumed her voyage across the Pacific, arriving in Qingdao, China, on 29 October. Astoria visited a number of ports in the area over the next three and a half months, including Inchon and Pusan in Korea, Sasebo and Yokosuka in Japan, and Shanghai, China. The ship left Yokosuka on 16 February 1949, bound for the United States. She stopped in Pearl Harbor on the way and arrived in San Francisco on 8 March. While there on 1 July, Astoria was decommissioned and assigned to the San Francisco Group, Pacific Reserve Fleet. She remained in the Navy's inventory until 1 November 1969, when she was struck from the naval register. She was sold for scrap to the Nicolai Joffe Corp. on 12 January 1971 and subsequently broken up.
