= USS Portsmouth (CL-102) =

Light cruiser of the United States Navy

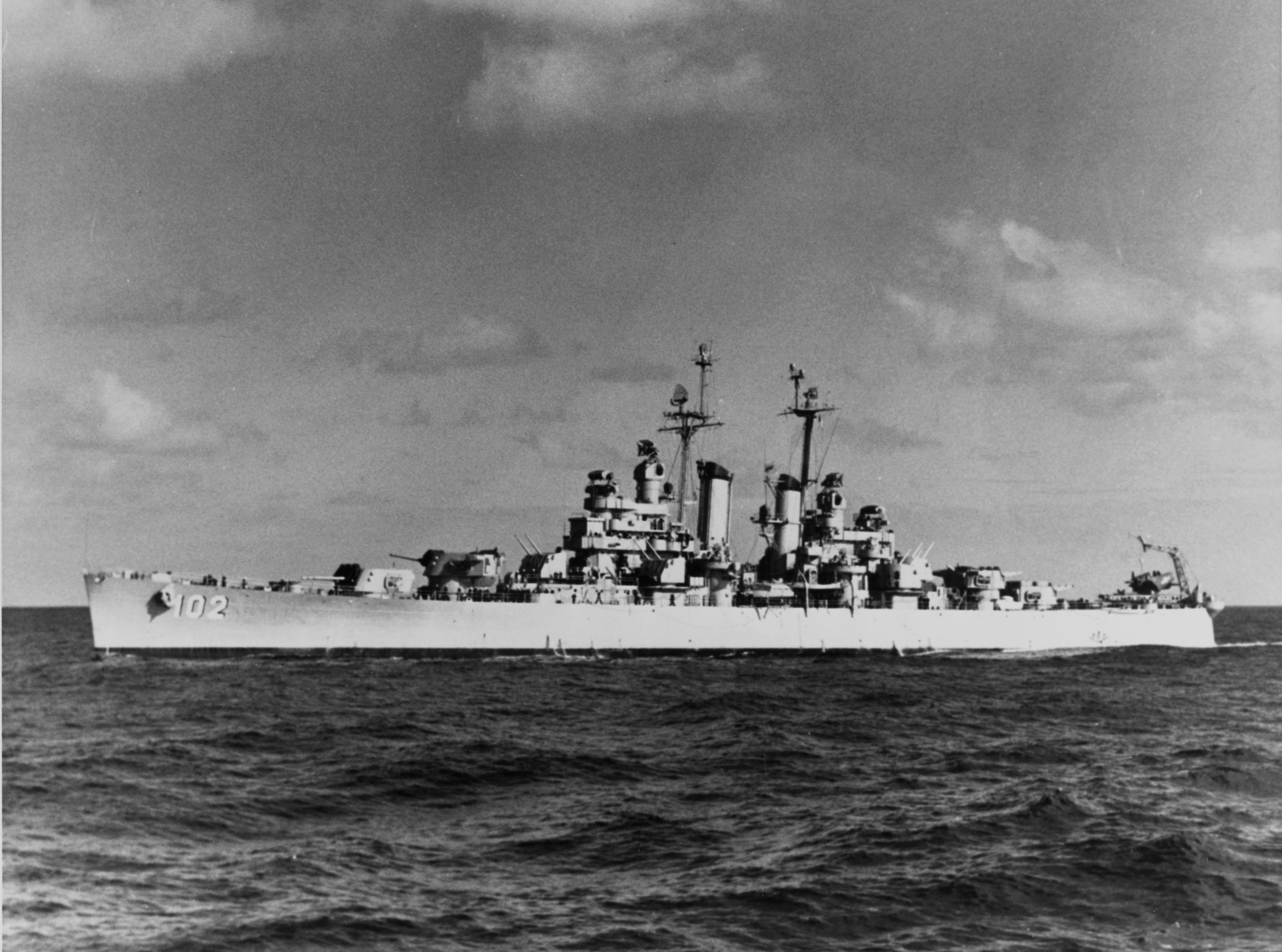
- USS Portsmouth (April 1948)

History

United States
- Name: Portsmouth
- Namesake: City of Portsmouth, New Hampshire
- Builder: Newport News Shipbuilding & Dry Dock Company, Newport News, Virginia
- Laid down: 28 June 1943
- Launched: 20 September 1944
- Commissioned: 25 June 1945
- Decommissioned: 15 June 1949
- Stricken: 15 January 1971
- Fate: Sold for scrap on 26 February 1974

General characteristics
- Class & type: Cleveland-class light cruiser
- Displacement: Standard: 11,744 long tons (11,932 t); Full load: 14,131 long tons (14,358 t)
- Length: 610 ft 1 in (185.95 m)
- Beam: 66 ft 4 in (20.22 m)
- Draft: 24 ft 6 in (7.47 m)
- Installed power: 4 × Babcock & Wilcox boilers; 100,000 shp (75,000 kW)
- Propulsion: 4 × steam turbines; 4 × screw propellers
- Speed: 32.5 knots (60.2 km/h; 37.4 mph)
- Range: 11,000 nmi (20,000 km; 13,000 mi) at 15 kn (28 km/h; 17 mph)
- Complement: 1,285 officers and enlisted
- Armament: 12 × 6 in (152 mm) Mark 16 guns; 12 × 5 in (127 mm)/38 caliber guns; 28 × 40 mm (1.6 in) Bofors anti-aircraft guns; 10 × 20 mm (0.79 in) Oerlikon anti-aircraft guns
- Armor: Belt: 3.5–5 in (89–127 mm); Deck: 2 in (51 mm); Barbettes: 6 in (152 mm); Turrets: 6 in (152 mm); Conning Tower: 5 in (127 mm)
- Aircraft carried: 4 × floatplanes
- Aviation facilities: 2 × stern catapults

USS Portsmouth (hull number: CL-102) was a Cleveland-class light cruiser of the United States Navy, which were built during World War II. The class was designed as a development of the earlier Brooklyn-class cruisers, the size of which had been limited by the First London Naval Treaty. The start of the war led to the dissolution of the treaty system, but the dramatic need for new vessels precluded a new design, so the Clevelands used the same hull as their predecessors, but were significantly heavier. The Clevelands carried a main battery of twelve 6-inch (152 mm) guns in four three-gun turrets, along with a secondary armament of twelve 5 in (127 mm) dual-purpose guns. They had a top speed of 32.5 knots (60.2 km/h; 37.4 mph). Portsmouth was laid down in 1943, launched in September 1944, and commissioned in June 1945. By the time she completed her initial sea trials, the war had ended, so her career was short and uneventful. She made three overseas cruises to visit ports in Africa and the Mediterranean Sea between 1946 and 1948 before conducting training cruises later in 1948. The following year, she was decommissioned and assigned to the Atlantic Reserve Fleet, where she remained until 1970, when she was broken up.

== Design ==
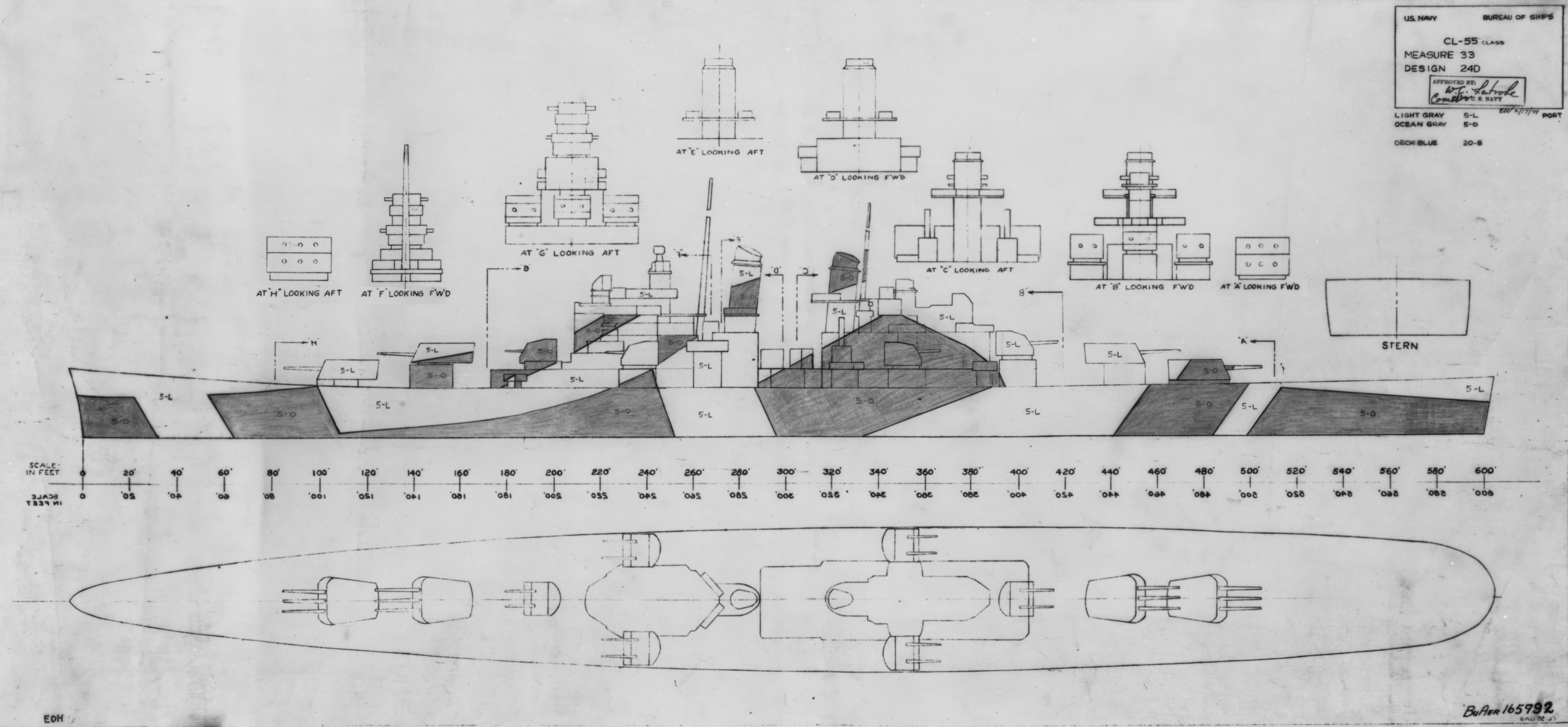
Depiction of the Cleveland class, showing the plan and profile

The Cleveland-class light cruisers traced their origin to design work done in the late 1930s; at the time, light cruiser displacement was limited to 8,000 long tons (8,100 t) by the Second London Naval Treaty. Following the start of World War II in September 1939, Britain announced it would suspend the treaty for the duration of the conflict, a decision the US Navy quickly followed. Though still neutral, the United States recognized that war was likely and the urgent need for additional ships ruled out an entirely new design, so the Clevelands were a close development of the earlier Brooklyn-class cruisers, the chief difference being the substitution of a two-gun 5 in (127 mm) dual-purpose gun mount for one of the main battery 6 in (152 mm) gun turrets.

Portsmouth was 610 feet 1 inch (186 m) long overall and had a beam of 66 ft 4 in (20.22 m) and a draft of 24 ft 6 in (7.47 m). Her standard displacement amounted to 11,744 long tons (11,932 t) and increased to 14,131 long tons (14,358 t) at full load. The ship was powered by four General Electric steam turbines, each driving one propeller shaft, using steam provided by four oil-fired Babcock & Wilcox boilers. Rated at 100,000 shaft horsepower (75,000 kW), the turbines were intended to give a top speed of 32.5 knots (60.2 km/h; 37.4 mph). Her crew numbered 1285 officers and enlisted men.

The ship was armed with a main battery of twelve 6 in /47-caliber Mark 16 guns (Note: /47 refers to the length of the gun in terms of calibers. A /47 gun is 47 times long as it is in bore diameter.) in four 3-gun turrets on the centerline. Two were placed forward in a superfiring pair; the other two turrets were placed aft of the superstructure in another superfiring pair. The secondary battery consisted of twelve 5 in (127 mm) /38-caliber dual-purpose guns mounted in twin turrets. Two of these were placed on the centerline, one directly behind the forward main turrets and the other just forward of the aft turrets. Two more were placed abreast of the conning tower and the other pair on either side of the aft superstructure. Anti-aircraft defense consisted of twenty-eight Bofors 40 mm (1.6 in) guns in four quadruple and six double mounts and ten Oerlikon 20 mm (0.79 in) guns in single mounts.

The ship's belt armor ranged in thickness from 3.5 to 5 in (89 to 127 mm), with the thicker section amidships where it protected the ammunition magazines and propulsion machinery spaces. Her deck armor was 2 in (51 mm) thick. The main battery turrets were protected with 6.5 in (170 mm) faces and 3 in (76 mm) sides and tops, and they were supported by barbettes 6 inches thick. Portsmouth's conning tower had 5-inch sides.

== Service history ==
Portsmouth was laid down at the Newport News Shipbuilding & Dry Dock Company in Newport News, Virginia on 28 June 1943. She was launched on 20 September 1944 and was commissioned on 25 June 1945 with the hull number CL-102. The ship then embarked on her initial shakedown cruise that took Portsmouth as far south as Cuba. She was thereafter based in Norfolk, Virginia; by that time, World War II had ended, precluding any significant wartime service. The ship was assigned to the Operational Development Force, serving with that unit into 1946. Portsmouth embarked on a goodwill cruise to visit various ports in Africa, including Cape Town, South Africa; Lagos, Nigeria; Freetown, Sierra Leone; Monrovia, Liberia; Dakar, French Senegal; and Casablanca, French Morocco. From there, she continued into the Mediterranean Sea to visit Naples and Palermo, Italy. She thereafter returned to the United States.

The ship began another cruise to the Mediterranean on 25 November. She reached Naples on 7 December and then entered the Adriatic Sea, steaming as far north as Trieste by the end of December. She patrolled the area through February 1947, during a period of tension in the region in the aftermath of World War II. In March, she spent two weeks back in Trieste, and in April, she left the Mediterranean for home. A third Mediterranean cruise began in November and concluded with her arrival in Boston on 11 March 1948. She underwent an overhaul there and then took part in routine training operations off the East Coast of the United States. During this period, she also conducted training cruises for United States Navy Reserve personnel to the Caribbean. She sailed to the Philadelphia Naval Shipyard for a final overhaul in preparation of being reduced to the reserve fleet. She was decommissioned on 15 June 1949 and allocated to the Atlantic Reserve Fleet. She remained in the Navy's inventory through 1970. She was stricken from the naval register on 1 December that year and subsequently broken up.
