= USS Amsterdam (CL-101) =

Light cruiser of the United States Navy

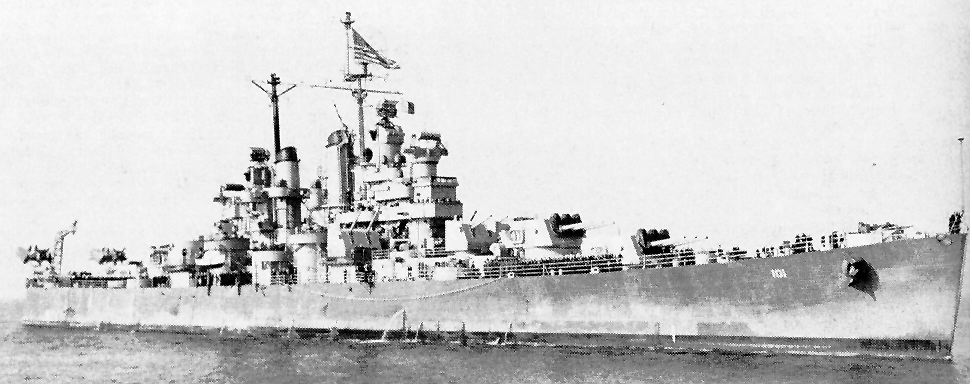
- USS Amsterdam, Astoria, Oregon, October 1945

History

United States
- Name: Amsterdam
- Namesake: City of Amsterdam, New York
- Builder: Newport News Shipbuilding & Dry Dock Company, Newport News, Virginia
- Laid down: 3 March 1943
- Launched: 25 April 1944
- Commissioned: 8 January 1945
- Decommissioned: 30 June 1947
- Stricken: 2 January 1971
- Fate: Sold for scrap 11 February 1972

General characteristics
- Class & type: Cleveland-class light cruiser
- Displacement: Standard: 11,744 long tons (11,932 t); Full load: 14,131 long tons (14,358 t)
- Length: 610 ft 1 in (185.95 m)
- Beam: 66 ft 4 in (20.22 m)
- Draft: 24 ft 6 in (7.47 m)
- Installed power: 4 × Babcock & Wilcox boilers; 100,000 shp (75,000 kW)
- Propulsion: 4 × steam turbines; 4 × screw propellers
- Speed: 32.5 knots (60.2 km/h; 37.4 mph)
- Range: 11,000 nmi (20,000 km; 13,000 mi) at 15 kn (28 km/h; 17 mph)
- Complement: 1,285 officers and enlisted
- Armament: 12 × 6 in (152 mm) Mark 16 guns; 12 × 5 in (127 mm)/38 caliber guns; 28 × 40 mm (1.6 in) Bofors anti-aircraft guns; 10 × 20 mm (0.79 in) Oerlikon anti-aircraft guns
- Armor: Belt: 3.5–5 in (89–127 mm); Deck: 2 in (51 mm); Barbettes: 6 in (152 mm); Turrets: 6 in (152 mm); Conning Tower: 5 in (127 mm)
- Aircraft carried: 4 × floatplanes
- Aviation facilities: 2 × stern catapults

USS Amsterdam (hull number: CL-101) was a Cleveland-class light cruiser of the United States Navy, which were built during World War II. The class was designed as a development of the earlier Brooklyn-class cruisers, the size of which had been limited by the First London Naval Treaty. The start of the war led to the dissolution of the treaty system, but the dramatic need for new vessels precluded a new design, so the Clevelands used the same hull as their predecessors, but were significantly heavier. The Clevelands carried a main battery of twelve 6-inch (152 mm) guns in four three-gun turrets, along with a secondary armament of twelve 5 in (127 mm) dual-purpose guns. They had a top speed of 32.5 knots (60.2 km/h; 37.4 mph).

The ship was laid down on 3 March 1943 at Newport News, Virginia, by the Newport News Shipbuilding & Dry Dock Company, launched on 25 April 1944, sponsored by Mrs. William E. Hasenfuss (the first "Gold Star Mother" of Amsterdam, New York, who had lost her son William E. Hasenfuss, Jr. in the Japanese attack on Pearl Harbor), and commissioned at the Norfolk Navy Yard Portsmouth, Virginia, on 8 January 1945, Captain Andrew P. Lawton in command.

== Design ==
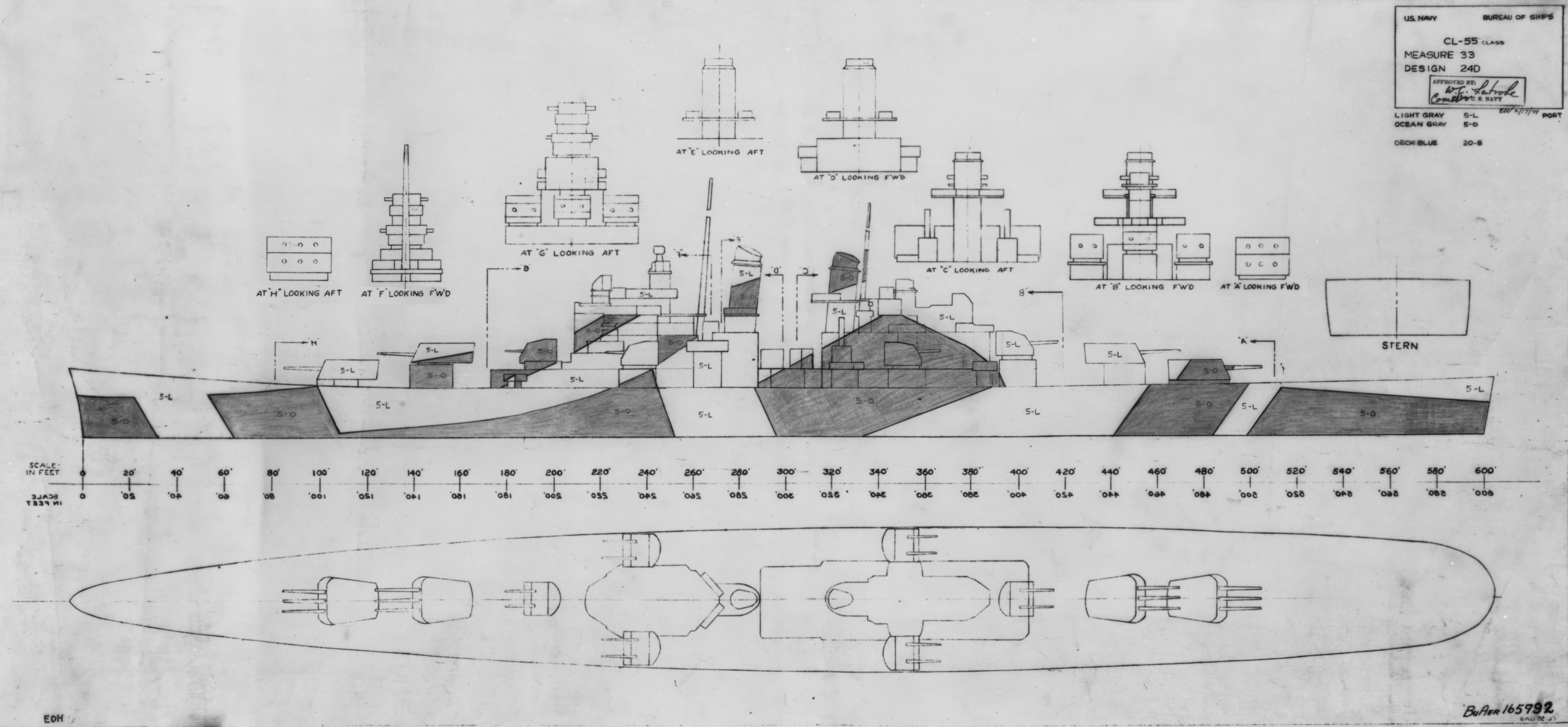
Depiction of the Cleveland class, showing the plan and profile

The Cleveland-class light cruisers traced their origin to design work done in the late 1930s; at the time, light cruiser displacement was limited to 8,000 long tons (8,100 t) by the Second London Naval Treaty. Following the start of World War II in September 1939, Britain announced it would suspend the treaty for the duration of the conflict, a decision the US Navy quickly followed. Though still neutral, the United States recognized that war was likely and the urgent need for additional ships ruled out an entirely new design, so the Clevelands were a close development of the earlier Brooklyn-class cruisers, the chief difference being the substitution of a two-gun 5 in (127 mm) dual-purpose gun mount for one of the main battery 6 in (152 mm) gun turrets.

Amsterdam was 610 feet 1 inch (186 m) long overall and had a beam of 66 ft 4 in (20.22 m) and a draft of 24 ft 6 in (7.47 m). Her standard displacement amounted to 11,744 long tons (11,932 t) and increased to 14,131 long tons (14,358 t) at full load. The ship was powered by four General Electric steam turbines, each driving one propeller shaft, using steam provided by four oil-fired Babcock & Wilcox boilers. Rated at 100,000 shaft horsepower (75,000 kW), the turbines were intended to give a top speed of 32.5 knots (60.2 km/h; 37.4 mph). Her crew numbered 1285 officers and enlisted men.

The ship was armed with a main battery of twelve 6 in /47-caliber Mark 16 guns (Note: /47 refers to the length of the gun in terms of calibers. A /47 gun is 47 times long as it is in bore diameter.) in four 3-gun turrets on the centerline. Two were placed forward in a superfiring pair; the other two turrets were placed aft of the superstructure in another superfiring pair. The secondary battery consisted of twelve 5 in (127 mm) /38-caliber dual-purpose guns mounted in twin turrets. Two of these were placed on the centerline, one directly behind the forward main turrets and the other just forward of the aft turrets. Two more were placed abreast of the conning tower and the other pair on either side of the aft superstructure. Anti-aircraft defense consisted of twenty-eight Bofors 40 mm (1.6 in) guns in four quadruple and six double mounts and ten Oerlikon 20 mm (0.79 in) guns in single mounts.

The ship's belt armor ranged in thickness from 3.5 to 5 in (89 to 127 mm), with the thicker section amidships where it protected the ammunition magazines and propulsion machinery spaces. Her deck armor was 2 in (51 mm) thick. The main battery turrets were protected with 6.5 in (170 mm) faces and 3 in (76 mm) sides and tops, and they were supported by barbettes 6 inches thick. Amsterdam's conning tower had 5-inch sides.

== Service history ==
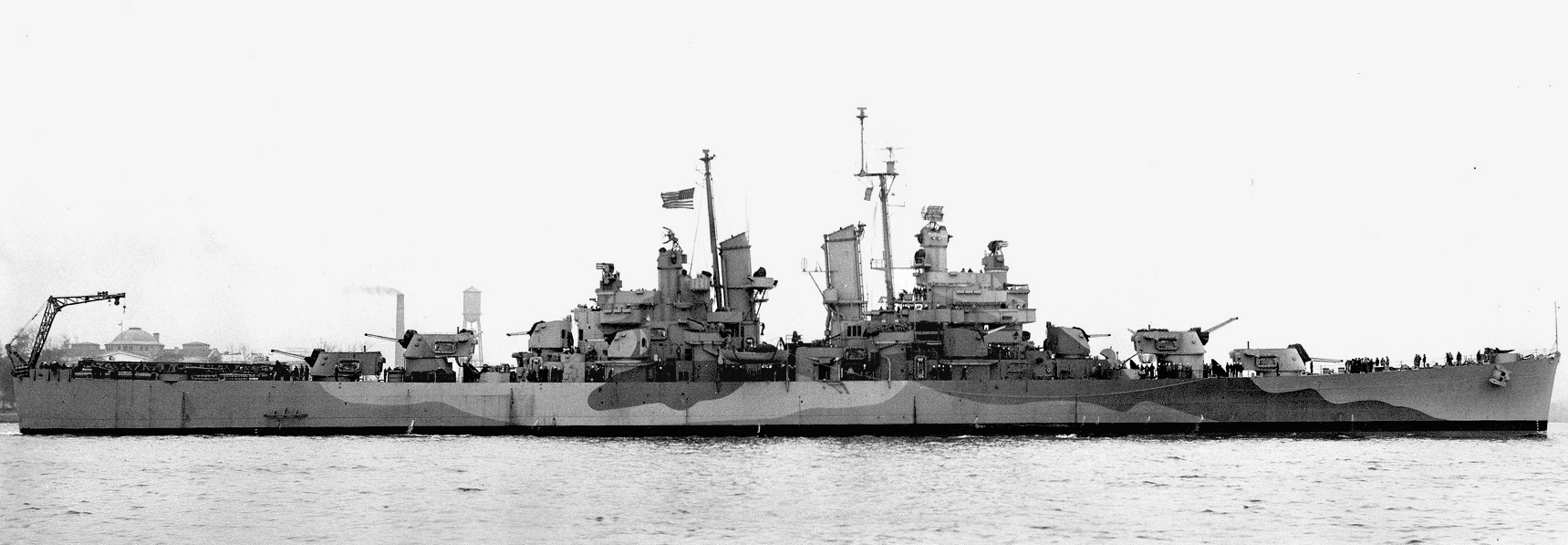
Profile view of Amsterdam

Amsterdam was built at the Newport News Shipbuilding & Dry Dock Company in Newport News, Virginia. She was laid down on 3 March 1943 and was launched on 25 March 1944. After completing fitting-out work, the ship was commissioned on 8 January 1945 with the hull number CL-101. The ship began her shakedown cruise in Chesapeake Bay on 5 February. Twelve days later, she departed Hampton Roads, Virginia, bound for Trinidad in the British West Indies. There, she conducted further training that lasted until 13 March, when she sailed back north to the US. While en route, she conducted shore bombardment practice off the island of Culebra. The ship arrived in Norfolk, Virginia on 20 March, steamed briefly to Cape May, New Jersey, for additional shooting practice, and then entered the dry dock at the Norfolk Navy Yard for maintenance. After completing that work on 20 April, the ship embarked on another round of training, initially in the Chesapeake and then in the Caribbean Sea off Culebra and Guantánamo Bay, Cuba. From there, she got underway to join the US fleet in the Pacific, passing through the Panama Canal on 5 May and arriving in Pearl Harbor on the 18th. She participated in further combat training there.

The ship left Pearl Harbor on 9 June to join the fleet at Leyte in the Philippine Islands. She reached San Pedro Bay on 21 June and joined 3rd Fleet. Rather than join the main elements of Task Force 38 for a major attack on Japan, Amsterdam was assigned to a detachment centered on the aircraft carrier Wasp. She formed part of the escort for the carrier, along with the cruisers Oklahoma City, Tucson, and Flint, and seven destroyers. The unit was sent to carry out a raid on Japanese positions on Wake Island on 18 July. By early August, Amsterdam and Oklahoma City had been transferred to Task Group 38.1. Over the next week, she covered the carriers of Task Force 38 during a series of raids on the Japanese home islands. On 15 August, the fleet received word of Japan's decision to surrender. By late August, Amsterdam had been transferred to TG 38.2. The ship entered Sagami Bay on 27 August with the rest of TF 38 to begin preparations for the formal surrender of Japan, which took place aboard the battleship Missouri on 2 September. The ship earned one battle star during her short wartime career.

On 5 September, Amsterdam moved to Tokyo Bay during the initial occupation of Japan; she remained there until 20 September, when she departed to return home. She stopped at Buckner Bay, Okinawa, to take on American personnel who were being sent back to the United States. After passing through Pearl Harbor, she arrived in Portland, Oregon, on 15 October, where she took part in the celebration of Navy Day two weeks later. She left Portland on 29 October for San Pedro, California, arriving on 1 November. While there, the ship underwent maintenance and the crew was given shore leave. Amsterdam got underway again on 19 November to return to Pearl Harbor six days later. She embarked another contingent of men and equipment to transport back to California, departing on 12 December and arriving in San Pedro on the 18th. She remained there into 1946 before departing on 21 January to move to San Francisco, where her crew prepared her to be relegated to the reserve fleet. After this work was completed, the ship was decommissioned on 30 June 1947. She remained in the Navy's inventory until 2 January 1971, when she was stricken from the naval register. She was ultimately sold to the ship breaking firm National Metal and Steel Corporation, Terminal Island, California, on 11 February 1972 and dismantled.
