= Cleveland-class cruiser =

Class of light cruisers of the United States Navy

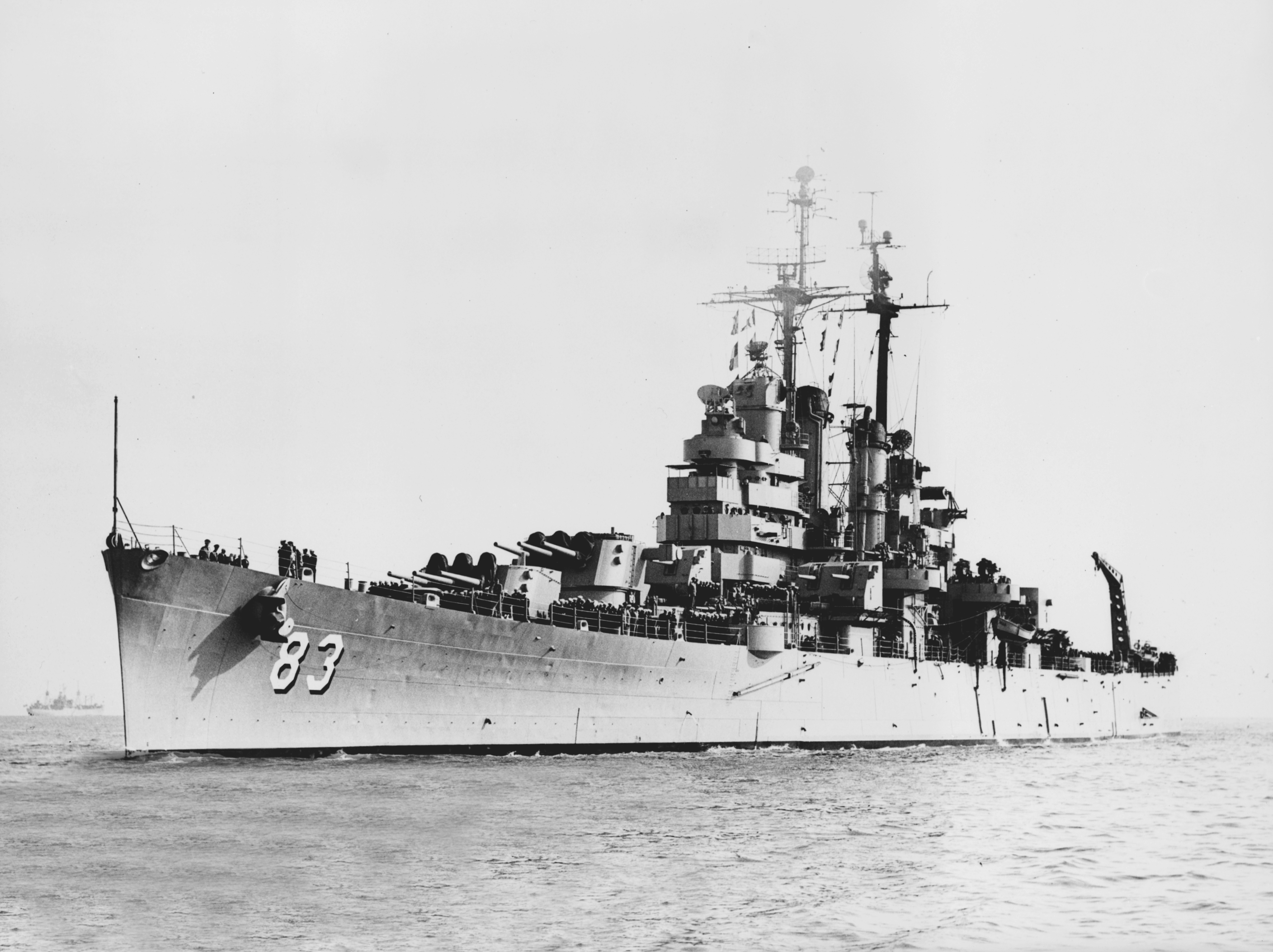
- USS Manchester on 31 October 1952

Class overview
- Name: Cleveland class
- Builders: New York Ship, NJ (8); Newport News , VA (8); Bethlehem, Fore River, MA (6); William Cramp & Sons, PA (5)
- Operators: United States Navy
- Preceded by: Brooklyn class
- Succeeded by: Fargo class
- Subclasses: Galveston class; Providence class
- Built: 1940–1958
- In commission: 1942–1979
- Planned: 52
- Completed: 27
- Canceled: 3, with a further 9 converted to light aircraft carriers and 13 reordered as Fargo-class cruisers
- Retired: 27
- Scrapped: 22 and 4 sunk as target
- Preserved: 1 (converted to a Galveston-class guided missile cruiser)

General characteristics
- Type: Light cruiser
- Displacement: 11,744 long tons (11,932 t) (standard); 14,131 long tons (14,358 t) (max)
- Length: 600 ft (180 m) wl; 608 ft 4 in (185.42 m) oa
- Beam: 66 ft 4 in (20.22 m)
- Height: 113 ft (34 m)
- Draft: 25 ft 6 in (7.77 m) (mean); 25 ft (7.6 m) (max)
- Installed power: 4 × Babcock & Wilcox boilers; 100,000 shp (75,000 kW)
- Propulsion: 4 × geared steam turbines; 4 × screws
- Speed: 32.5 knots (60.2 km/h; 37.4 mph)
- Range: 8,640 nmi (16,000 km; 9,940 mi) at 15 knots (28 km/h; 17 mph)
- Complement: 1,255 total; 70 officers; 1,115 enlisted men
- Sensors & processing systems: 2 × Mk34 GFCS (main); 2 × Mk37 GFCS(secondary); Early: SK-1 air-search radar; SK-2 air-search radar; SG surface-search radar; SP fighter-direction radar; Later: AN/SPS-6 air-search radar; SR-3 air-search radar; SP fighter-direction radar
- Armament: Cleveland 1942: 4 × triple 6"/47 caliber Mark 16 guns; 6 × dual 5"/38 caliber guns; 2 × quad Bofors 40 mm guns; 2 × dual Bofors 40 mm guns; 20 × single Oerlikon 20 mm cannons; Vicksburg 1944/1945: 4 × triple 6 in (150 mm)/47; 6 × dual 5 in (130 mm)/38 caliber; 4 × quad Bofors 40 mm guns; 6 × dual Bofors 40 mm guns; 10 × Oerlikon 20 mm cannons
- Armor: Belt: 3.25–5 in (83–127 mm); Deck: 2 in (51 mm); Bulkheads: 5 in (130 mm); Turrets Face: 6.50 in (165 mm); Turrets Roof: 3 in (76 mm); Turrets Sides: 3 in (76 mm); Turrets Rear: 1.5 in (38 mm); Barbettes: 6 in (150 mm); Conning tower: 2.25–5 in (57–127 mm)
- Aircraft carried: 4 × floatplanes
- Aviation facilities: 2 × stern catapults

The Cleveland-class was a group of light cruisers built for the United States Navy during World War II. Fifty-two were ordered, and 36 were completed, 27 as cruisers and nine as the Independence-class of light aircraft carriers. They were deactivated within a few years after the end of the war, but six were converted into missile ships, and some of these served into the 1970s. One ship of the class, USS Little Rock (CL-92), remains as a museum ship.

== Development ==
A development of the preceding Brooklyn-class cruiser, the Cleveland class was designed with increased cruising range, anti-aircraft armament, and torpedo protection compared with earlier U.S. cruisers.

After the London Naval Treaty of 1930, the U.S. Navy took up a renewed interest in the 6-inch gun-armed light cruiser, partially due to the Navy complaining about the 8-inch gun's slow rate of fire of three rounds per minute compared to the ten rounds per minute of 6-inch guns. At this time, the U.S. Navy began to deploy drones to use as targets for anti-aircraft targets, which could simulate both dive and torpedo bombers. The simulations showed that without fire control directors and computers, the ships of the fleet would be almost helpless against the density of aircraft attacks envisioned in any future war. Mechanical computers alone could weigh up to 10 tons and had to be housed below decks for both weight and protection measures. As World War II was to prove, the pre-war assumptions were optimistic as eventually, every anti-aircraft gun platform above 20 mm would end up having remote power, with fire control and radar aiming.

As designed, the Cleveland class was already a tight design, but requests to widen the ship were turned down as it would affect production rates. Shortly after the Fall of France, the Two-Ocean Navy Act changed those production rates rapidly. In order to fit the new heavier fire control and radar systems within the allotted tonnage for a cruiser, the No. 3 gun turret was omitted. This also gave room for the enlargement of the bridge spaces to accommodate the new combat information center and necessary radars, along with enough tonnage to fit an additional pair of 5-inch/38 twin mounts, located fore and aft of the superstructure, with wider arcs of fire. Despite the loss of three 6-inch guns compared to the preceding Brooklyn and St. Louis classes, the more advanced fire control gave the Cleveland class a firepower advantage in practical use.

Towards the end of World War II, the increase of light anti-aircraft weapons made the class top-heavy, so to compensate, some ships had one of the two catapults, and No. 1 turret rangefinders removed. Top weight issues would plague the class with every addition of equipment having to be weighed against what would have to be removed. For example, the tighter installation of the control radar necessitated the removal of the 20 mm clipping rooms, where 20 mm rounds were loaded into their magazines.

=== Subclasses ===
Fifty-two ships were originally planned, but nine of them were completed as the light aircraft carriers of the Independence class, and two were completed to a different design, with a more compact superstructure and a single stack, called the Fargo class. Of the 27 Cleveland class commissioned, one (Galveston) was completed as a guided missile cruiser, and five were later modified as Galveston and Providence-class guided missile cruisers. Two of each of these had enlarged superstructures to serve as flagships. Following the naming convention at the time, all the ships completed as cruisers were named for U.S. cities or towns.

== Service ==
The Cleveland-class cruisers served mainly in the Pacific Fleet during World War II, especially with the Fast Carrier Task Force, and some served off the coasts of Europe and Africa in the U.S. Atlantic Fleet. All of these warships, though worked heavily, survived the war. All were initially decommissioned by 1950, except for Manchester, which remained in service until 1956. None were recommissioned for the Korean War, as they required a crew almost as large as the Baltimore-class ships, so those were reactivated instead. All non-converted ships were sold off from the reserve fleet for scrapping beginning in 1959. The six that were completed as or converted into guided missile cruisers were reactivated during the 1950s and then served into the 1970s. All, particularly the Talos-armed ships, suffered from greater stability problems than the original design due to the extra top weight. This was particularly severe in Galveston, leading to its premature decommissioning in 1970. Oklahoma City and Little Rock had to have a large amount of ballast and internal rearrangement to allow service into the 1970s. The last of these missile ships in service, Oklahoma City, was decommissioned in December 1979.

=== Museum ship ===
One Cleveland-class ship remains. Little Rock, refit in 1960 and re-designated as Galveston-class guided missile light cruiser CLG-4 (later CG-4), is now a museum ship at the Buffalo and Erie County Naval & Military Park in Buffalo, New York, alongside the Fletcher-class destroyer The Sullivans, and the Gato-class submarine, Croaker.

== Ships in class ==
Construction data
Ship name	Hull no.	Builder	Laid down	Launched	Commissioned Recommissioned	Decommissioned	Fate
Cleveland	CL-55	New York Shipbuilding Corporation, Camden, New Jersey	1 July 1940	1 November 1941	15 June 1942	7 February 1947	Struck 1 March 1959; Sold for scrap, 18 February 1960
Columbia	CL-56	New York Shipbuilding Corporation, Camden, New Jersey	18 August 1940	17 December 1941	29 July 1942	30 November 1946	Struck 1 March 1959; Sold for scrap, 18 February 1959
Montpelier	CL-57	New York Shipbuilding Corporation, Camden, New Jersey	2 December 1940	12 February 1942	9 September 1942	24 January 1947	Struck 1 March 1959; Sold for scrap, 22 January 1960
Denver	CL-58	New York Shipbuilding Corporation, Camden, New Jersey	26 December 1940	4 April 1942	15 October 1942	7 February 1947	Struck 1 March 1959; Sold for scrap, 4 February 1960
Amsterdam	CL-59	New York Shipbuilding Corporation, Camden, New Jersey	1 May 1941	—N/a	—N/a	—N/a	Reordered as the light aircraft carrier USS Independence (CVL-22)
Santa Fe	CL-60	New York Shipbuilding Corporation, Camden, New Jersey	7 June 1941	10 June 1942	24 November 1942	29 October 1946	Struck 1 March 1959; Sold for scrap, 9 November 1959
Tallahassee	CL-61	New York Shipbuilding Corporation, Camden, New Jersey	2 June 1941	—N/a	—N/a	—N/a	Reordered as the light aircraft carrier USS Princeton (CVL-23)
Birmingham	CL-62	Newport News Shipbuilding and Dry Dock Company, Newport News, Virginia	17 February 1941	20 March 1942	29 January 1943	2 January 1947	Struck 1 March 1959; Sold for scrap, 12 November 1959
Mobile	CL-63	Newport News Shipbuilding and Dry Dock Company, Newport News, Virginia	14 April 1941	15 May 1942	24 March 1943	9 May 1947	Struck 1 March 1959; Sold for scrap, 16 December 1959
Vincennes (ex-Flint)	CL-64	Bethlehem Steel Corporation, Fore River Shipyard, Quincy, Massachusetts	7 March 1942	17 July 1943	21 January 1944	10 September 1946	Struck 1 April 1966; Sunk as target, 28 October 1969
Pasadena	CL-65	Bethlehem Steel Corporation, Fore River Shipyard, Quincy, Massachusetts	6 February 1943	28 December 1943	8 June 1944	12 January 1950	Struck 1 December 1970; Sold for scrap, 5 July 1972
Springfield	CL-66	Bethlehem Steel Corporation, Fore River Shipyard, Quincy, Massachusetts	13 February 1943	9 March 1944	9 September 1944	30 September 1949	Struck 31 July 1980; Sold for scrap, 11 March 1980
Springfield	CLG-7	Bethlehem Steel Corporation, Fore River Shipyard, Quincy, Massachusetts	13 February 1943	9 March 1944	2 July 1960	15 May 1974	Struck 31 July 1980; Sold for scrap, 11 March 1980
Topeka	CL-67	Bethlehem Steel Corporation, Fore River Shipyard, Quincy, Massachusetts	21 April 1943	19 August 1944	23 December 1944	18 June 1949	Struck 1 December 1973; Sold for scrap, 20 March 1975
Topeka	CLG-8	Bethlehem Steel Corporation, Fore River Shipyard, Quincy, Massachusetts	21 April 1943	19 August 1944	26 March 1960	5 June 1969	Struck 1 December 1973; Sold for scrap, 20 March 1975
New Haven	CL-76	New York Shipbuilding Corporation, Camden, New Jersey	11 August 1941	—N/a	—N/a	—N/a	Reordered as the light aircraft carrier USS Belleau Wood (CVL-24)
Huntington	CL-77	New York Shipbuilding Corporation, Camden, New Jersey	17 November 1941	—N/a	—N/a	—N/a	Reordered as the light aircraft carrier USS Cowpens (CVL-25)
Dayton	CL-78	New York Shipbuilding Corporation, Camden, New Jersey	29 December 1941	—N/a	—N/a	—N/a	Reordered as the light aircraft carrier USS Monterey (CVL-26)
Wilmington	CL-79	New York Shipbuilding Corporation, Camden, New Jersey	16 March 1942	—N/a	—N/a	—N/a	Reordered as the light aircraft carrier USS Cabot (CVL-28)
Biloxi	CL-80	Newport News Shipbuilding and Dry Dock Company, Newport News, Virginia	9 July 1941	23 February 1943	31 August 1943	29 August 1946	Struck 1 December 1961; Sold for scrap, 5 March 1962
Houston (ex-Vicksburg)	CL-81	Newport News Shipbuilding and Dry Dock Company, Newport News, Virginia	4 August 1941	19 June 1943	20 December 1943	15 December 1947	Struck 1 March 1959; Sold for scrap, 1 June 1961
Providence	CL-82	Bethlehem Steel Corporation, Fore River Shipyard, Quincy, Massachusetts	27 July 1943	28 December 1944	15 May 1945	14 June 1949	Struck 30 September 1978; Sold for scrap, 15 July 1980
Providence	CLG-6	Bethlehem Steel Corporation, Fore River Shipyard, Quincy, Massachusetts	27 July 1943	28 December 1944	17 September 1959	31 August 1973	Struck 30 September 1978; Sold for scrap, 15 July 1980
Manchester	CL-83	Bethlehem Steel Corporation, Fore River Shipyard, Quincy, Massachusetts	25 September 1944	5 March 1946	29 October 1946	27 June 1956	Struck 1 April 1960; Sold for scrap, 31 October 1961
Buffalo	CL-84	Federal Shipbuilding and Drydock Company, Kearny, New Jersey	—N/a	—N/a	—N/a	—N/a	Cancelled, 16 December 1940
Fargo	CL-85	New York Shipbuilding Corporation, Camden, New Jersey	11 April 1942	—N/a	—N/a	—N/a	Reordered as the light aircraft carrier USS Langley (CVL-27)
Vicksburg (ex-Cheyenne)	CL-86	Newport News Shipbuilding and Dry Dock Company, Newport News, Virginia	26 October 1942	14 December 1943	12 June 1944	30 June 1947	Struck 1 October 1962; Sold for scrap, 25 August 1964
Duluth	CL-87	Newport News Shipbuilding and Dry Dock Company, Newport News, Virginia	9 November 1942	13 January 1944	18 September 1944	25 June 1949	Struck 1 January 1960; Sold for scrap, 14 November 1960
Newark	CL-88	Federal Shipbuilding and Drydock Company, Kearny, New Jersey	—N/a	—N/a	—N/a	—N/a	Cancelled 16 December 1940
Miami	CL-89	William Cramp & Sons Shipbuilding Company, Philadelphia, Pennsylvania	2 August 1941	8 December 1942	28 December 1943	30 June 1947	Struck 1 September 1961; Sold for scrap, 20 July 1962
Astoria (ex-Wilkes-Barre)	CL-90	William Cramp & Sons Shipbuilding Company, Philadelphia, Pennsylvania	6 September 1941	6 March 1943	17 May 1944	1 July 1949	Struck 1 November 1969; Sold for scrap, 12 January 1971
Oklahoma City	CL-91	William Cramp & Sons Shipbuilding Company, Philadelphia, Pennsylvania	8 December 1942	20 February 1944	22 December 1944	30 June 1947	Struck 15 December 1979; Sunk as target, 25 March 1999
Oklahoma City	CLG-5	William Cramp & Sons Shipbuilding Company, Philadelphia, Pennsylvania	8 December 1942	20 February 1944	7 September 1960	15 December 1979	Struck 15 December 1979; Sunk as target, 25 March 1999
Little Rock	CL-92	William Cramp & Sons Shipbuilding Company, Philadelphia, Pennsylvania	6 March 1943	27 August 1944	17 June 1945	24 June 1949	Struck 22 November 1976; Donated to the Buffalo and Erie County Naval & Military Park as a Museum ship, 1 June 1977
Little Rock	CLG- 4	William Cramp & Sons Shipbuilding Company, Philadelphia, Pennsylvania	6 March 1943	27 August 1944	3 June 1960	22 November 1976	Struck 22 November 1976; Donated to the Buffalo and Erie County Naval & Military Park as a Museum ship, 1 June 1977
Galveston	CL-93	William Cramp & Sons Shipbuilding Company, Philadelphia, Pennsylvania	20 February 1944	22 April 1945	28 May 1958	May 1970	Struck 21 December 1973; Sold for scrap, 16 May 1975
Galveston	CLG-3	William Cramp & Sons Shipbuilding Company, Philadelphia, Pennsylvania	20 February 1944	22 April 1945	28 May 1958	May 1970	Struck 21 December 1973; Sold for scrap, 16 May 1975
Youngstown	CL-94	William Cramp & Sons Shipbuilding Company, Philadelphia, Pennsylvania	4 September 1944	—N/a	—N/a	—N/a	Contract cancelled, 12 August 1945
Buffalo	CL-99	New York Shipbuilding Corporation, Camden, New Jersey	31 August 1942	—N/a	—N/a	—N/a	Reordered as the light aircraft carrier USS Bataan (CVL-29)
Newark	CL-100	New York Shipbuilding Corporation, Camden, New Jersey	26 October 1942	—N/a	—N/a	—N/a	Reordered as the light aircraft carrier USS San Jacinto (CVL-30)
Amsterdam	CL-101	Newport News Shipbuilding and Dry Dock Company, Newport News, Virginia	3 March 1943	25 April 1944	8 January 1945	30 June 1947	Struck 2 January 1971; Sold for scrap, 11 February 1972
Portsmouth	CL-102	Newport News Shipbuilding and Dry Dock Company, Newport News, Virginia	28 June 1943	20 September 1944	25 June 1945	15 June 1949	Struck 15 January 1971; Sold for scrap, 26 February 1974
Wilkes-Barre	CL-103	New York Shipbuilding Corporation, Camden, New Jersey	14 December 1942	24 December 1943	1 July 1944	9 October 1947	Struck 15 January 1971; Sunk in testing, 13 May 1972
Atlanta	CL-104	New York Shipbuilding Corporation, Camden, New Jersey	25 January 1943	6 February 1944	3 December 1944	1 July 1949	Struck 1 October 1962; Sunk in testing, 1 October 1970
Dayton	CL-105	New York Shipbuilding Corporation, Camden, New Jersey	8 March 1943	19 March 1944	7 January 1945	1 March 1949	Struck 1 September 1961; Sold for scrap, 6 April 1962

== See also ==
- List of cruisers of the United States Navy

== Bibliography ==
- Wright, C. C. (1998). "Question 51/96: Anti-Aircraft Armament of US Cleveland Class Cruisers". Warship International. XXXV (1): 90.
