= USS Pasadena (CL-65) =

Light cruiser of the United States Navy

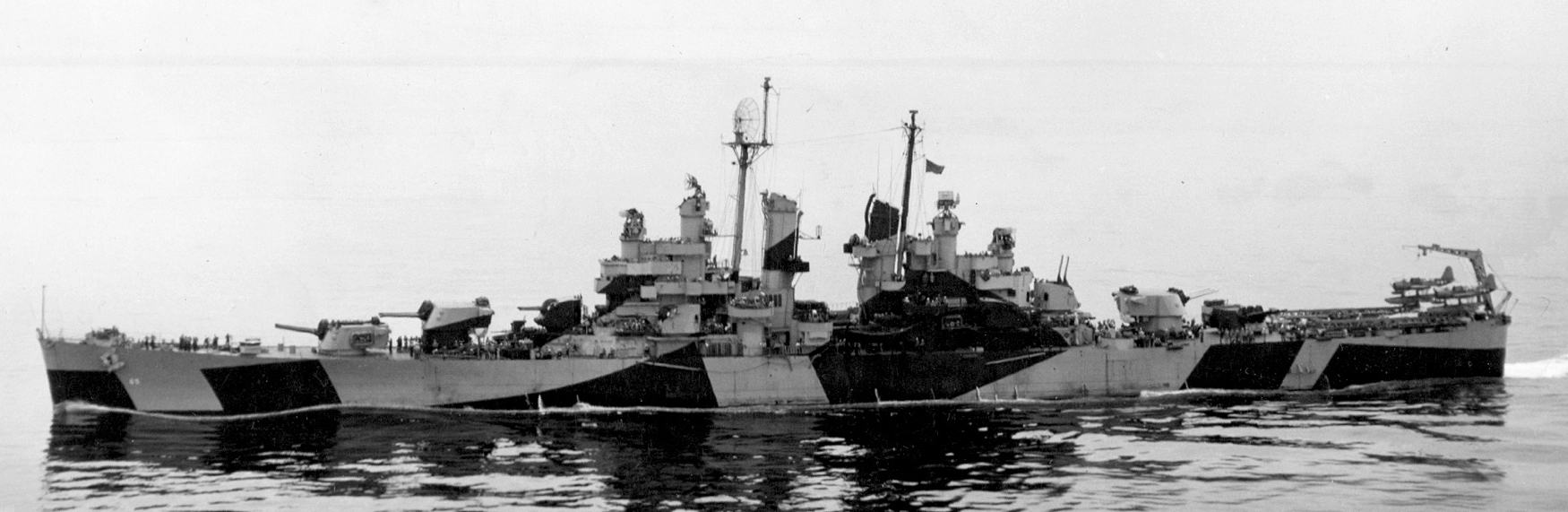
- USS Pasadena (CL-65) July 1944

History

United States
- Name: Pasadena
- Namesake: City of Pasadena, California
- Builder: Fore River Shipyard
- Laid down: 6 February 1943
- Launched: 28 December 1943
- Commissioned: 8 June 1944
- Decommissioned: 12 January 1950
- Stricken: 1 December 1970
- Fate: Sold for scrap on 5 July 1972

General characteristics
- Class & type: Cleveland-class light cruiser
- Displacement: Standard: 11,744 long tons (11,932 t); Full load: 14,131 long tons (14,358 t)
- Length: 610 ft 1 in (185.95 m)
- Beam: 66 ft 4 in (20.22 m)
- Draft: 24 ft 6 in (7.47 m)
- Installed power: 4 × Babcock & Wilcox boilers; 100,000 shp (75,000 kW)
- Propulsion: 4 × steam turbines; 4 × screw propellers
- Speed: 32.5 knots (60.2 km/h; 37.4 mph)
- Range: 11,000 nmi (20,000 km; 13,000 mi) at 15 kn (28 km/h; 17 mph)
- Complement: 1,285 officers and enlisted
- Armament: 12 × 6 in (152 mm) Mark 16 guns; 12 × 5 in (127 mm)/38 caliber guns; 24 × 40 mm (1.6 in) Bofors anti-aircraft guns; 21 × 20 mm (0.79 in) Oerlikon anti-aircraft guns
- Armor: Belt: 3.5–5 in (89–127 mm); Deck: 2 in (51 mm); Barbettes: 6 in (152 mm); Turrets: 6 in (152 mm); Conning Tower: 5 in (127 mm)
- Aircraft carried: 4 × floatplanes
- Aviation facilities: 2 × stern catapults

USS Pasadena (hull number: CL-65) was a Cleveland-class light cruiser of the United States Navy, which were built during World War II. The class was designed as a development of the earlier Brooklyn-class cruisers, the size of which had been limited by the First London Naval Treaty. The start of the war led to the dissolution of the treaty system, but the dramatic need for new vessels precluded a new design, so the Clevelands used the same hull as their predecessors, but were significantly heavier. The Clevelands carried a main battery of twelve 6-inch (152 mm) guns in four three-gun turrets, along with a secondary armament of twelve 5 in (127 mm) dual-purpose guns. They had a top speed of 32.5 knots (60.2 km/h; 37.4 mph).

== Design ==
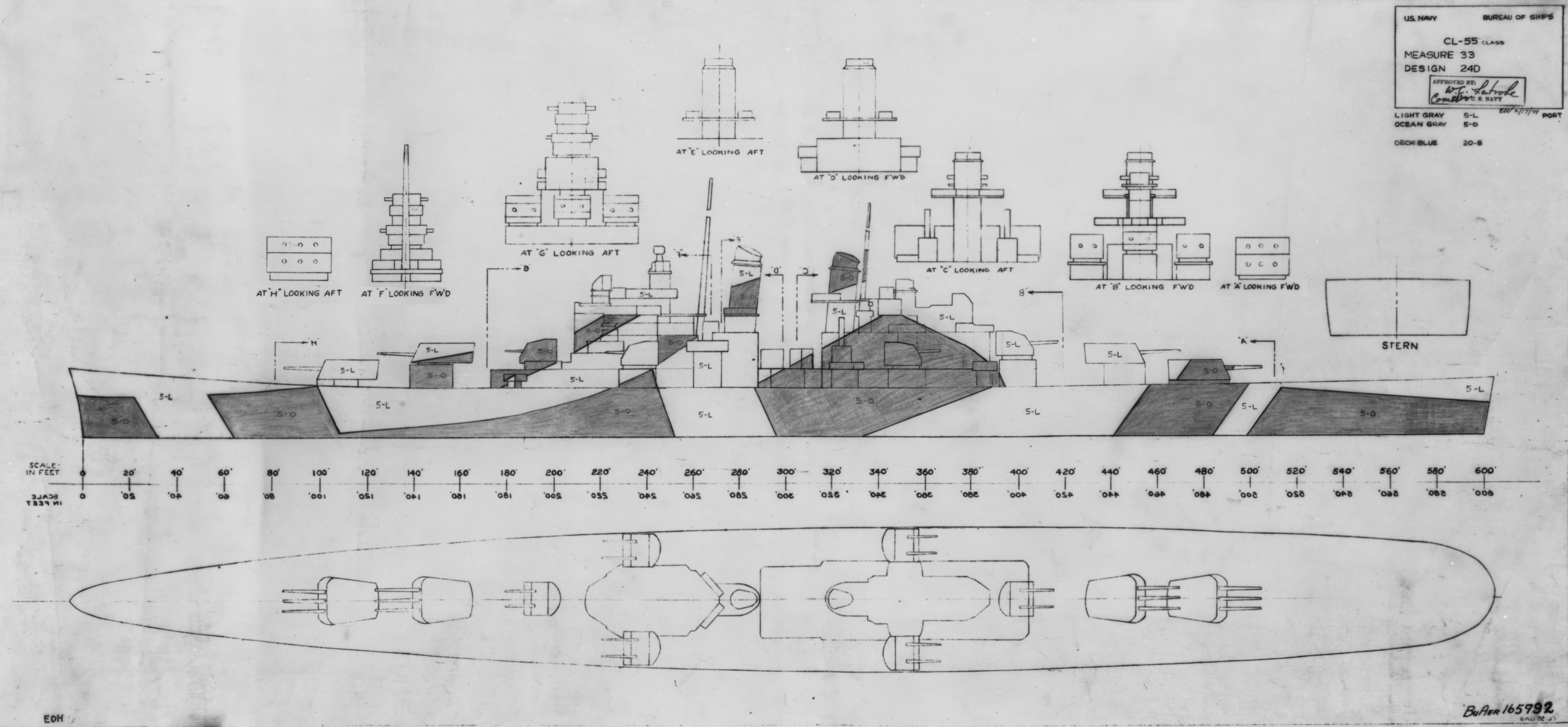
Depiction of the Cleveland class, showing the plan and profile

The Cleveland-class light cruisers traced their origin to design work done in the late 1930s; at the time, light cruiser displacement was limited to 8,000 long tons (8,100 t) by the Second London Naval Treaty. Following the start of World War II in September 1939, Britain announced it would suspend the treaty for the duration of the conflict, a decision the US Navy quickly followed. Though still neutral, the United States recognized that war was likely and the urgent need for additional ships ruled out an entirely new design, so the Clevelands were a close development of the earlier Brooklyn-class cruisers, the chief difference being the substitution of a two-gun 5 in (127 mm) dual-purpose gun mount for one of the main battery 6 in (152 mm) gun turrets.

Pasadena was 610 feet 1 inch (186 m) long overall and had a beam of 66 ft 4 in (20.22 m) and a draft of 24 ft 6 in (7.47 m). Her standard displacement amounted to 11,744 long tons (11,932 t) and increased to 14,131 long tons (14,358 t) at full load. The ship was powered by four General Electric steam turbines, each driving one propeller shaft, using steam provided by four oil-fired Babcock & Wilcox boilers. Rated at 100,000 shaft horsepower (75,000 kW), the turbines were intended to give a top speed of 32.5 knots (60.2 km/h; 37.4 mph). Her crew numbered 1285 officers and enlisted men.

The ship was armed with a main battery of twelve 6 in /47-caliber Mark 16 guns (Note: /47 refers to the length of the gun in terms of calibers. A /47 gun is 47 times long as it is in bore diameter.) in four 3-gun turrets on the centerline. Two were placed forward in a superfiring pair; the other two turrets were placed aft of the superstructure in another superfiring pair. The secondary battery consisted of twelve 5 in (127 mm) /38-caliber dual-purpose guns mounted in twin turrets. Two of these were placed on the centerline, one directly behind the forward main turrets and the other just forward of the aft turrets. Two more were placed abreast of the conning tower and the other pair on either side of the aft superstructure. Anti-aircraft defense consisted of twenty-four Bofors 40 mm (1.6 in) guns in four quadruple and four double mounts and twenty-one Oerlikon 20 mm (0.79 in) guns in single mounts.

The ship's belt armor ranged in thickness from 3.5 to 5 in (89 to 127 mm), with the thicker section amidships where it protected the ammunition magazines and propulsion machinery spaces. Her deck armor was 2 in (51 mm) thick. The main battery turrets were protected with 6.5 in (170 mm) faces and 3 in (76 mm) sides and tops, and they were supported by barbettes 6 inches thick. Pasadena's conning tower had 5-inch sides.

== Service history ==
The keel for Pasadena was laid down at the Fore River Shipyard on 6 February 1943. She was launched of 28 December, and was commissioned on 8 June 1944. After entering service, she carried out a shakedown cruise and initial training into September, before departing on 25 September to join American naval forces fighting in the Pacific Theater of World War II. She reached the Navy's forward operating base at Ulithi in mid-November, where she joined the Fast Carrier Task Force, then designated Task Force 38. Pasadena operated as part of the screen for the task force's aircraft carriers as they carried out a series of strikes against Japanese targets in the Philippines and Formosa to support the Philippines campaign. These operations carried on into 1945, and in January, the unit entered the South China Sea to strike Japanese installations in French Indochina and Formosa. Attacks on Japan itself followed in February, and then the carriers turned their attention to the invasion of Iwo Jima later that month. During the battle on that island, Pasadena took part in shore bombardment operations to support the marines fighting to secure it.

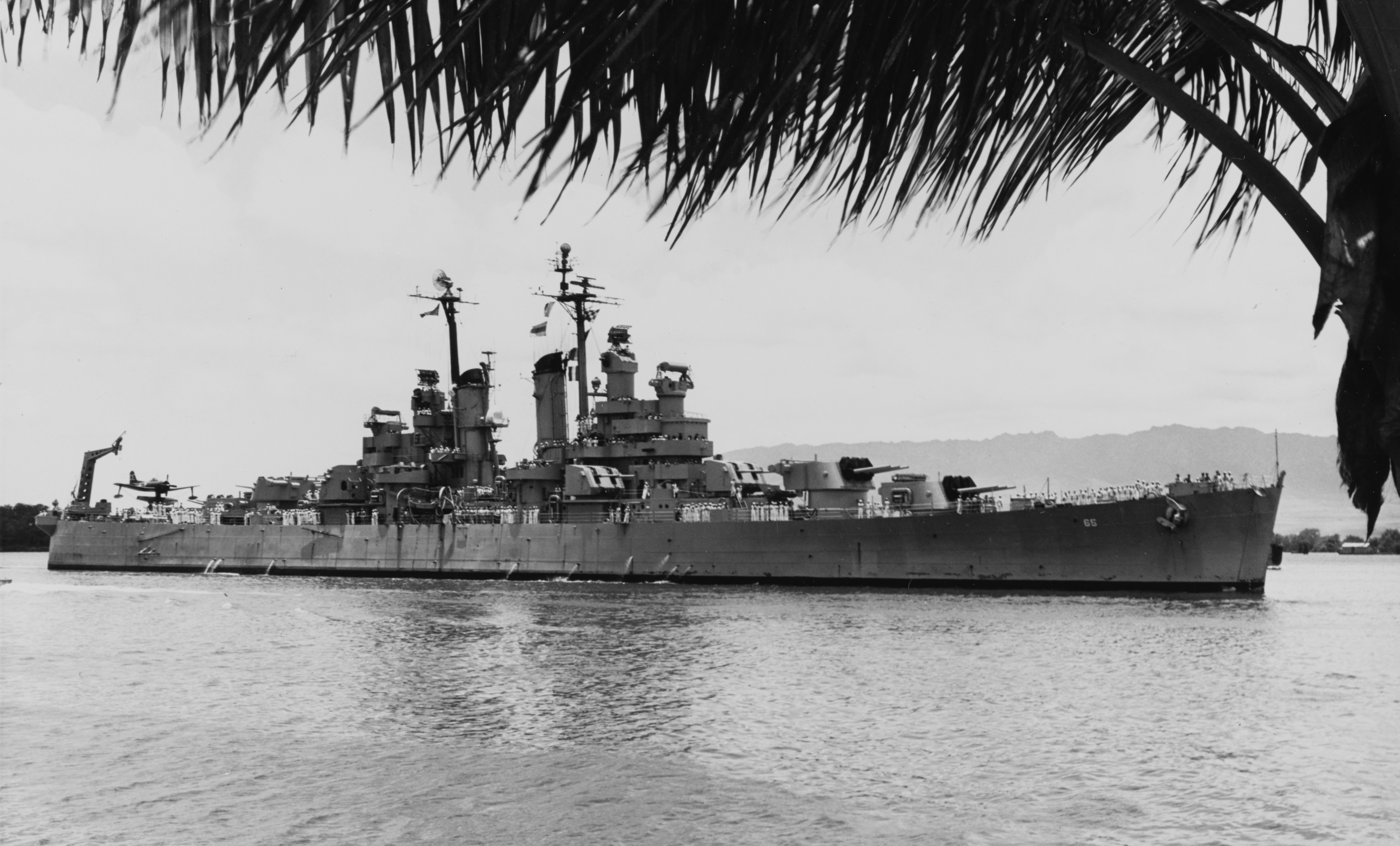
Pasadena entering Pearl Harbor in 1948

The Fast Carrier Task Force then returned to Ulithi to replenish stores and take on munitions before getting underway again in mid-March to begin the preparatory attacks on Okinawa in advance of the invasion of that island. These included air raids on the northern Ryukyu Islands and southern Japan to neutralize forces that would interfere with the planned landings. During this period, Pasadena served as the flagship of Cruiser Division 17, which carried out night bombardments of Minami Daito on 28 March and 10 May. Operations off Okinawa to support the forces that had gone ashore in April continued through the end of May, and in June, the Fast Carrier Task Force withdrew to Ulithi for another period of rest and replenishment. The ships sortied once again in early July to begin another round of attacks on the Japanese home islands; these attacks continued until mid-August, stopping only on 15 August when Japan indicated it would surrender unconditionally. Pasadena thereafter took part in the occupation of Japan; she became the flagship of Task Group 35.1 on 23 August, and four days later she dropped anchor in Sagami Bay outside Tokyo. On 1 September, she moved to Tokyo Bay in preparation for the formal surrender ceremony that took place the following day. In her relatively brief wartime career, Pasadena was awarded five battle stars.

Pasadena remained in Tokyo Bay through mid-January 1946, helping to oversee the occupation of the Japanese capital. She was recalled home on 19 January for an overhaul in San Pedro, California. After she emerged from the shipyard, she took part in training exercises in the area until September, when she sailed back to the central Pacific. She took part in divisional training exercises in Micronesia from November 1946 to February 1947, followed by fleet maneuvers off Hawaii, before returning to California. The year 1948 began with training maneuvers off California, followed by an NROTC training cruise. She made another voyage to East Asia on 1 October, which included a visit to Qingdao, China, at the end of the month. She patrolled off the Chinese coast until May 1949, when she once again returned to California, arriving on 1 June. Over the following months, she took part in training exercises in the area before going to sea for the last time on 12 September, bound for Bremerton, Washington, where she was laid up in the Pacific Reserve Fleet. She was formally decommissioned on 12 January 1950. She remained there until 1970. She was stricken from the naval register on 1 December that year and thereafter discarded.
