= Brooklyn-class cruiser =

1937 class of light cruisers of the United States Navy

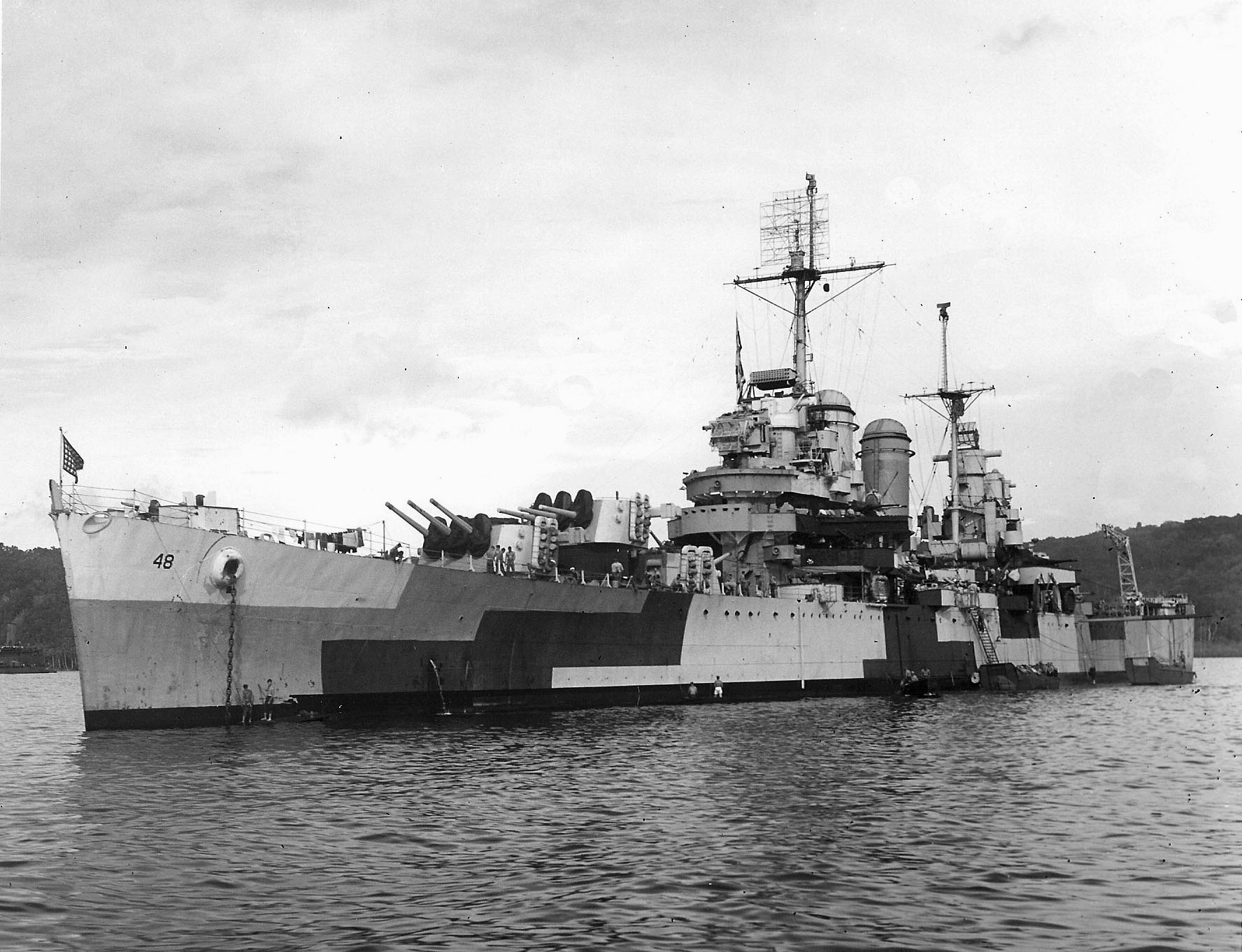
- USS Honolulu (CL-48) in 1944

Class overview
- Name: Brooklyn class
- Builders: Brooklyn Navy Yard, NY (3); New York Ship, NJ (3); Newport News, VA (2); Philadelphia Naval Shipyard, PA (1)
- Operators: United States Navy; Argentine Navy; Brazilian Navy; Chilean Navy
- Preceded by: Omaha class
- Succeeded by: Atlanta class; Cleveland class
- Subclasses: St. Louis class
- Built: 1935–1938
- In service: 1938–1992
- In commission: 1937–1992
- Planned: 9
- Completed: 9
- Lost: 2
- Retired: 7

General characteristics
- Type: Light cruiser
- Displacement: 9,767 long tons (9,924 t) (standard); 12,207 long tons (12,403 t) (full load)
- Length: 600 ft (180 m) wl; 608 ft 4 in (185.42 m) oa
- Beam: 62 ft (19 m)
- Draft: 23 ft (7.0 m)
- Installed power: 8 × Babcock & Wilcox boilers; 100,000 shp (74,570 kW)
- Propulsion: 4 × Parsons geared turbines; 4 × shafts
- Speed: 32.5 knots (60.2 km/h; 37.4 mph)
- Range: 10,000 nmi (19,000 km; 12,000 mi) at 15 knots (28 km/h; 17 mph)
- Boats & landing craft carried: 2 × lifeboats
- Complement: 868
- Sensors & processing systems: Mk34 GFCS (6in main); Mk33 GFCS (5in secondary); SK-2 air-search radar
- Armament: 5 × triple 6"/47 caliber guns; 8 × single 5"/25 caliber guns (Brooklyn through Honolulu); 4 × dual 5"/38 caliber guns (St. Louis and Helena); 8 × single M2 Browning machine guns
- Armor: Main belt; At machinery: 5 in (127 mm) on 0.625-inch (16 mm) STS plate; At magazines: 2 in (51 mm) on 0.625-inch STS plate; Deck: 2 in; Barbettes: 6 in (152 mm); Gun turret; Turret roofs: 2 in; Turret sides: 1.25 in (31.75 mm); Turret face: 6.5 in (165 mm); Conning tower: 5 in
- Aircraft carried: 4 × floatplanes
- Aviation facilities: 2 × aircraft catapults

The Brooklyn-class was a class of nine light cruisers built for the United States Navy between 1935 and 1938. Armed with five triple 6-inch (152 mm) gun turrets (three forward, two aft), they mounted more main battery guns than any other standard US cruiser. The Brooklyn-class ships were all commissioned between 1937 and 1939, in the time between the start of the Second Sino-Japanese War and before the invasion of Poland. They served extensively in both the Pacific and Atlantic theaters during World War II.

Helena was sunk in the Pacific, and while some of the others were heavily damaged, the remaining ships of the class were decommissioned shortly after the end of the war. Six were transferred to South American navies in 1951, where they served for many more years. One of these, ARA General Belgrano, formerly Phoenix, was sunk during the Falklands War in 1982.

The Brooklyn-class ships had a strong influence on US cruiser design. Nearly all subsequent US cruisers, heavy and light, were directly or indirectly based on them. Notable among these are the Cleveland-class light cruiser and Baltimore-class heavy cruiser of World War II.

== Design ==
The Brooklyn-class design was a further refinement of the New Orleans-class heavy cruiser that preceded it. The desire for the Brooklyns arose from the London Naval Treaty of 1930, which limited the construction of heavy cruisers, i.e., ships carrying guns with calibers between 6.1 and 8 inches (155 and 203 mm). Great Britain needed trade control cruisers and hoped that the treaty would limit nations to smaller cruisers with a 6,000-to-8,000-long-ton (6,096 to 8,128 t) range that she could afford. Agreement to the London Treaty and the proceeding with the American light cruiser design can be focused to Admiral William V. Pratt, who overrode the vehement objections of the General Board.

Under the treaty the US was allowed 180,000 long tons (182,888 t) for 18 heavy cruisers and 143,500 long tons (145,803 t), with no limit on the number of ships, for light cruisers. The United States needed large cruisers to deal with the extreme ranges that operations in the Pacific Ocean required. Cruisers with 6-inch (150 mm) guns and 10,000 long tons (10,160 t) were therefore desired. The US Navy's experience with the Omaha class was not all that could be hoped for. Their light hull design caused a stressed hull and was very overweight.

Design started in 1930, with the first four of the class ordered in 1933, and an additional three ships in 1934. Basic criteria had been that speed and range should match heavy cruisers, and when the Japanese Mogami class carrying fifteen 6-inch main guns appeared, the new US ships would match their weaponry. Various combinations of armor and power plants were tried in the efforts to stay below the Treaty 10,000 ton limit. Aviation facilities were moved to the stern of the ship from the amidships position of the New Orleans-class cruisers.

From 1942, the bridge structure was lowered and radar was fitted.

=== St. Louis subclass ===
The last two ships of the class, St. Louis and Helena, were slightly modified versions of the design with new higher pressure boilers and a unit system of machinery that alternated boiler and engine rooms to prevent a ship from being immobilized by a single unlucky hit; this system would be used in all subsequent US cruisers. Additionally, AA armament was improved. They were the first US cruisers to be armed with twin 5-inch (127 mm)/38-caliber guns. They could be distinguished visually from the other Brooklyns by the placement of the after deckhouse, immediately abaft the second funnel, and by the twin 5-inch mounts.

=== Armament ===
The Brooklyn class was equipped with 15 6-inch/47 caliber Mark 16 naval guns, developed from the 6-inch/53 caliber Mark 8 used on the Omaha-class cruiser. The decision was reached as the gun could achieve up to ten rounds per minute rate of fire. This gave the class the ability to send up to 150 rounds a minute at its intended target. This allowed the cruiser to smother an enemy ship with fire. The turret arrangement was five turrets, each mounting three guns on a single sleeve, which did not allow the guns in a turret to move independently. The 6-inch guns were of a new design, the Mark 16, which could fire a 130-pound (59-kilogram) armor-piercing shell (AP) up to 26,100 yards (23,866 m) with twice the penetrative power of the old gun. The ammunition was of the semi-fixed type. The impact of the shell changed the General Board's view on the usefulness of light cruisers in service.

As designed, the anti-aircraft weaponry specified eight 5-inch (127 mm)/25 caliber guns and eight .50 inches (12.7 mm) caliber M2 Browning machine guns. The intention to mount 1.1-inch (28 mm)/75 caliber anti-aircraft guns was frustrated and the requirement was not fully met until 1943. The weapon as deployed was less than satisfactory with frequent jamming and weight being serious issues. Some of the class had 5-in/38 caliber guns installed versus the 5-in/25 guns. There were varied mixes of 20-millimeter (0.79 in) Oerlikon cannons and 40-millimeter (1.6 in) Bofors gun mountings actually installed during World War II, 28 40 mm (4 × 4, 6 × 2) and twenty 20 mm (10 × 2) being the most common.

=== Fire control ===
The Brooklyn class was deployed with the Mark 34 director and later the Mark 3 radar. This would be upgraded to the Mark 8 and again to the Mark 13 radar. The secondary battery was controlled by the Mark 28 and upgraded to the Mark 33 fire control systems. The associated radars were the Mark 4 fire control radar and upgraded again to the Mark 12. Two anti-aircraft fire directors were fitted to each ship. A late World War II refit saw the Mk 51 director installed for the Bofors guns. Night engagements were improved when in 1945, the Mark 57 and 63 directors were installed.

== Successors ==
The vast majority of cruisers built by the United States during World War II derive from the Brooklyn design. Modifications of the Brooklyn-class hull were the predecessors to the two main lines of wartime cruisers, respectively the Cleveland-class light cruiser armed with 6-inch guns and Baltimore-class heavy cruiser armed with 8-inch guns. The third line, the Atlanta-class light cruiser armed with 5-inch guns, shared the same unit system of machinery arrangement as the other two lines, but on a smaller hull with two shafts instead of four.

The Brooklyn class would lead to the Cleveland-class light cruiser (less a fifth triple 6-inch turret), which then led to the Fargo-class cruiser and finally the Worcester-class cruiser. The other successor was USS Wichita, built on a modified Brooklyn-class hull, with a heavy cruiser armament featuring three rather than five triple turrets, but each turret containing larger 8-inch guns, and increased armor. Wichita was succeeded by the Baltimore class and the later Oregon City-class cruiser class, and finally the upgraded Des Moines-class cruiser. The Atlanta class would be succeeded by the Juneau class and then almost by the cancelled CL-154 class. As the Baltimore class began building about a year after the Cleveland class, later Cleveland developments and improvements were incorporated into the Baltimore-class hull.

Finally, both Cleveland and Baltimore hulls were converted to light aircraft carriers. The Independence class of light aircraft carriers, were converted from Cleveland-class cruisers under construction, and the Saipan-class light carriers used the basic form of the Baltimore-class cruiser design.

== Ships in class ==
Construction data
Ship name	Hull no.	Class/subclass	Builder	Laid down	Launched	Comm.	Decomm.	Fate	Ref.
Brooklyn	CL-40	Brooklyn	Brooklyn Navy Yard, New York City	12 Mar 1935	30 Nov 1936	30 Sep 1937	3 Jan 1947	Transferred to Chilean Navy as O'Higgins, 9 Jan 1951; sank under tow to a scrapyard in 1992	
Philadelphia	CL-41	Brooklyn	Philadelphia Naval Shipyard, Philadelphia	28 May 1935	17 Nov 1936	23 Sep 1937	3 Feb 1947	Transferred to Brazilian Navy as Barroso, 9 Jan 1951; scrapped in 1974	
Savannah	CL-42	Brooklyn	New York Shipbuilding Corporation, Camden	31 May 1934	8 May 1937	10 Mar 1938	3 Feb 1947	Sold for scrap, 6 Jan 1960	
Nashville	CL-43	Brooklyn	New York Shipbuilding Corporation, Camden	24 Jan 1935	2 Oct 1937	6 Jun 1938	24 Jun 1946	Transferred to Chilean Navy as Capitán Prat, 9 Jan 1951; sold for scrap 1983	
Phoenix	CL-46	Brooklyn	New York Shipbuilding Corporation, Camden	25 Apr 1935	19 Mar 1938	3 Oct 1938	3 Jul 1946	Transferred to Argentine Navy as Diecisiete de Octubre, 9 Apr 1951, renamed ARA General Belgrano 1956 Sunk, 2 May 1982, Falklands War	
Boise	CL-47	Brooklyn	Newport News Shipbuilding and Dry Dock Company, Newport News	1 Apr 1935	3 Dec 1936	12 Aug 1938	1 Jul 1946	Transferred to Argentine Navy as Nueve de Julio, 11 Jan 1951; scrapped in 1983	
Honolulu	CL-48	Brooklyn	Brooklyn Navy Yard, New York City	9 Dec 1935	26 Aug 1937	15 Jun 1938	3 Feb 1947	Sold for scrap, 17 Nov 1959	
St. Louis	CL-49	St. Louis	Newport News Shipbuilding and Dry Dock Company	10 Dec 1936	15 Apr 1938	19 May 1939	20 Jun 1946	Transferred to Brazilian Navy as Tamandare, 29 Jan 1951; sank under tow to the scrappers in 1980	
Helena	CL-50	St. Louis	Brooklyn Navy Yard	9 Dec 1936	28 Aug 1938	18 Sep 1939	—N/a	Torpedoed and sunk, 6 Jul 1943	

== Service history ==
=== War service ===
Several Brooklyns were seriously damaged during World War II, although all but one of the cruisers survived. Boise was severely damaged by a shell that hit her forward turret magazine during the Battle of Cape Esperance on 11 October 1942, suffering many casualties, but the magazine (being partially flooded as a result of shell hits in her hull) did not explode. Nashville was hit by a kamikaze attack on 13 December 1944, off Mindoro, which killed or wounded 310 crewmen. Honolulu was torpedoed at the Battle of Kolombangara on 12–13 July 1943, as was her near-sister St. Louis. After being repaired in the United States, Honolulu returned to service only to be torpedoed by a Japanese aircraft on 20 October 1944, during the invasion of Leyte. On 11 September 1943, Savannah was hit by a German Fritz X radio guided bomb which penetrated her #3 turret and blew out the bottom of the ship. Skillful damage control by her crew saved her from sinking. While under repair in the United States, Savannah and Honolulu were rebuilt with a bulged hull that increased their beam by nearly 8 feet (2.4 m) and their 5-inch/25 caliber guns were replaced by four twin 5-inch/38 caliber guns, although the repairs to Savannah were completed too late for her to see frontline action again.

Helena was sunk in 1943 during the Battle of Kula Gulf. The remains of the ship were discovered below the surface of New Georgia Sound by Paul Allen's research ship Petrel in April 2018. St. Louis was seriously damaged twice, but survived the war.

=== Post-war ===
All ships of the class went into reserve in 1946-47. Six were sold to South American countries in the early 1950s, and served for many more years: Brooklyn and Nashville to Chile, St. Louis and Philadelphia to Brazil, and Boise and Phoenix to Argentina. Savannah and Honolulu remained in reserve until struck in 1959. ARA General Belgrano (ex-Phoenix) was torpedoed and sunk by HMS Conqueror during the Falklands War, while O'Higgins (ex-Brooklyn) remained in service with the Chilean Navy until 1992. She sank under tow, on her way to the scrappers, in the mid-Pacific in 1992.

== See also ==
- List of cruisers of the United States Navy
- List of ships of the Second World War
- List of ship classes of the Second World War

== Sources ==
- Ewing, Steve (1984). American Cruisers of World War II. Missoula, Montana: Pictorial Histories Publishing Company. ISBN 0-933126-51-4.
- Fahey, James C. (1945). The Ships and Aircraft of the United States Fleet. New York: Ships and Aircraft.
- Friedman, Norman (1984). U.S. Cruisers: An Illustrated Design History. Annapolis, Maryland: U.S. Naval Institute Press. ISBN 9780870217180.
- Preston, Antony (1980). Cruisers. Englewood Cliffs, New Jersey: Prentice-Hall. ISBN 013-194902-0.
- Silverstone, Paul H. (1968). U.S. Warships of World War II. Garden City, New York: Doubleday & Company.
- Stille, Mark (2016). U.S. Navy Light Cruisers 1941–45. Bloomsbury. ISBN 978-1472811400.
- Whitley, M. J. (1995). Cruisers of World War Two: An International Encyclopedia. London: Arms and Armour Press. ISBN 1-85409-225-1.
