= 6-inch/47-caliber gun =

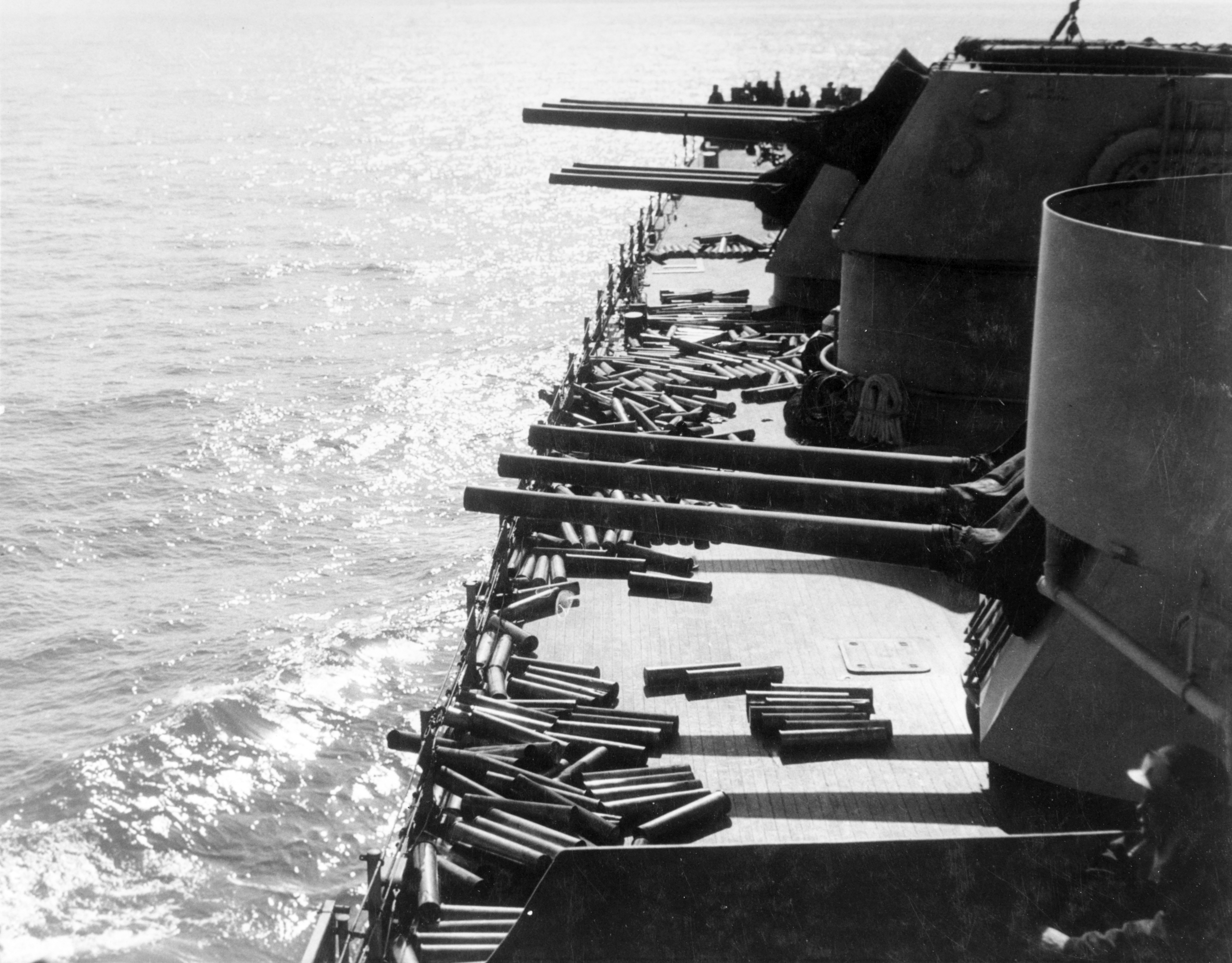
- Three forward turrets and empty cartridge cases on USS Brooklyn (CL-40) after she had bombarded Licata, Sicily, during the early hours of the Allied invasion, 10 July 1943
- Type: Naval gun
- Place of origin: United States

Service history
- In service: 1936–1979 (US service); 1951–1982 (Argentine service); 1951–1973 (Brazilian service); 1951–1992 (Chilean service)
- Used by: United States Navy; Argentine Navy; Brazilian Navy; Chilean Navy
- Wars: World War II; Korean War; Vietnam War; Falklands War

Production history
- Designed: Mark 16: 1932; Mark 16DP: 1943; Mark 17: 1933
- Variants: Mark 16/16DP and Mark 17

Specifications
- Mass: Mark 16/16DP: 6.5 short tons (13,000 lb; 5,897 kg); Mark 17: 5.24 short tons (10,480 lb; 4,754 kg)
- Length: Mark 16/16DP: 300 in (7.6 m) overall length; Mark 17: 289 in (7.3 m) overall length
- Barrel length: 282.3 in (7.17 m) bore (47 calibers)
- Shell: Mark 16: 130 lb (59 kg) armor-piercing Mark 35 (super heavy); 105 lb (48 kg) HC (high capacity) Mark 34/39; Mark 17: 105 lb Common Mark 28
- Caliber: 6 inches (152 mm)
- Recoil: Mark 16/16DP: 21 in (53 cm); Mark 17: 24 in (61 cm)
- Elevation: Mark 16: −5° to +40°, later modified to +60°; Mark 16DP: −5° to +78°; Mark 17: −10° to +20°
- Traverse: −150° to +150° (all variants)
- Rate of fire: Mark 16: 8–10 rounds per minute; Mark 16DP: 12 rounds per minute; Mark 17: 5–8 rounds per minute
- Muzzle velocity: Mark 16/16DP: Full charge; 2,500 ft/s (760 m/s) AP Mark 35; 2,665 ft/s (812 m/s) HC Mark 34; Reduced charge; 2,050 ft/s (620 m/s) AP Mark 35; 2,225 ft/s (678 m/s) HC Mark 34; Mark 17: 2,800 ft/s (850 m/s) Common Mark 28
- Effective firing range: Mark 16/16DP: 20,000-yard (18,288 m) at 22.3° elevation (130-lb AP shell); Mark 17: 19,800-yard (18,105 m) at 20° elevation (105-lb Common shell)
- Maximum firing range: Mark 16/16DP: 26,118-yard (23,882 m) at 47.5° elevation (130-lb AP shell)

The 6-inch/47-caliber Mark 16 gun was used in the main batteries of several pre-war and World War II US Navy light cruisers. They were primarily mounted in triple turrets and used against surface targets. The Mark 16DP gun was a dual-purpose fitting of the Mark 16 for use against aircraft as well as surface ships. It was installed in the postwar Worcester-class light cruisers and the battleship Mississippi, used as an anti-aircraft gunnery training ship.

The Mark 17 gun was a variation of the Mark 16 to use bagged charges; this was only used in the Erie-class gunboat in a single-pedestal mount.

== Design ==
Three versions of this breech-loading rifled naval gun were produced, the 6-inch/47 Mark 16 Mod 0, the 6-inch/47 Mark 16 Mod 1, and 6-inch/47 Mark 17. "6-inch /47" refers to a bore diameter (caliber) of 6 inches (152 mm) and a bore length of 47 calibers (ie 47 × 6 inch; 23 feet 6 inches (7.16 metres). "Mark 16" indicates it is the 16th design in the series of US Navy 6-inch guns. "Mod 0" or "Mod 1" indicates minor modifications to the design, with 0 being the original and 1 being the first modification (which in this case was a tapered liner).

The 6-inch/47-caliber gun was one of several weapons developed by the United States Navy in the 1930s to fire "super-heavy" armor-piercing (AP) projectiles, thus increasing warships' destructive power while complying with the limits on number of guns and ship size by the London Naval Treaty. Compared with the preceding 6-inch/53-caliber gun, the 6-inch/47 Mark 16 fired a 130-pound (59 kg) AP projectile instead of a 105-pound (48 kg) AP projectile.

The guns were mounted in three types of turret.

The Mark 16 was primarily mounted in a triple turret for use against surface targets. All three guns in each turret were mounted in the same sleeve and thus elevated together, but delay coils permitted "split salvos" to be fired; this cured a shell pattern dispersion problem common to many US cruisers of the 1920s and 1930s. The Cleveland-class had 12 guns mounted in four triple turrets. The arrangement in triple turrets on the ships' centerlines allowed the use of all guns in a broadside; the Omaha-class light cruisers of the 1920s also mounted twelve 6-inch/53 guns but could only use eight in a broadside due to eight of the guns being mounted singly in casemates which could only fire to one side of the ships.

The Mark 16DP used a two-gun semi-automatic "dual-purpose" turret, for use against both air and surface targets. They were individually sleeved to allow independent elevation. They were produced in limited numbers late in World War II. The DP turret could fire more quickly and elevate and train faster compared to the "single-purpose" triple turret. The Worcester-class used these mountings. These were not entirely satisfactory, and a triple DP mounting was proposed to replace them, but was cancelled after World War II.

The Mark 16/16DP gun could fire a 130-pound (59 kg) projectile 11.36 mi (18.28 km) at an elevation of 22.3 degrees with a flight time of 44.7 seconds. Maximum range at 44.5 degrees elevation was 14.77 mi (23.77 km) with a flight time of 77.3 seconds. Projectiles varied in weight; an armor-piercing projectile weighed 130 pounds, while a high-capacity (HC) projectile weighed 105 pounds. Ammunition was semi-fixed (the projectile and the powder casing were separate). The full-charge powder case for these guns was the Mark 4 housed in a brass canister and weighed 65 lb (29 kg). The HC projectile could be equipped with mechanical time (MT) or, by late 1942, with variable time (VT) radio proximity fuzes for use against aircraft.

The Mark 34 high-explosive shell this gun fired is usually referred to as "HC", but, when fitted with a proximity (VT) fuse or a mechanical time (MT) fuse, it could be used against aircraft and thus was technically an "AA" projectile in that configuration. Thus the Mark 34 HC is also in theory the Mark 34 AA, depending on the fuse fitted.

Eight to ten rounds per minute could be fired from each of the 6-inch guns. Each gun weighed 6.5 short tons (5.9 t) and could originally only be elevated up to 40 degrees but were later modified to be elevated up to 60 degrees. Originally gun ports in the turret faces were cut to allow only 41 degrees elevation, though during World War II all triple 6-inch/47 gun ports were ordered to be modified to permit the full 60 degrees. The guns could only be loaded at between −5 degrees and +20 degrees elevation; this reduced the rate of fire when engaging distant surface targets or aircraft. The 105-pound Mark 34 HC shell fired at 2,665 ft/s (812 m/s) out to 23,483 yd (21.473 km) at 46.6 degrees; the 130-pound Mark 35 shell introduced just before World War II fired at 2,500 ft/s (760 m/s) at full charge and could penetrate a few inches of armor at its maximum range of 26,000 yd (24 km) at 44.5 degrees.

Gun barrel lives were 750 to 1050 full-charge rounds.

The Mark 17 was used in a single-pedestal Mark 18 mount. The Mark 17 gun could fire a 105-pound (48 kg) Common shell (HE) projectile 19,800 yd (18.1 km) at an elevation of 20 degrees. Ammunition was bagged (the projectile and the powder bag were separate). The full-charge powder bag for these guns weighed 34 or 34.5 lb (15.4 or 15.6 kg). The Erie-class mounted four guns in single-pedestal mounts.

Five to eight rounds per minute could be fired from each of the 6-inch guns. Each gun weighed 5.24 short tons (4.75 t) and could be elevated from −10 degrees up to 20 degrees. The 105-pound Mark 28 Common shell fired at 2,800 ft/s (850 m/s).

Gun barrel lives were 750 to 1050 full-charge rounds.

== Mounts ==
The "Mark 16" designation refers to the gun being 16th in the 6-inch series of designs, not the turret the gun is mounted in. Smaller guns at that time had a Mark number for the type of mounting. In modern times the US Navy refers primarily to the Mark number of the gun mount (turret), but in World War II the model of the gun was the primary reference point. The gun turrets for most 6-inch and larger guns of the 1920s through 1945 were known according to the class of ship the turret was to be mounted on.

A 6-inch triple turret weighed 154–167 short tons (138–149 long tons) in the Brooklyn-class cruisers and 165–173 short tons (147–154 long tons) in the Cleveland-class and Fargo-class cruisers, and each rifle barrel was 25 feet (7.6 m) long. The turret rested on a barbette or circular shaft that extended several decks into the ship. Projectiles were stored in a projectile-handling room in the lower part of the barbette. Two hundred projectiles, per gun, could be stored in the projectile-handling room. The guns were supplied with projectiles via hoists.

Powder stores were below the projectile-handling room and powder hoists fed the guns. Empty powder canisters were ejected from the turret via an ejector port at the back of the turret. When the guns were firing, it was not unusual to see empty brass canisters piling up on the deck behind the turret. The turret itself had 6.5 inches (170 mm) of armor plate on its face and could train (turn) to follow its target at ten degrees a second.

Each turret required a crew of 3 officers and 52 enlisted men.

The Mark 17 guns were installed in the Mark 18 single-pedestal mount that weighed 15.4 short tons (14.0 t).

== Use ==
6-inch/47 variants installation summary
Variant	Ship class	Gun installation	Ships commissioned	In commission
Mark 16	Brooklyn-class	15 (five triple turrets)	9	1937–1992
Mark 16	Cleveland-class	12 (four triple turrets)	27	1942–1979
Mark 16	Fargo-class	12 (four triple turrets)	2	1945–1950
Mark 16DP	USS Mississippi (AG-128)	2 (one twin turret)	1	1946–1956
Mark 16DP	Worcester-class	12 (six twin turrets)	2	1948–1958
Mark 17	Erie-class gunboat	4 (single-pedestal mounts)	2	1936–1945

== Weapons of comparable role, performance and era ==
- BL 6 inch Mk XXIII naval gun : British equivalent light cruiser gun
- 15 cm SK C/25 : German equivalent light cruiser gun but firing a lighter shell at higher velocity
- 15 cm SK C/28 : approximate German equivalent
- 152 mm /55 Italian naval gun Models 1934 and 1936 : approximate Italian equivalent
- 15.5 cm/60 3rd Year Type naval gun : approximate Japanese equivalent
- Bofors 15,2 cm kanon m/42 : Approximate Swedish equivalent

== Surviving examples ==
A surviving example of a Mark 17 6-inch gun is located on board the protected cruiser USS Olympia (C-6). Olympia is a museum ship located at the Independence Seaport Museum in Philadelphia, Pennsylvania.

Today one of the few 6-inch triple gun turrets left in the world is on the museum ship USS Little Rock (CG-4), which is located in the Buffalo and Erie County Naval & Military Park in Buffalo, New York.
