= USS Dayton (CL-105) =

Light cruiser of the United States Navy

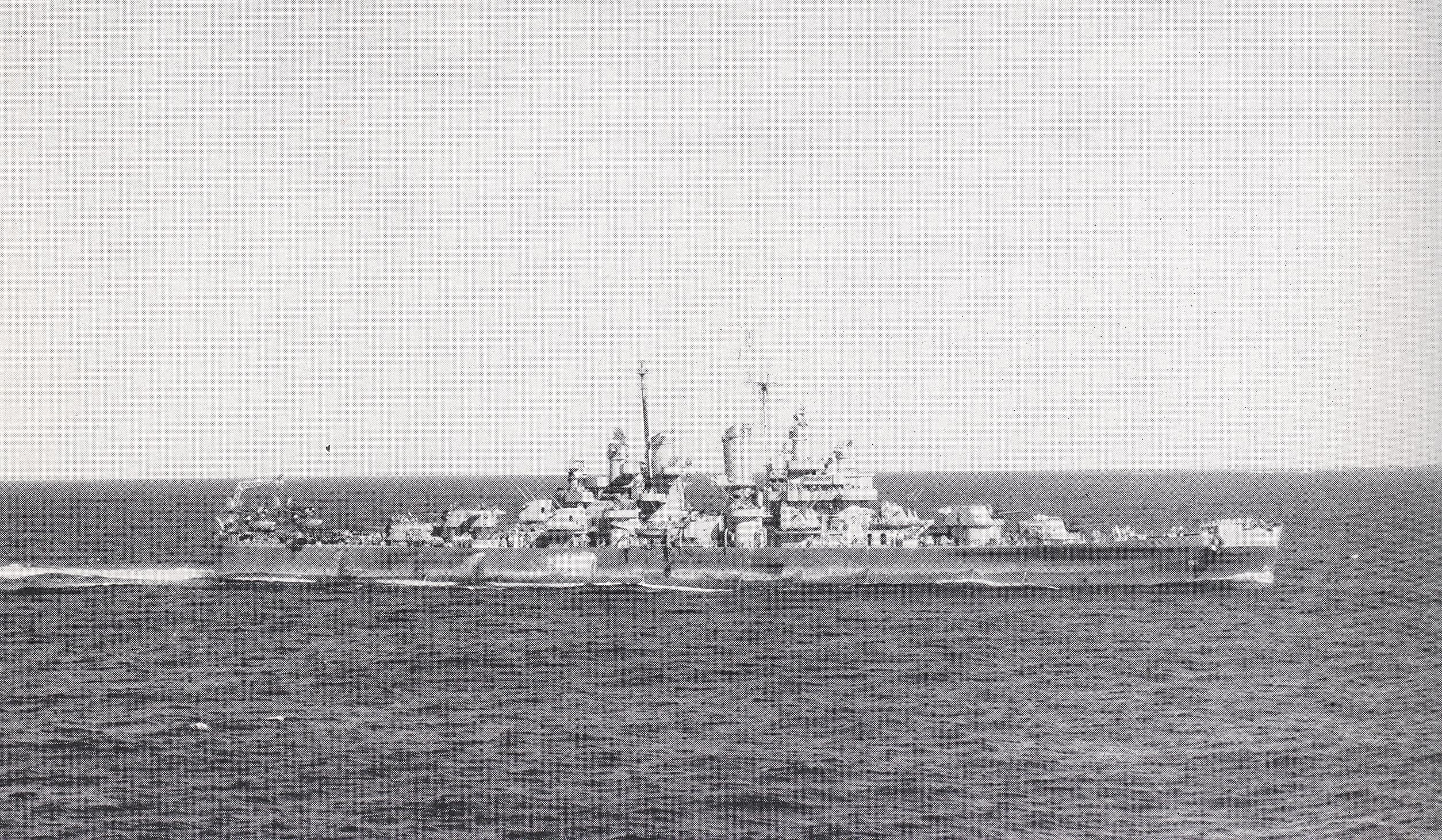
- USS Dayton (CL-105), 1945

History

United States
- Name: Dayton
- Namesake: City of Dayton, Ohio
- Builder: New York Shipbuilding Corporation, Camden, New Jersey
- Laid down: 8 March 1943
- Launched: 19 March 1944
- Commissioned: 7 January 1945
- Decommissioned: 1 March 1949
- Stricken: 1 September 1961
- Fate: Sold for scrap on 6 April 1962

General characteristics
- Class & type: Cleveland-class light cruiser
- Displacement: Standard: 11,744 long tons (11,932 t); Full load: 14,131 long tons (14,358 t)
- Length: 610 ft 1 in (185.95 m)
- Beam: 66 ft 4 in (20.22 m)
- Draft: 24 ft 6 in (7.47 m)
- Installed power: 4 × Babcock & Wilcox boilers; 100,000 shp (75,000 kW)
- Propulsion: 4 × steam turbines; 4 × screw propellers
- Speed: 32.5 knots (60.2 km/h; 37.4 mph)
- Range: 11,000 nmi (20,000 km; 13,000 mi) at 15 kn (28 km/h; 17 mph)
- Complement: 1,285 officers and enlisted
- Armament: 12 × 6 in (152 mm) Mark 16 guns; 12 × 5 in (127 mm)/38 caliber guns; 28 × 40 mm (1.6 in) Bofors anti-aircraft guns; 10 × 20 mm (0.79 in) Oerlikon anti-aircraft guns
- Armor: Belt: 3.5–5 in (89–127 mm); Deck: 2 in (51 mm); Barbettes: 6 in (152 mm); Turrets: 6 in (152 mm); Conning Tower: 5 in (127 mm)
- Aircraft carried: 4 × floatplanes
- Aviation facilities: 2 × stern catapults

USS Dayton (hull number: CL-105) was a Cleveland-class light cruiser of the United States Navy, which were built during World War II. The class was designed as a development of the earlier Brooklyn-class cruisers, the size of which had been limited by the First London Naval Treaty. The start of the war led to the dissolution of the treaty system, but the dramatic need for new vessels precluded a new design, so the Clevelands used the same hull as their predecessors, but were significantly heavier. The Clevelands carried a main battery of twelve 6-inch (152 mm) guns in four three-gun turrets, along with a secondary armament of twelve 5 in (127 mm) dual-purpose guns. They had a top speed of 32.5 knots (60.2 km/h; 37.4 mph).

== Design ==
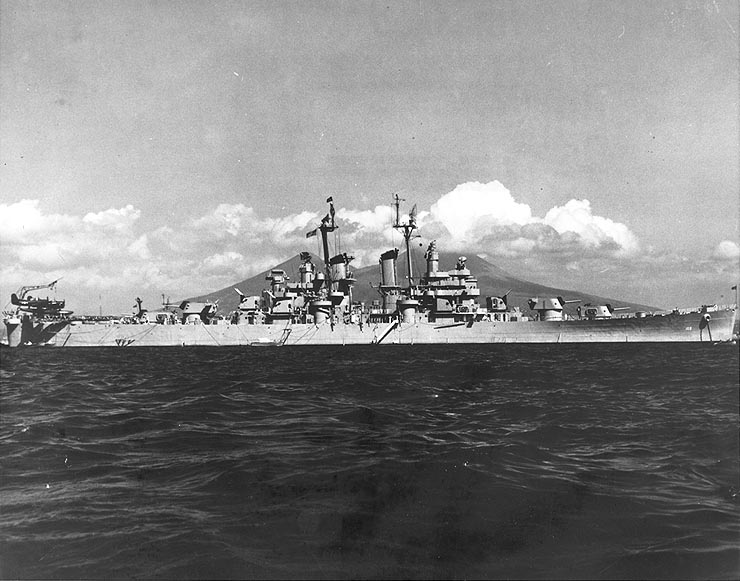
USS Dayton in Naples, fall 1947

The Cleveland-class light cruisers traced their origin to design work done in the late 1930s; at the time, light cruiser displacement was limited to 8,000 long tons (8,100 t) by the Second London Naval Treaty. Following the start of World War II in September 1939, Britain announced it would suspend the treaty for the duration of the conflict, a decision the US Navy quickly followed. Though still neutral, the United States recognized that war was likely and the urgent need for additional ships ruled out an entirely new design, so the Clevelands were a close development of the earlier Brooklyn-class cruisers, the chief difference being the substitution of a two-gun 5 in (127 mm) dual-purpose gun mount for one of the main battery 6 in (152 mm) gun turrets.

Dayton was 610 feet 1 inch (186 m) long overall and had a beam of 66 ft 4 in (20.22 m) and a draft of 24 ft 6 in (7.47 m). Her standard displacement amounted to 11,744 long tons (11,932 t) and increased to 14,131 long tons (14,358 t) at full load. The ship was powered by four General Electric steam turbines, each driving one propeller shaft, using steam provided by four oil-fired Babcock & Wilcox boilers. Rated at 100,000 shaft horsepower (75,000 kW), the turbines were intended to give a top speed of 32.5 knots (60.2 km/h; 37.4 mph). Her crew numbered 1285 officers and enlisted men.

The ship was armed with a main battery of twelve 6 in /47-caliber Mark 16 guns (Note: /47 refers to the length of the gun in terms of calibers. A /47 gun is 47 times long as it is in bore diameter.) in four 3-gun turrets on the centerline. Two were placed forward in a superfiring pair; the other two turrets were placed aft of the superstructure in another superfiring pair. The secondary battery consisted of twelve 5 in (127 mm) /38-caliber dual-purpose guns mounted in twin turrets. Two of these were placed on the centerline, one directly behind the forward main turrets and the other just forward of the aft turrets. Two more were placed abreast of the conning tower and the other pair on either side of the aft superstructure. Anti-aircraft defense consisted of twenty-eight Bofors 40 mm (1.6 in) guns in four quadruple and six double mounts and ten Oerlikon 20 mm (0.79 in) guns in single mounts.

The ship's belt armor ranged in thickness from 3.5 to 5 in (89 to 127 mm), with the thicker section amidships where it protected the ammunition magazines and propulsion machinery spaces. Her deck armor was 2 in (51 mm) thick. The main battery turrets were protected with 6.5 in (170 mm) faces and 3 in (76 mm) sides and tops, and they were supported by barbettes 6 inches thick. Dayton's conning tower had 5-inch sides.

== Service history ==
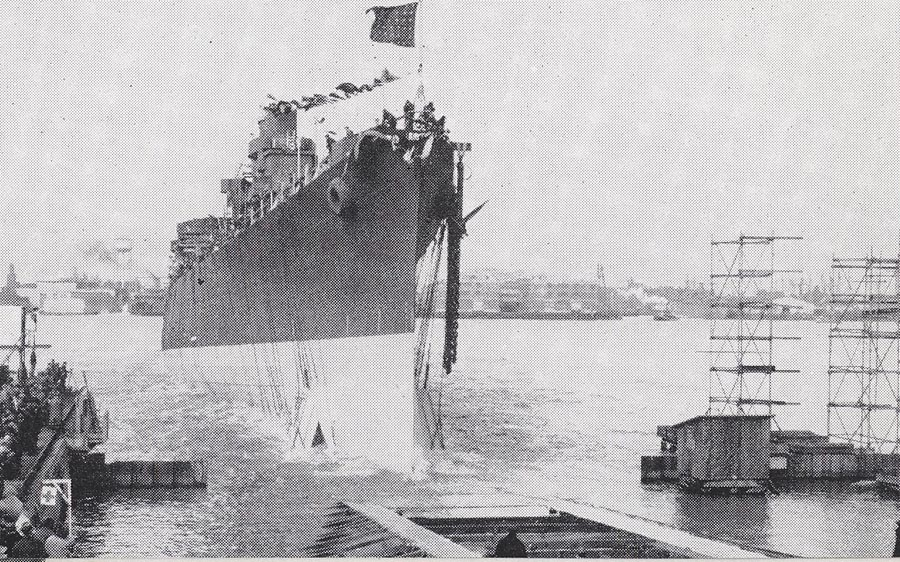
Dayton at her launching in March 1944

The keel for Dayton was laid down at the New York Shipbuilding Corporation, Camden, New Jersey, on 8 March 1943. She was launched on 19 March 1944 and was commissioned for active service on 7 January 1945 with the hull number CL-105. After completing her shakedown cruise, she traveled to the Pacific Ocean, arriving in Pearl Harbor on 15 May. There, she took part in combat training, before getting underway to join the 3rd Fleet for offensive operations against Japanese forces. She reached San Pedro Bay, Leyte, in the Philippines on 16 June. There, she joined Task Force 38, and she was assigned to the subordinate unit Task Group 38.1, along with five aircraft carriers, three fast battleships, four other cruisers, and several destroyers.

Two weeks later, on 1 July, the fleet sortied to carry out a series of air strikes on Japanese targets in the Home Islands. Dayton formed part of the anti-aircraft screen that protected the aircraft carriers during these operations. The attacks began on 7 July and were carried out intermittently over the following eleven days. During this period, on 18 July, Dayton was temporarily transferred to Task Group 35.4, along with the cruisers Topeka, Atlanta, and Duluth and eight destroyers. The unit carried out a sweep for Japanese coastal shipping that night, but failed to locate any significant targets. Dayton thereafter returned to TG 38.1 and remained with it for the next month during the initial occupation operations. The ships entered Sagami Bay on 27 August with the rest of TF 38 to begin preparations for the formal surrender of Japan, which took place aboard the battleship Missouri on 2 September. Dayton entered Tokyo Bay on 10 September as part of the occupation force. She remained there through 7 November, apart from a brief voyage to Eniwetok for periodic maintenance. Dayton left Japan on 7 November and reached San Pedro, California, twelve days later. The ship received one battle star during her short wartime career.

On 24 January 1946, Dayton departed San Pedro for Pearl Harbor, arriving there on the 30th. From there, she got underway bound for Japan, but while still en route on 7 February, she received a change in orders transferring her to the U.S. Atlantic Fleet. She took part in training exercises held off Guantanamo Bay, Cuba, later that year before sailing for her new home port at Norfolk, Virginia. The ship embarked on a tour of the Mediterranean Sea on 3 February 1947. During the cruise, she participated in maneuvers off Malta, visited a series of foreign ports including Istanbul, Turkey, and acted as the flagship of Commander of Naval Forces, Mediterranean. She arrived back in the United States on 30 November, stopping first at Boston. She thereafter took part in training operations held off the coast of New England, operating out of Newport, Rhode Island into 1948. Another voyage to the Mediterranean followed from 9 February to 26 June. Dayton was then decommissioned on 1 March 1949 at Boston. After more than a decade in the reserve fleet, the ship was stricken from the naval register on 1 September 1961 and sold to ship breakers on 6 April 1962.
