= USS Duluth =

Two ships of the United States Navy have been named Duluth, after the city of Duluth, Minnesota.

- USS Duluth (CL-87) was a Cleveland-class light cruiser commissioned late in World War II.
- USS Duluth (LPD-6) was an Austin-class amphibious transport dock commissioned in 1966 and decommissioned in 2005.
