= Misty Picture =

United States explosive test

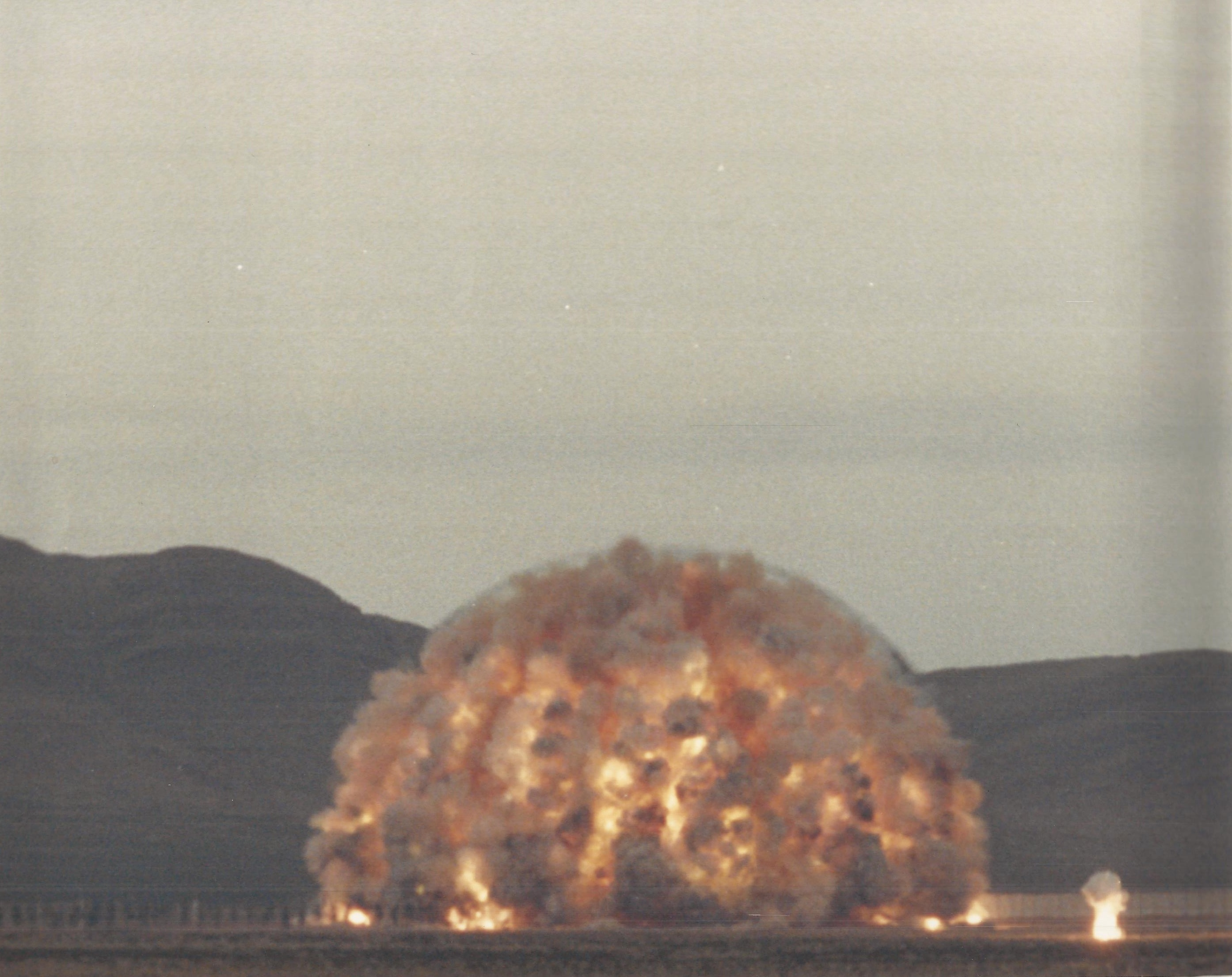

Information
- Country: United States
- Test site: White Sands Missile Range, New Mexico
- Coordinates: 33°37′11.51″N 106°28′26.32″W
- Date: May 14, 1987
- Number of tests: 1
- Agency: Defense Nuclear Agency
- Explosive: ANFO
- Configuration: Segmented hemisphere
- Yield: 3.9 kilotons of TNT (16 TJ)

Test chronology

Misty Picture was a test conducted on May 14, 1987 by the United States Defense Nuclear Agency (now part of the Defense Threat Reduction Agency) involving the detonation of several thousand tons of conventional explosives to simulate the explosion of a small nuclear bomb.

This overall description is taken, nearly verbatim, from the test report:

MISTY PICTURE was the fourth test in the MISTY CASTLE series of large-scale High Explosive (HE) tests sponsored by the Defense Nuclear Agency (DNA). The test was run on 14 May 1987. The explosive consisted of 4685 tons of an Ammonium Nitrate and Fuel Oil (ANFO) mixture loaded in bulk into a 44-foot (13 m) radius fiberglass hemisphere. (This is equivalent to 3900 tons of TNT.) Detonation of this charge provided an airblast and ground motion environment which was used by numerous agencies to collect basic explosive environmental data and to test a variety of systems and equipment in a simulated nuclear environment. The resulting overpressure from the detonation simulated the approximate equivalent airblast of an 8 kiloton (7,900 long tons; 8,800 short tons) nuclear device.

== Objective ==
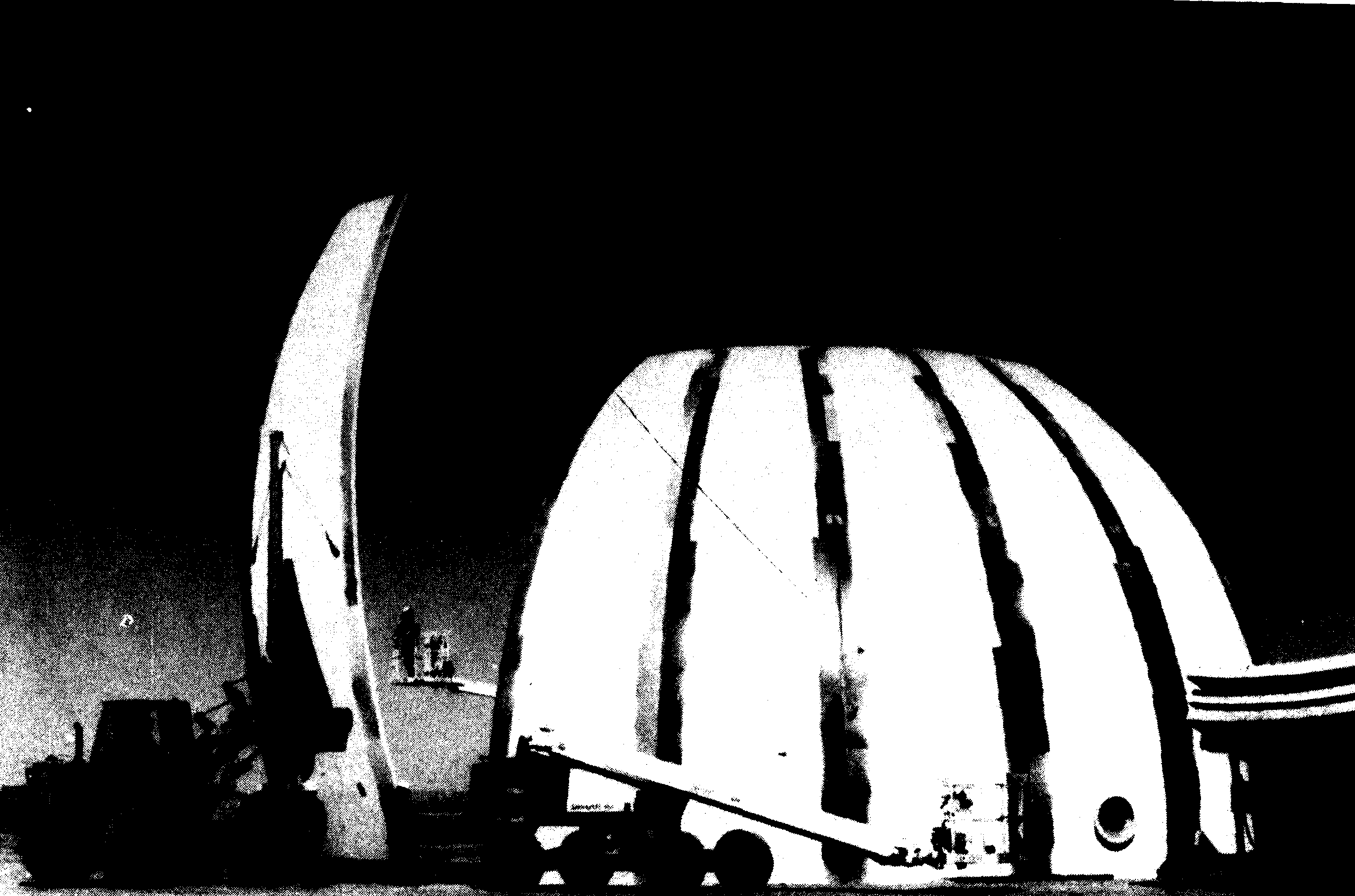
Construction of the fiberglass dome to be filled with explosives for the Misty Picture test

From the introduction to the test report:

MISTY PICTURE was sponsored by the Defense Nuclear Agency (DNA), with Field Command. DNA (FCDNA) being tasked with executing the event. The primary objective of the test is to provide an airblast and ground shock environment for DoD-sponsored experiments. These experiments are designed to determine the response of tactical and strategic weapon systems, communications equipment, vehicles and a variety of structures to a simulated nuclear environment. A secondary objective is to provide a thermal environment (in conjunction with the airblast) for specific experiments. A third objective is to provide a simulated nuclear precursor environment in support of the Air Force Hardened Mobile Launcher (HML) program.

A more detailed description later in the report:

MISTY PICTURE will be a High Explosive (HE) event designed to provide a blast, thermal, and shock environment for the Department of Defense (DOD), U.S. Government Agencies, and foreign governments sponsoring target experiments. For selected experiments, seven Thermal Radiation Sources (TRS) are placed at varying distances from Ground Zero (GZ) to augment the blast and shock environment by providing thermal radiation. The TRS will operate just prior to detonation of the explosive charge. Execution is currently scheduled for 14 May 1987. MISTY PICTURE will detonate 4,880 tons of Ammonium Nitrate Fuel Oil (ANFO) placed at ground level. Test objectives are to:

1. Record blast and shock environment.
2. Record damage to weapons, shelters and systems.
3. Record synergistic effects of blast and thermal environments.
4. Increase weapons effects data base.

In addition to the before mentioned objectives, four Talos/Terrier missiles and 20 Viper rockets will be fired into the dust cloud produced by the MISTY PICTURE detonation during the T+1 minute to T+3 minute time period. The missile payloads are ballistic re-entry vehicles being tested for the effects of dust erosion on their surfaces and trajectories. The rockets are samplers to define the environment that the re-entry vehicles were exposed to.

== Event description ==
The test was conducted at the Permanent High Explosive Test Site (PHETS) on White Sands Missile Range (WSMR), approximately 20 miles (32 km) south of the Northern Range boundary. Ground Zero (GZ) was approximately 500 feet (150 m) south-southeast from the GZ used for the very similar June 1985 Minor Scale event.

Gracon Corporation (Loveland, Colorado) did the helium dispersion into the layer simulating a thermal layer in order to create the shock precursor.

The precursor simulated this environment by providing a two-foot high layer of helium gas contained beneath eight mylar envelopes. [...] Since pressure waves advance faster in helium than in air, the shockwave moved faster in the helium environment and produced a simulated precursor.

== See also ==
- List of the largest artificial non-nuclear explosions
- Operation Sailor Hat
