= High explosive nuclear effects testing =

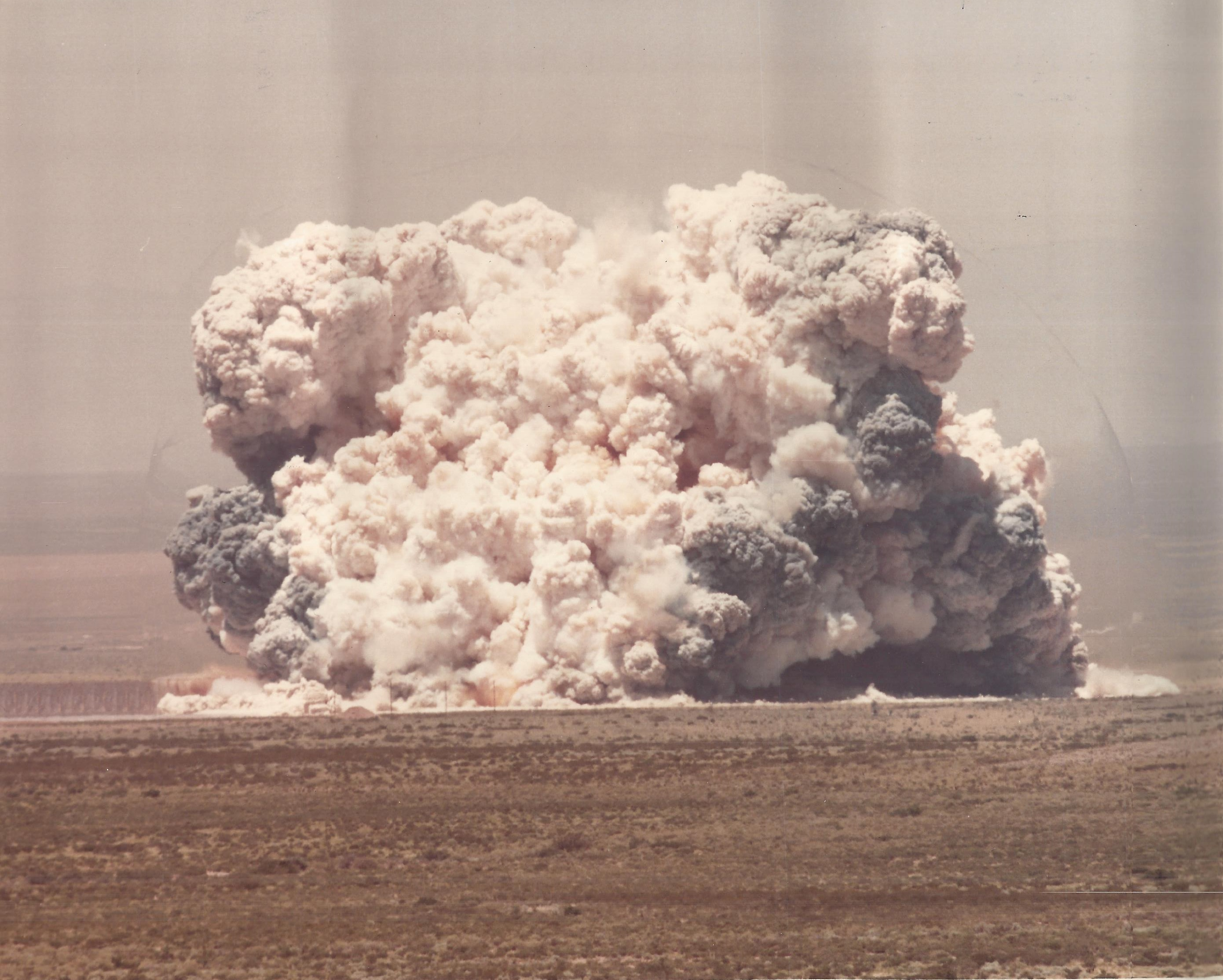
Minor Scale test at the White Sands Missile Range utilized 4880 tons of ANFO to simulate an equivalent airblast of a tactical nuclear weapon.

High explosive nuclear effects testing comprises large scale field tests using conventional high explosives as alternatives to atmospheric nuclear testing.

== Background ==
When the Limited Test Ban Treaty came into effect in 1963, nuclear testing in the atmosphere was prohibited. However, alternatives to atmospheric nuclear testing were required to continue the study of nuclear weapons effects. These would allow obtaining data related to air-blast, ground-shock, structure-response data, bio-medical effects, and other various phenomena. Large scale field tests using conventional high explosives were devised to this end.

== Events ==
The following is a list of such events with yields of more than 1000 pounds.

Name	Series	Date	Test site	Country	Max yield (pounds)	Shots	Explosive	Type	HOB (feet)	Notes
Trinity (100-ton Test on tower)	Trinity	7 May 1945	White Sands Missile Range, New Mexico	United States	216,000	1	TNT, Composition B.	Airburst/Tower	20	Calibration test preceding the first nuclear explosion
Dahlgren	NOL	22 Sept-18 Nov 1952	Dahlgren, Virginia	United States	4,200	28	TNT Mk 7 Depth charge	Underwater	-2.3 to -5.4	Obtain data on the scaling of surface phenomena from shallow underwater explosions and studies of base surge and water formation.
Jangle HE 1–4	Jangle	25 Aug 1951 - 9 Sept 1951	Nevada Test Site, Area 10	United States	40,000	4	TNT	Underground; Surface	0 to -6.9	Scaled predictions for shallow underground and surface nuclear tests. Wave forms, scale and model laws.
Jangle HE 5–10	Jangle	25 Aug 1951 - 9 Sept 1951	Nevada Test Site, Area 5	United States	2,560	6	TNT, Pentolite	Surface	-1 to -3	Base surge and cratering phenomena studies, ground activity differences with pentolite.
Dugway	Underground Explosion Test Program	5 May 1951 - 13 Nov 1951	Dugway Proving Ground, Utah; Unaweep Canyon, Colorado; Buckhorn Wash, Utah	United States	320,000	68	TNT	Underground	-7 to -35	To study the generation and propagation of explosive waves from underground detonations and the effects of these waves on underground structures. To compare cratering in dry sand, clay, wet clay, limestone, granite, and sandstone.
Pacific Proving Ground HE	Pacific Proving Ground	Early 1952	Eniwetok, Eugelab Island	Marshall Islands	40,000	5	R-7-HDA (C2) and R-7-HCA (Tetrytal)	Surface	0	Comparison of saturated coral with Nevada soil.
Mississippi	Waterways Experiment Station	1952	Mississippi River near Vicksburg, Mississippi	United States	2,048	3	TNT	Underwater		Determine effects of a 20-kt nuclear explosion in water depths typical of harbor areas.
Sevier Bridge	NOL	24 Nov 1953	Sevier Bridge Reservoir, Salt Lake City, Utah	United States	90,000	1	TNT Mk 14 Demolition	Underwater	-11.1	Scale the base surge of a high-explosive in shallow water with Test Baker of Operation Crossroads at Bikini.
Cowboy	Plowshare	18 Dec 1959 - 4 Mar 1960	Carey Salt Mine, Winnfield, Louisiana	United States	2,000	15	Pelletol 1	Underground	-45 to -110	Determine whether exploding an HE charge in the center of an underground sphere would produce seismic decoupling of the shock wave.
Suffield 1959	Suffield	27 Jul 1959 - 10 Dec 1959	Suffield Experimental Station, Alberta	Canada	10,000	5	TNT	Surface	0	Compare airblast effectiveness of ground burst cast TNT charges and those made up from a large number of cast blocks of TNT detonated in contact with frozen and unfrozen prairie.
Buckboard	Plowshare	Jun - Sept 1960	Nevada Test Site, Area 10	United States	40,000	13	TNT	Underground	-5 to -60	Cratering tests comparing effects of yield, depth of burst, and surrounding medium. Included study of seismic signals.
Scooter	Plowshare	13 Oct 1960	Nevada Test Site, Area 10, Yucca Flat	United States	1,000,000	1	TNT	Underground	-125	Provide technical and scientific information concerning the mechanics of crater formation by large underground chemical explosions and to relate craters produced by chemical and nuclear explosives. Included observations of ground motion, crater dimensions, throwout distribution, and a clarification of scaling laws.
Stagecoach I, II, III	Plowshare	15-25 Mar 1960	Nevada Test Site, Area 10	United States	40,000	3	TNT	Underground	-17 to -80	Verify and refine apparent departures from cube-root scaling . Tasks included blast geometry, seismic measurements, and throwout distribution, pressure measurements, and other cratering phenomena.
Suffield 1960	Suffield	18 Aug 1960	Suffield Experimental Station, Alberta	Canada	40,000	1	TNT, Tetryol booster	Surface	0	Measure blast effects, including outgoing shock and blast waves and various ground effects.
Edwards AF Base	Edwards AF Base	18 Aug 1960	Edwards Air Force Base, California	United States	10,000	3	TNT	Airburst/Tower	0 - 13.5	Increase the scope and reliability of the scaling factor for damage to military vehicles from sub-kiloton yields.
Blowdown	Dolphin	18 Jul 1963	Iron Range Test Site, Queensland	Australia	100,000	1	TNT	Airburst/Tower	136	Obtain data on tree blowdown and blast effects in a rainforest environment
Snowball	Suffield	17 Jul 1964	Suffield Experimental Station, Alberta	Canada	1,000,000	1	TNT	Surface	0	Instrumentation development, blast, ground shock, electromagnetic and debris measurements as well as biomedical and underground target tests.
Alpha	Sailor Hat	12-14 Nov 1964	San Clemente Island, CA	United States	40,000	2	HBX	Underwater	-200	Test of underwater blast and shock in preparation for larger Sailor Hat tests
Bravo	Sailor Hat	6 Feb 1965	Kahoʻolawe, Hawaii	United States	1,000,000	1	TNT	Surface	0	Effects of high energy airblast loading and underwater shock on surface ships and weapon systems, seaworthiness and mobility.
Charlie	Sailor Hat	16 Apr 1965	Kahoʻolawe, Hawaii	United States	1,000,000	1	TNT	Surface	0	Effects of high energy airblast loading and underwater shock on surface ships and weapon systems, seaworthiness and mobility.
Delta	Sailor Hat	9 Jun 1965	Kahoʻolawe, Hawaii	United States	1,000,000	1	TNT	Surface	0	Effects of high energy airblast loading and underwater shock on surface ships and weapon systems, seaworthiness and mobility.
Minor Scale		27 Jun 1985	White Sands Missile Range, New Mexico	United States	9,488,000	1	ANFO	Surface	0	Effects of high energy blasts on various military hardware, particularly new, blast-hardened launchers for the Midgetman ballistic missile.

== See also ==
- Largest artificial non-nuclear explosions
- List of nuclear weapons tests
