= Operation Blowdown =

Australian test explosion

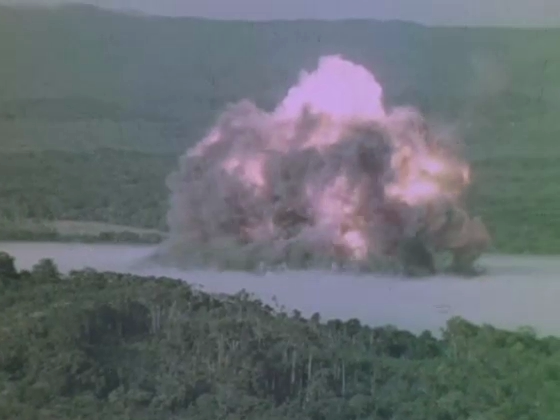
- Detonation of 50 short tons (45 t) of TNT.

Information
- Country: Australia
- Test site: Iron Range Test Site, North Queensland
- Coordinates: 12.749°S 143.2795°E
- Date: 18 July 1963
- Number of tests: 1
- Agency: Australian Army, DASA
- Explosive: TNT
- Configuration: Stacked Sphere, Tower
- Yield: 50 tons of TNT (210 GJ)

Test chronology

Operation Blowdown was an explosives test carried out in the Kutini-Payamu jungle of Australia's Cape York Peninsula in 1963, to simulate the effects of a nuclear weapon on tropical rainforest. It was conducted by the Australian Army, the Department of Supply, and the Defence Standards Laboratory with participation from the United Kingdom, Canada and United States. In addition, blast effects on military material, field fortifications, supply points, and foot and vehicle movement were examined in a rainforest environment.

A spherical charge of 50 short tons (45 t) of TNT was detonated on a tower 136 feet (41 m) above ground level and 69 feet (21 m) above the rainforest canopy. After the explosion, troops were moved through the area (which was now covered in up to a metre of leaf litter), to test their ability to transit across the debris. In addition, obsolete vehicles and equipment left near the centre of the explosion were destroyed.

Although never officially stated, there is speculation that the test intended to determine the feasibility of using nuclear weapons in clearing the jungles of Vietnam, at a time of Australia's increasing involvement in the Vietnam war starting in 1962.

United States participation included the establishment of pressure measurement equipment and the loan of photographic and instrumentation equipment, some of which had been used in the 1962 Project Plowshare.

== Preparations ==
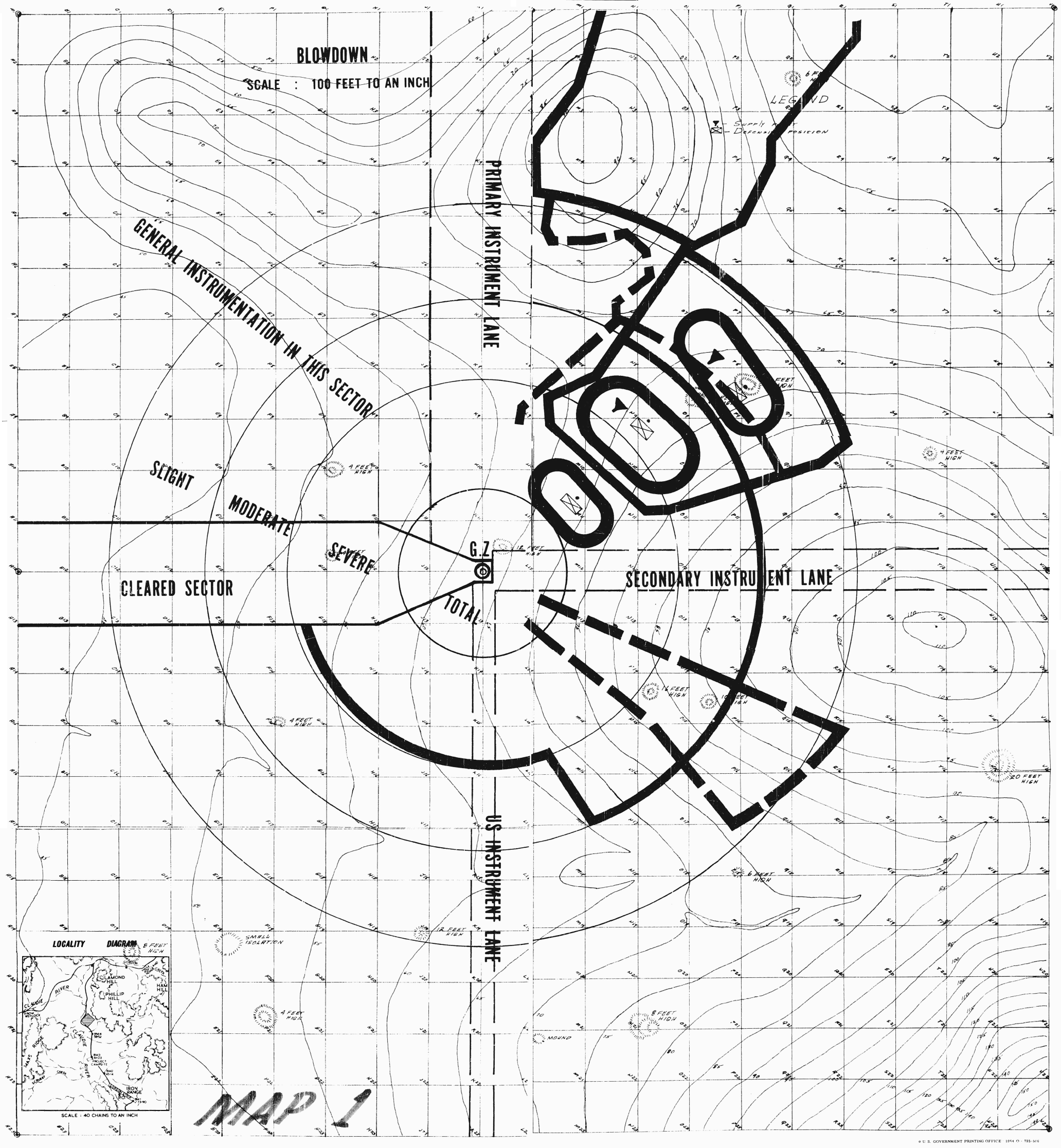
Map of operations that indicates ground zero, severity of destruction areas, instrumentation lanes and placement of objects to test.

The construction of the base camp and test area was provided in part by the 24th Construction Squadron, Royal Australian Engineers. At ground zero, a straight sided tower was constructed to suspend a sphere of TNT charges. The charges were tins of 41 pounds of remelted and cast TNT from 155-mm shells. The final sphere contained a total of 2,438 TNT and 70 CE/TNT booster canisters resting on 408 support blocks with a diameter of approximately 13 feet (4.0 m). Extreme care needed to be taken during construction since damage or air gaps might have caused jetting or deformation of the blast wave.

The section of rainforest selected was typical of North Queensland and contained 70 different tree species of varying sizes. Four lanes centred on the tower were set up with instrumentation and one 200-foot wide lane was cleared of vegetation except for select trees to study the impact with varying distances from ground zero. Furthermore, approximately 17,000 trees were catalogued to determine the effects of the blast. Military equipment including light and heavy weapons, mortar pits, ammunition, trenches, aerial masts, wireless communication equipment and cables were also positioned around the blast site, complete with simulated troops.

== Blast effects ==
At 8:30 am Eastern Australian time, 50 tons of TNT (210 GJ) were detonated flattening a considerable area of the test site. Observers were located on a nearby hill 2 miles (3.2 km) away and 650 feet (200 m) above ground zero. Destruction was total within 250 feet (76 m), severe within 400 feet (120 m) and stopped around 900 feet (270 m). The effects of overpressure are summarized by the following table. For reference, 5.0 psi is enough to destroy city areas while instruments at the blast site recorded 83 psi at approximately 190 feet (58 m). To understand the destructive forces, such an overpressure would correspond to wind speeds greater than 1,000 miles per hour (1,600 km/h), and would be equivalent to a 1.0 megaton blast at 3,000 feet (910 m). This also helps in understanding how a test of 50 tons could be used to evaluate nuclear weapons which may be in the kiloton and megaton ranges by reducing the distance to ground zero for greater effect.

Operation Blowdown Blast Effects
| Distance from GZ (feet) | Damage | Overpressure (psi) | Notes |
|---|---|---|---|
| 0-100 | Total | 320 (predicted, 90 ft) | Trees sheared off or uprooted, deep layer of shattered leaves |
| 100-200 | Severe | 83-188 | All trees down, no limbs, some uprooted |
| 200-350 | Severe | 23-83 | Only smaller trees uprooted, few large trees standing |
| 350-450 | Moderate | 13-23 | Trees defoliated, heavy limb accumulation |
| 450-950 | Light | 3.5-13 | Lessening defoliation and breakage |

== See also ==
- Operation Sailor Hat
- Tunguska event, see images of blown down trees.
- Bush Tucker Man, Les J. Hiddens visits the site in one of his program's episodes. There is little to no evidence of the test but he discusses it briefly.
