= USS Atlanta (CL-104) =

Light cruiser of the United States Navy

Coordinates: 32.8796°N 118.5081°W

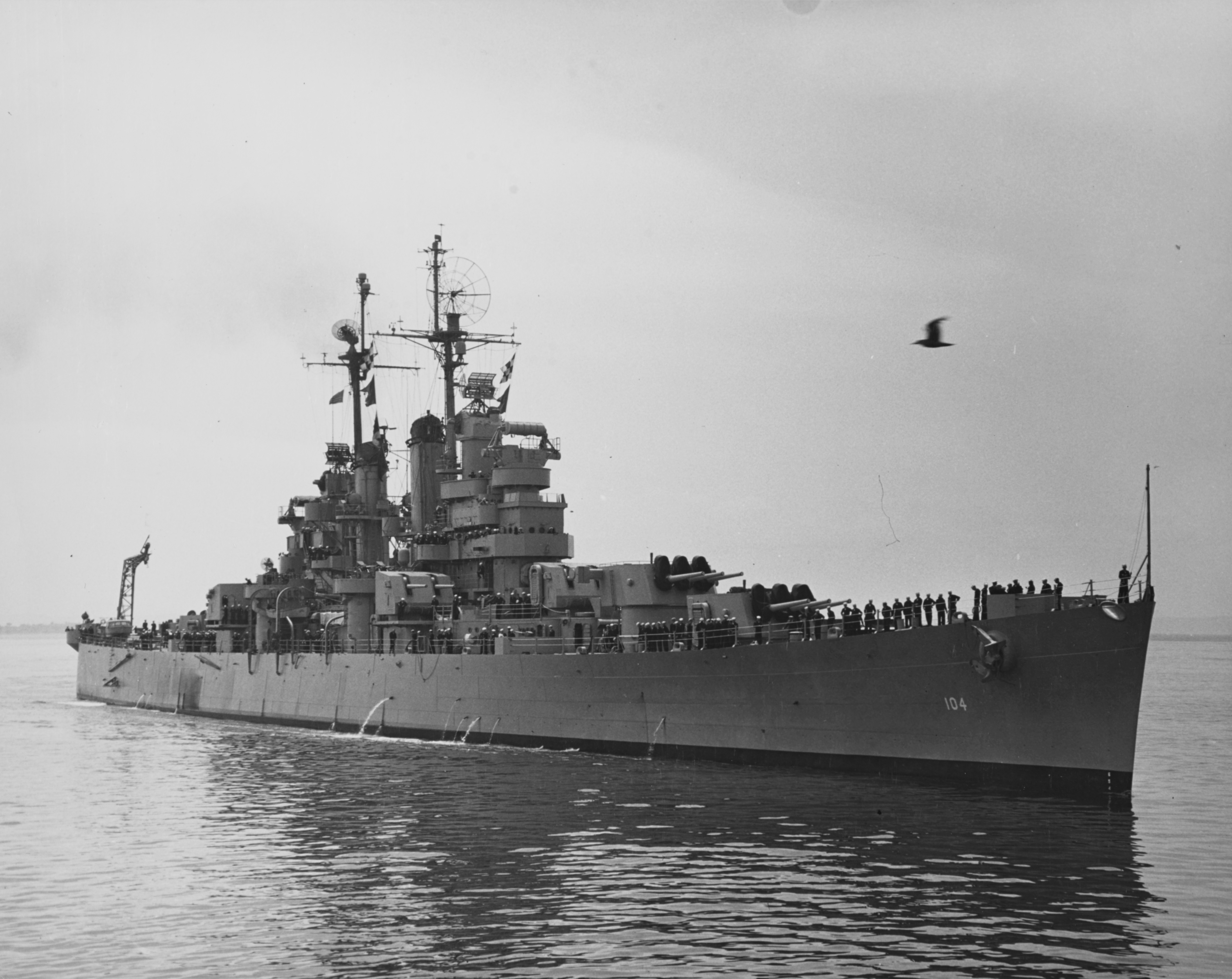
- USS Atlanta, Seattle, June 1948

History

United States
- Name: Atlanta
- Namesake: City of Atlanta, Georgia
- Builder: New York Shipbuilding Corporation, Camden, New Jersey
- Laid down: 25 January 1943
- Launched: 6 February 1944
- Sponsored by: Margaret Mitchell
- Commissioned: 3 December 1944
- Decommissioned: 1 July 1949
- Stricken: 1 October 1962
- Reinstated: 15 May 1964
- Stricken: 1 April 1970
- Fate: Sunk as a target ship, 1 October 1970

General characteristics
- Class & type: Cleveland-class light cruiser
- Displacement: Standard: 11,744 long tons (11,932 t); Full load: 14,131 long tons (14,358 t)
- Length: 610 ft 1 in (185.95 m)
- Beam: 66 ft 4 in (20.22 m)
- Draft: 24 ft 6 in (7.47 m)
- Installed power: 4 × Babcock & Wilcox boilers; 100,000 shp (75,000 kW)
- Propulsion: 4 × steam turbines; 4 × screw propellers
- Speed: 32.5 knots (60.2 km/h; 37.4 mph)
- Range: 11,000 nmi (20,000 km; 13,000 mi) at 15 kn (28 km/h; 17 mph)
- Complement: 1,285 officers and enlisted
- Armament: 12 × 6 in (152 mm) Mark 16 guns; 12 × 5 in (127 mm)/38 caliber guns; 28 × 40 mm (1.6 in) Bofors anti-aircraft guns; 10 × 20 mm (0.79 in) Oerlikon anti-aircraft guns
- Armor: Belt: 3.5–5 in (89–127 mm); Deck: 2 in (51 mm); Barbettes: 6 in (152 mm); Turrets: 6 in (152 mm); Conning Tower: 5 in (127 mm)
- Aircraft carried: 4 × floatplanes
- Aviation facilities: 2 × stern catapults

USS Atlanta (hull number: CL-104) was a Cleveland-class light cruiser of the United States Navy, which were built during World War II. The class was designed as a development of the earlier Brooklyn-class cruisers, the size of which had been limited by the First London Naval Treaty. The start of the war led to the dissolution of the treaty system, but the dramatic need for new vessels precluded a new design, so the Clevelands used the same hull as their predecessors, but were significantly heavier. The Clevelands carried a main battery of twelve 6-inch (152 mm) guns in four three-gun turrets, along with a secondary armament of twelve 5 in (127 mm) dual-purpose guns. They had a top speed of 32.5 knots (60.2 km/h; 37.4 mph).

The ship was laid down on 25 January 1943 at Camden, New Jersey, by the New York Shipbuilding Corporation, launched on 6 February 1944, sponsored by Margaret Mitchell (author of Gone with the Wind, who also sponsored the previous USS Atlanta), and commissioned on 3 December 1944, Captain B. H. Colyear in command.

== Design ==
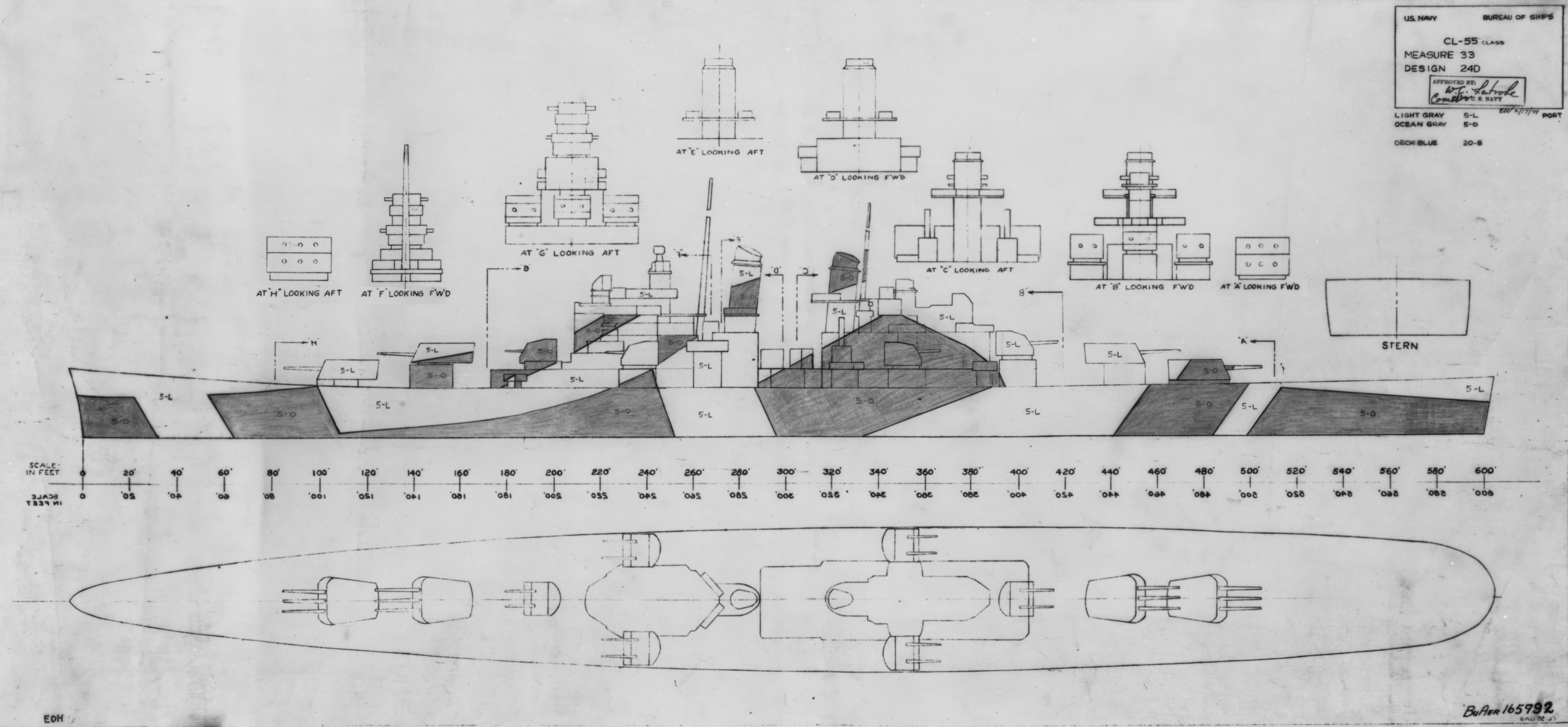
Depiction of the Cleveland class, showing the plan and profile

The Cleveland-class light cruisers traced their origin to design work done in the late 1930s; at the time, light cruiser displacement was limited to 8,000 long tons (8,100 t) by the Second London Naval Treaty. Following the start of World War II in September 1939, Britain announced it would suspend the treaty for the duration of the conflict, a decision the US Navy quickly followed. Though still neutral, the United States recognized that war was likely and the urgent need for additional ships ruled out an entirely new design, so the Clevelands were a close development of the earlier Brooklyn-class cruisers, the chief difference being the substitution of a two-gun 5 in (127 mm) dual-purpose gun mount for one of the main battery 6 in (152 mm) gun turrets.

Atlanta was 610 feet 1 inch (186 m) long overall and had a beam of 66 ft 4 in (20.22 m) and a draft of 24 ft 6 in (7.47 m). Her standard displacement amounted to 11,744 long tons (11,932 t) and increased to 14,131 long tons (14,358 t) at full load. The ship was powered by four General Electric steam turbines, each driving one propeller shaft, using steam provided by four oil-fired Babcock & Wilcox boilers. Rated at 100,000 shaft horsepower (75,000 kW), the turbines were intended to give a top speed of 32.5 knots (60.2 km/h; 37.4 mph). Her crew numbered 1285 officers and enlisted men.

The ship was armed with a main battery of twelve 6 in /47-caliber Mark 16 guns (Note: /47 refers to the length of the gun in terms of calibers. A /47 gun is 47 times long as it is in bore diameter.) in four 3-gun turrets on the centerline. Two were placed forward in a superfiring pair; the other two turrets were placed aft of the superstructure in another superfiring pair. The secondary battery consisted of twelve 5 in (127 mm) /38-caliber dual-purpose guns mounted in twin turrets. Two of these were placed on the centerline, one directly behind the forward main turrets and the other just forward of the aft turrets. Two more were placed abreast of the conning tower and the other pair on either side of the aft superstructure. Anti-aircraft defense consisted of twenty-eight Bofors 40 mm (1.6 in) guns in four quadruple and six double mounts and ten Oerlikon 20 mm (0.79 in) guns in single mounts.

The ship's belt armor ranged in thickness from 3.5 to 5 in (89 to 127 mm), with the thicker section amidships where it protected the ammunition magazines and propulsion machinery spaces. Her deck armor was 2 in (51 mm) thick. The main battery turrets were protected with 6.5 in (170 mm) faces and 3 in (76 mm) sides and tops, and they were supported by barbettes 6 inches thick. Atlanta's conning tower had 5-inch sides.

== Service history ==
=== Construction and World War II ===
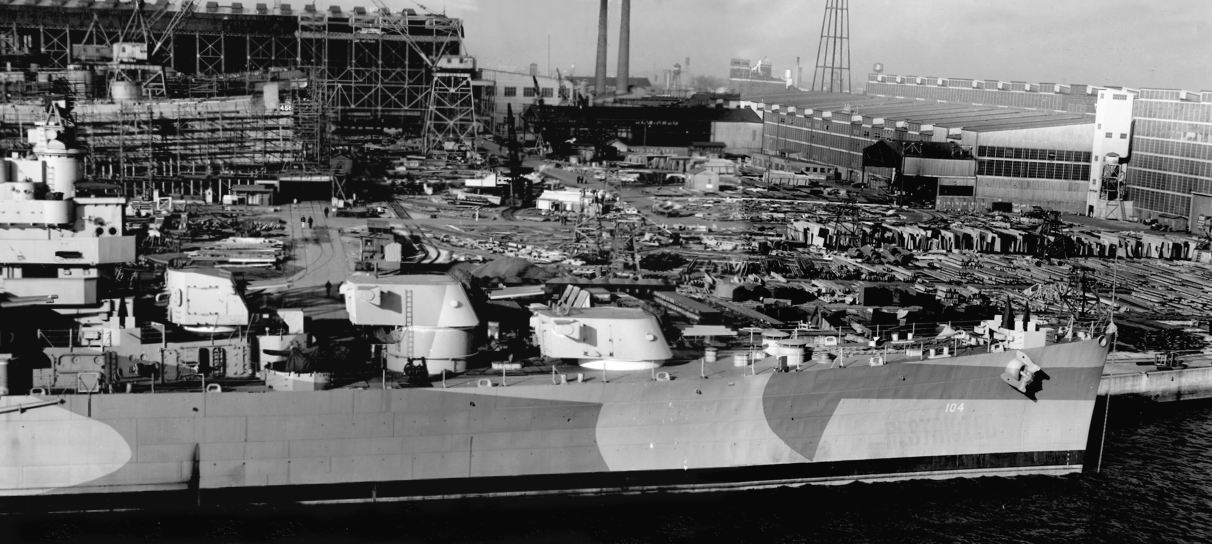
Atlanta during fitting out in November 1944

Atlanta was laid down at the New York Shipbuilding Corporation in Camden, New Jersey, on 25 January 1943. She was launched 6 February 1944, and at the launching ceremony, she was christened by Margaret Mitchell, the author of Gone with the Wind. The ship was commissioned on 3 December that year with the hull number CL-104. Atlanta embarked on a shakedown cruise on 5 January 1945 in Chesapeake Bay and later south to the Caribbean Sea. She concluded her initial training cruise at Norfolk, Virginia, on 14 February. She then sailed north to Philadelphia for maintenance before departing on 27 March to join the US fleet in the Pacific. Atlanta passed through Guantánamo Bay, Cuba, while en route, transited the Panama Canal, and arrived in Pearl Harbor on 18 April. She carried out training exercises in the area through 1 May, before departing on 12 May to join Task Force 58 at Ulithi.

Atlanta served in the defensive screen for the task force's aircraft carriers, which operated off Okinawa from 22 to 27 May; the carriers repeatedly struck Japanese positions in the area to prepare for the imminent invasion of Okinawa. While cruising at sea on 5 June, the fleet was struck by a major typhoon that damaged most of the ships, including Atlanta. Atlanta was detached on 13 June and sent to San Pedro Bay in the Philippines for periodic maintenance. She arrived there the following day, and the work lasted through the end of the month. She got underway on 1 July to rejoin the task force, which had by that time passed to 3rd Fleet and had been re-numbered as Task Force 38. Atlanta was assigned to the subordinate unit, Task Group 38.1, once again serving in the screen for the carriers. At that time, the unit consisted five carriers, three fast battleships, four other cruisers, and several destroyers. The carriers conducted a series of strikes on the Japanese Home Islands over the following weeks, and Atlanta took part in several shore bombardments during this period.

On 18 July, Atlanta was temporarily transferred to Task Group 35.4, along with the cruisers Topeka, Dayton, and Duluth and eight destroyers. The unit carried out a sweep for Japanese coastal shipping that night, but failed to locate any significant targets. By mid-August, Atlanta was patrolling off the coast of Honshū when Japan announced on the 15th that it would surrender. Atlanta entered Sagami Bay on 27 August with the rest of TF 38 to begin preparations for the formal surrender of Japan, which took place aboard the battleship Missouri on 2 September. Atlanta moved to Tokyo Bay on 16 September during the initial occupation of Japan. On 30 September, she departed to return to the United States with more than 500 passengers. The ship passed through Guam on the way to Seattle, Washington, arriving there on 24 October. From there, she steamed south to Terminal Island, California, for extensive maintenance. The ship earned two battle stars during her short wartime career.

=== Post-War ===
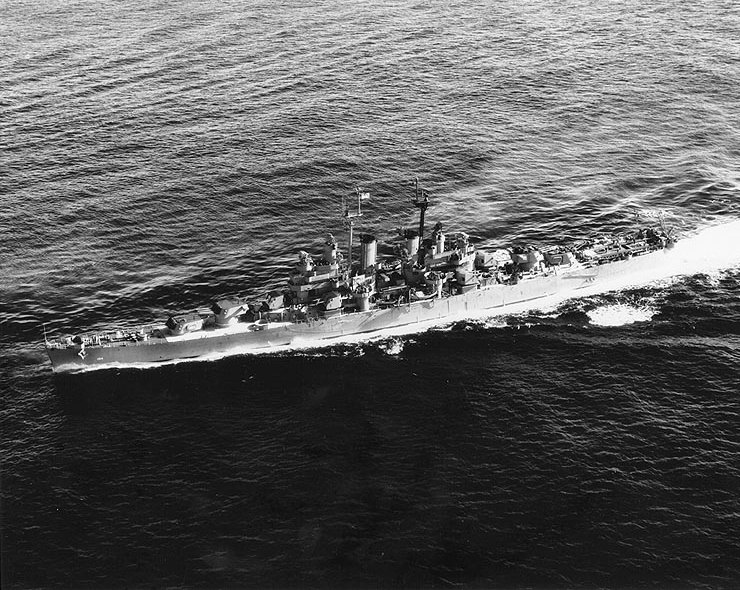
Atlanta on the way to Australia in 1947

On 3 January 1946, Atlanta departed California, bound for Sasebo, Japan. Over the following six months, she toured the Far East, visiting a number of ports including Manila, Philippines; Qingdao and Shanghai, China; Okinawa, Nagasaki, Kagoshima, and Yokosuka, Japan; and Saipan in the Mariana Islands. The ship returned to the San Pedro, California, on 27 June by way of Guam. She was moved to the San Francisco Naval Shipyard two days later for an overhaul. She got underway again on 8 October to conduct sea trials out of San Diego, California. Atlanta operated off California into February 1947, until she departed on the 23rd to take part in training exercises held off Hawaii. She thereafter joined Task Force 38 to visit Australia, departing Pearl Harbor on 1 May. The ships had a lengthy stay in Sydney, Australia, before departing on 27 May to return home. They stopped at Guadalcanal, Tulagi, and Guam on the way back to San Pedro, which they reached on 28 July.

Atlanta participated in a series of exercises held off California over the following weeks. On 28 September, she returned to Pearl Harbor in preparation for another tour of East Asia. The ship visited Yokosuka and Qingdao again, and also made stops in Keelung, China, Hong Kong, and Singapore. She departed the Far East on 27 April 1948, stopping in Kwajalein in the Marshall Islands and Pearl Harbor on the way back to San Diego, arriving on 19 May. Atlanta thereafter resumed training maneuvers off San Diego, which included a cruise north to Juneau, Alaska, which lasted from 29 June to 6 July. Six days later, she stopped in Seattle for a lengthy overhaul. On 20 November, she departed for San Diego for another round of exercises. The ship embarked a contingent of naval reservists in early February 1949 for short training cruises between San Diego and San Francisco. On 1 March, the ship moved to the Mare Island Naval Shipyard to be readied for transfer to the reserve fleet. The ship was decommissioned on 1 July and assigned to the Pacific Reserve Fleet. Atlanta was struck from the Naval Vessel Register on 1 October 1962.

The Navy decided to use Atlanta as a weapons testing ship, rather than simply break her up. She was moved to the San Francisco Naval Shipyard to be extensively rebuilt. Her upper deck and existing superstructure were removed and several experimental structures were installed; these were intended to be fitted to the next generation of guided-missile destroyers and frigates. Atlanta would be used to test the resistance of these structures to explosions of various types. She was reinstated to the Naval Vessel Register on 15 May 1964 with the hull number IX-304. The ship was subjected to three tests in early 1965, designated Operation Sailor Hat, which damaged the ship but did not sink her. She was subsequently laid up in Stockton, California in late 1965 and remained there for the next five years. She was struck from the register again on 1 April 1970 and expended as a target ship off San Clemente Island on 1 October.
