= Minor Scale =

Explosives detonation test in 1985

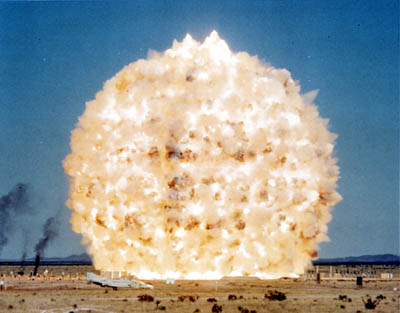
- Minor Scale fireball immediately after detonation. The F-4 Phantom aircraft in the foreground is 63 feet (19 m) long.

Information
- Country: United States
- Test site: White Sands Missile Range, New Mexico
- Coordinates: 33.6210°N 106.4746°W
- Date: June 27, 1985
- Number of tests: 1
- Agency: Defense Nuclear Agency
- Explosive: ANFO
- Configuration: Segmented hemisphere
- Yield: 4 kilotons of TNT (17 TJ)

Test chronology

Minor Scale was a test conducted on June 27, 1985, by the United States Defense Nuclear Agency (now part of the Defense Threat Reduction Agency) involving the detonation of several thousand tons of conventional explosives to simulate the explosion of a small nuclear bomb.

== Test ==
The purpose of the test was to evaluate the effect of nuclear blasts on various pieces of military hardware, particularly new, blast-hardened launchers for the MGM-134 Midgetman ballistic missile.

The test took place at the Permanent High Explosive Testing Grounds of the White Sands Missile Range in the state of New Mexico, for which 4,744 tons of ANFO explosive (ammonium nitrate and fuel oil), equivalent to 4 kilotons of TNT, were used to roughly simulate the effect of an eight kiloton air-burst nuclear device. With a total energy release of about 17 TJ (or 4.2 kilotons of TNT equivalent), Minor Scale was reported as "the largest planned conventional explosion in the history of the free world", surpassing another large conventional explosion, the "British Bang" disposal of ordnance on Heligoland in 1947, reported to have released 13 TJ of energy (about 3.2 kilotons of TNT equivalent).

The Q&A released as part of the effort states: "Future tests are not expected to get bigger than Minor Scale", and in particular, "There are no plans for a test called Major Scale".

== See also ==
- High explosive nuclear effects testing, list of non-nuclear explosives tests
- Misty Picture, a similar test
- Operation Sailor Hat, a similar test that evaluated the effects of nuclear blasts on naval vessels
