= USS Duluth (CL-87) =

Light cruiser of the United States Navy

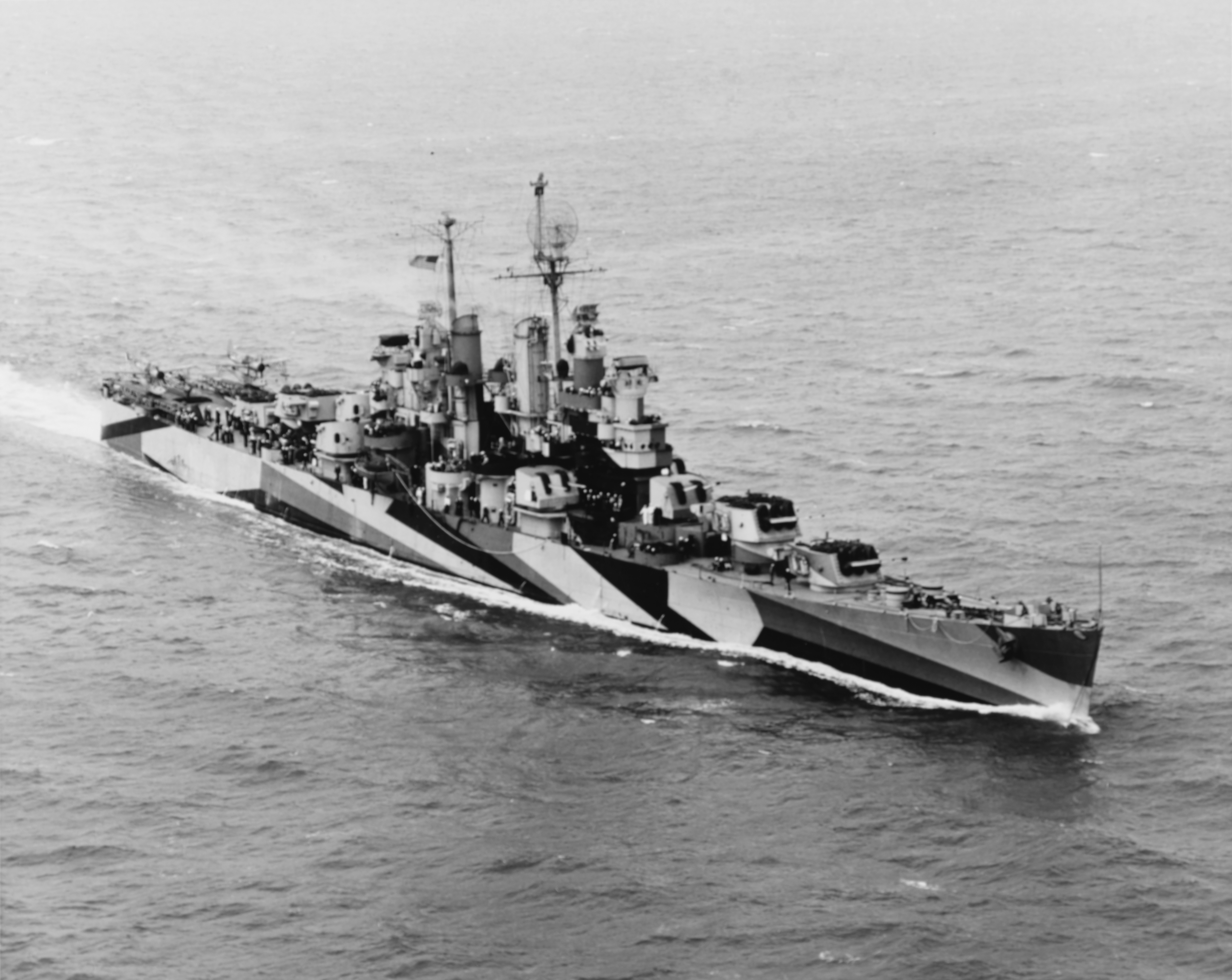
- USS Duluth (CL-87), near Hampton Roads, October 1944

History

United States
- Name: Duluth
- Namesake: City of Duluth, Minnesota
- Builder: Newport News Shipbuilding & Dry Dock Company, Newport News, Virginia
- Laid down: November 1942
- Launched: 13 January 1944
- Commissioned: 18 September 1944
- Decommissioned: 25 June 1949
- Fate: Sold for scrap on 14 November 1960

General characteristics
- Class & type: Cleveland-class light cruiser
- Displacement: Standard: 11,744 long tons (11,932 t); Full load: 14,131 long tons (14,358 t)
- Length: 610 ft 1 in (185.95 m)
- Beam: 66 ft 4 in (20.22 m)
- Draft: 24 ft 6 in (7.47 m)
- Installed power: 4 × Babcock & Wilcox boilers; 100,000 shp (75,000 kW)
- Propulsion: 4 × steam turbines; 4 × screw propellers
- Speed: 32.5 knots (60.2 km/h; 37.4 mph)
- Range: 11,000 nmi (20,000 km; 13,000 mi) at 15 kn (28 km/h; 17 mph)
- Complement: 1,285 officers and enlisted
- Armament: 12 × 6 in (152 mm) Mark 16 guns; 12 × 5 in (127 mm)/38 caliber guns; 28 × 40 mm (1.6 in) Bofors anti-aircraft guns; 10 × 20 mm (0.79 in) Oerlikon anti-aircraft guns
- Armor: Belt: 3.5–5 in (89–127 mm); Deck: 2 in (51 mm); Barbettes: 6 in (152 mm); Turrets: 6 in (152 mm); Conning Tower: 5 in (127 mm)
- Aircraft carried: 4 × floatplanes
- Aviation facilities: 2 × stern catapults

USS Duluth (hull number: CL-87) was a Cleveland-class light cruiser of the United States Navy, which were built during World War II. The class was designed as a development of the earlier Brooklyn-class cruisers, the size of which had been limited by the First London Naval Treaty. The start of the war led to the dissolution of the treaty system, but the dramatic need for new vessels precluded a new design, so the Clevelands used the same hull as their predecessors, but were significantly heavier. The Clevelands carried a main battery of twelve 6-inch (152 mm) guns in four three-gun turrets, along with a secondary armament of twelve 5 in (127 mm) dual-purpose guns. They had a top speed of 32.5 knots (60.2 km/h; 37.4 mph).

She was launched 13 January 1944 by Newport News Shipbuilding & Dry Dock Company, Newport News, Virginia; sponsored by Mrs. E. H. Hatch, wife of the Mayor of Duluth, Minnesota; and commissioned 18 September 1944, Captain Donald Roderick Osborn, Jr., US Naval Academy class of 1920, in command.

== Design ==
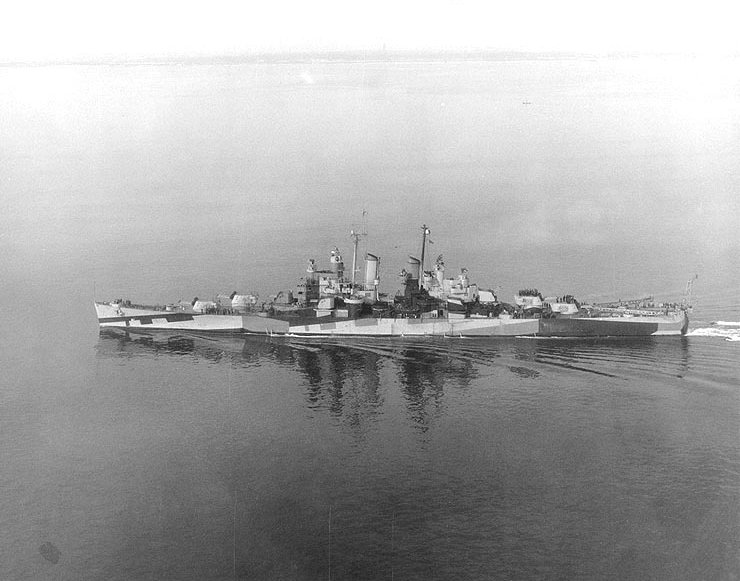
Duluth underway early in her career

The Cleveland-class light cruisers traced their origin to design work done in the late 1930s; at the time, light cruiser displacement was limited to 8,000 long tons (8,100 t) by the Second London Naval Treaty. Following the start of World War II in September 1939, Britain announced it would suspend the treaty for the duration of the conflict, a decision the US Navy quickly followed. Though still neutral, the United States recognized that war was likely and the urgent need for additional ships ruled out an entirely new design, so the Clevelands were a close development of the earlier Brooklyn-class cruisers, the chief difference being the substitution of a two-gun 5 in (127 mm) dual-purpose gun mount for one of the main battery 6 in (152 mm) gun turrets.

Duluth was 610 feet 1 inch (186 m) long overall and had a beam of 66 ft 4 in (20.22 m) and a draft of 24 ft 6 in (7.47 m). Her standard displacement amounted to 11,744 long tons (11,932 t) and increased to 14,131 long tons (14,358 t) at full load. The ship was powered by four General Electric steam turbines, each driving one propeller shaft, using steam provided by four oil-fired Babcock & Wilcox boilers. Rated at 100,000 shaft horsepower (75,000 kW), the turbines were intended to give a top speed of 32.5 knots (60.2 km/h; 37.4 mph). Her crew numbered 1285 officers and enlisted men.

The ship was armed with a main battery of twelve 6 in /47-caliber Mark 16 guns (Note: /47 refers to the length of the gun in terms of calibers. A /47 gun is 47 times long as it is in bore diameter.) in four 3-gun turrets on the centerline. Two were placed forward in a superfiring pair; the other two turrets were placed aft of the superstructure in another superfiring pair. The secondary battery consisted of twelve 5 in (127 mm) /38-caliber dual-purpose guns mounted in twin turrets. Two of these were placed on the centerline, one directly behind the forward main turrets and the other just forward of the aft turrets. Two more were placed abreast of the conning tower and the other pair on either side of the aft superstructure. Anti-aircraft defense consisted of twenty-eight Bofors 40 mm (1.6 in) guns in four quadruple and six double mounts and ten Oerlikon 20 mm (0.79 in) guns in single mounts.

The ship's belt armor ranged in thickness from 3.5 to 5 in (89 to 127 mm), with the thicker section amidships where it protected the ammunition magazines and propulsion machinery spaces. Her deck armor was 2 in (51 mm) thick. The main battery turrets were protected with 6.5 in (170 mm) faces and 3 in (76 mm) sides and tops, and they were supported by barbettes 6 inches thick. Duluth's conning tower had 5-inch sides.

== Service history ==
=== Construction and World War II ===
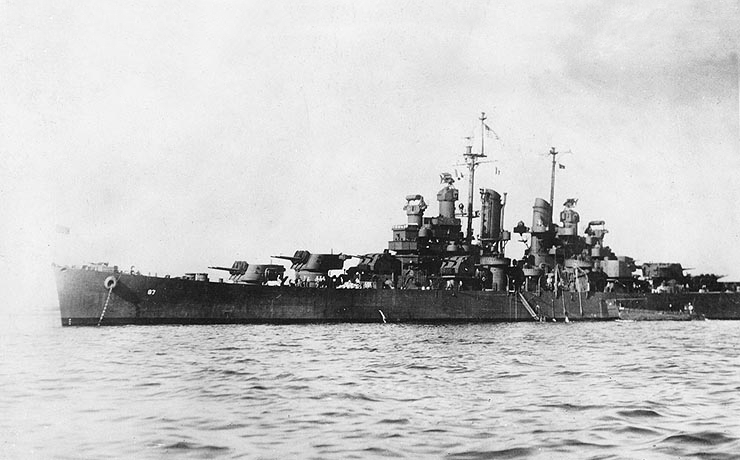
Duluth at anchor in 1945

The keel for Duluth was laid down in November 1942 at the Newport News Shipbuilding & Dry Dock Company in Newport News, Virginia, with the hull number CL-87. Her completed hull was launched on 13 January 1944, and fitting-out work was completed by September. The ship was commissioned on 18 September and thereafter began sea trials. Duluth operated as a training cruiser based in Newport, Rhode Island, from 14 December to 2 March 1945 as her crew familiarized themselves with the ship. She thereafter steamed to Norfolk, Virginia, for a short refit. On 7 April, Duluth got underway to join the war effort in the Pacific. After transiting the Panama Canal, she arrived in Pearl Harbor on 29 April.

Duluth left Pearl Harbor on 8 May to join 5th Fleet, which she met on 27 May. While cruising with the fleet off Okinawa on 5 June, Duluth was damaged by a severe typhoon, along with a number of other vessels. She had to sail south to Guam for repairs, which lasted for more than a month. She returned to the Fast Carrier Task Force on 21 July, which had by that time passed to 3rd Fleet, being renamed Task Force 38. Duluth was assigned to the subordinate unit Task Group 38.1, along with five aircraft carriers, three fast battleships, four other cruisers, and several destroyers. She served as part of the anti-aircraft screen that protected the carriers as they carried out a series of air strikes on various targets in Japan. These operations continued until the end of the war on 14 August.

During this period, on 18 July, Duluth was temporarily transferred to Task Group 35.4, along with the cruisers Topeka, Atlanta, and Dayton and eight destroyers. The unit carried out a sweep for Japanese coastal shipping that night, but failed to locate any significant targets. Duluth thereafter returned to TG 38.1 and remained with it for the next month during the initial occupation operations. The ships entered Sagami Bay on 27 August with the rest of TF 38 to begin preparations for the formal surrender of Japan, which took place aboard the battleship Missouri on 2 September. Duluth moved to Tokyo Bay on 16 September as part of the occupation effort. The ship got underway on 1 October to return home, arriving in Seattle, Washington, on 19 October, where she took part in Navy Day celebrations. The ship received two battle stars during her brief service during the war.

=== Postwar career ===
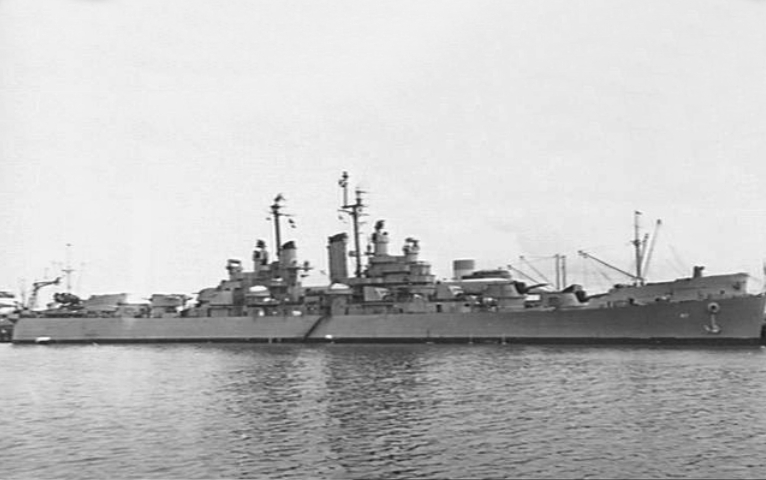
Duluth in Melbourne in 1947

The ship was thereafter based in San Pedro, California, and was sent on a deployment to East Asian waters that lasted from 3 January 1946 to 27 September. The ship sailed to Pearl Harbor on 24 February 1947 for a lengthy visit to the port. Duluth went on a major cruise to the southern and western Pacific between May and July. During the voyage, she visited Melbourne and Sydney, Australia; Truk and Guam in the central Pacific, and Manila in the Philippines. During the latter visit, Duluth cruised with the aircraft carrier Antietam and a division of destroyers, and it was timed for the first anniversary of the Philippines' independence.

The ship was then sent to the coast of China to patrol the region during the Chinese Civil War. Her deployment lasted from 22 September 1947 to 19 May 1948, which concluded when she transferred to Long Beach, California, where she was based for the remainder of her career. In mid-1948, she embarked on a training cruise for NROTC midshipmen that included a visit to British Columbia. The ship took part in cold-weather training exercises held off Kodiak, Alaska, in February 1949, before being decommissioned on 25 June and assigned to the reserve fleet. She remained there for more than a decade, before being sold to ship breakers on 14 November 1960.

During her tour in Japan during the occupation, the crew had discovered a 17th century temple bell slated to be melted down for scrap metal, and decided to save it by taking it as a war prize. Upon her decommissioning, the bell was donated to her namesake where it was discovered by a visiting Japanese academic who recognized its significance and asked for it back. Then return of the bell began a relationship between Duluth and Ōhara, Japan, where the bell was originally from. The Duluth is remembered to this day for saving the bell in both cities, where the original is proudly displayed along with a replica donated to Duluth as a symbol of peace and friendship between the two countries to this day.
