= USS Topeka (CL-67) =

Light cruiser of the United States Navy

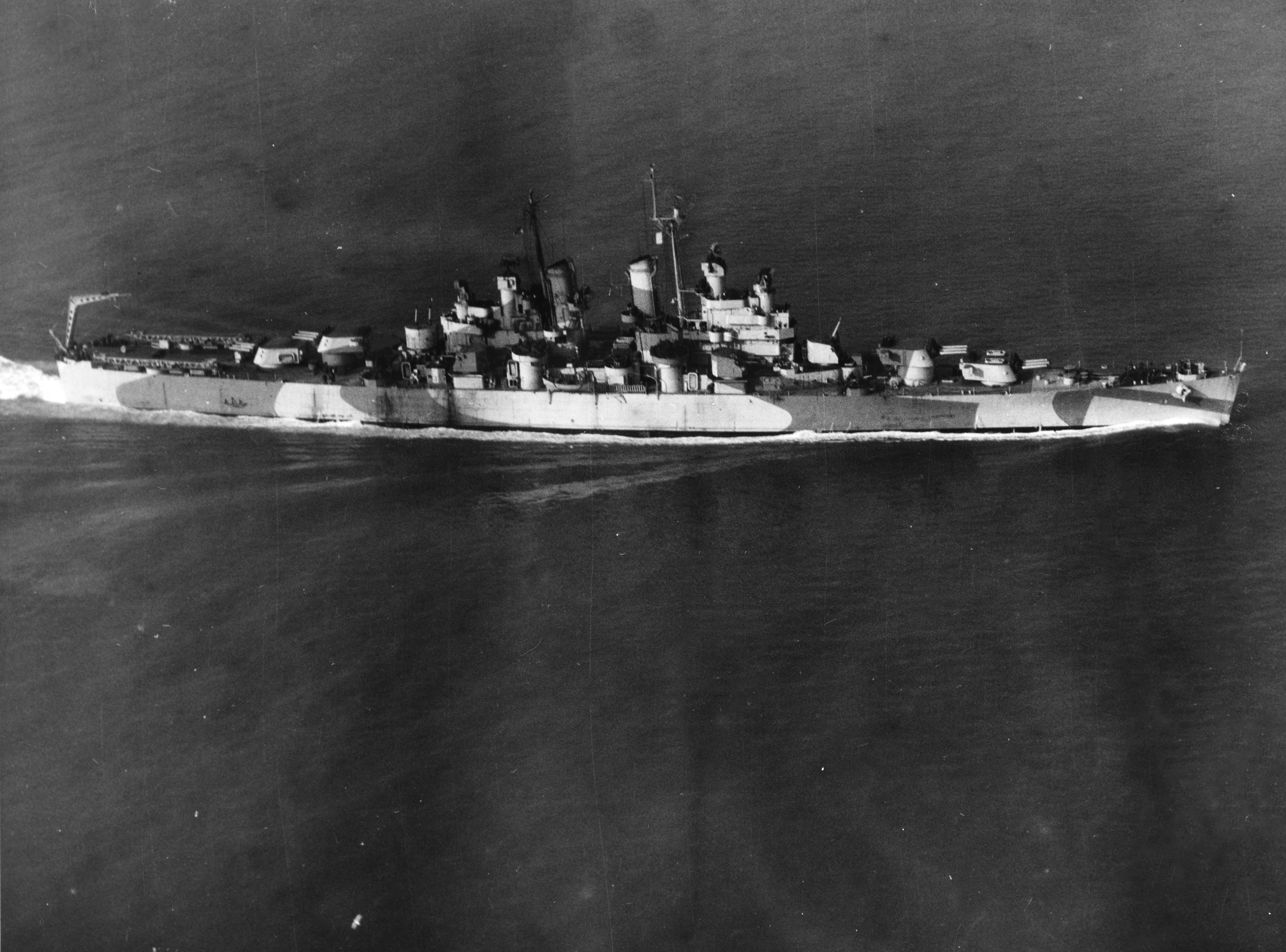
- USS Topeka (CL-67) in January 1945

History

United States
- Name: Topeka
- Namesake: City of Topeka, Kansas
- Builder: Bethlehem Shipbuilding Corporation's Fore River Shipyard, Quincy, Massachusetts
- Laid down: 21 April 1943
- Launched: 19 August 1944
- Sponsored by: Mrs. Frank J. Warren
- Commissioned: 23 December 1944
- Decommissioned: 18 June 1949
- Recommissioned: 26 March 1960
- Decommissioned: 5 June 1969
- Reclassified: CLG-8 on 23 May 1957
- Stricken: 1 December 1973
- Identification: Hull symbol:CL-67; Hull symbol:CLG-8; Code letters:NWLQ
- Motto: "Honor Freedom Valor"
- Honors and awards: 2 × battle stars for World War II; 3 × battle stars for Vietnam
- Fate: Sold for scrap on 20 March 1975
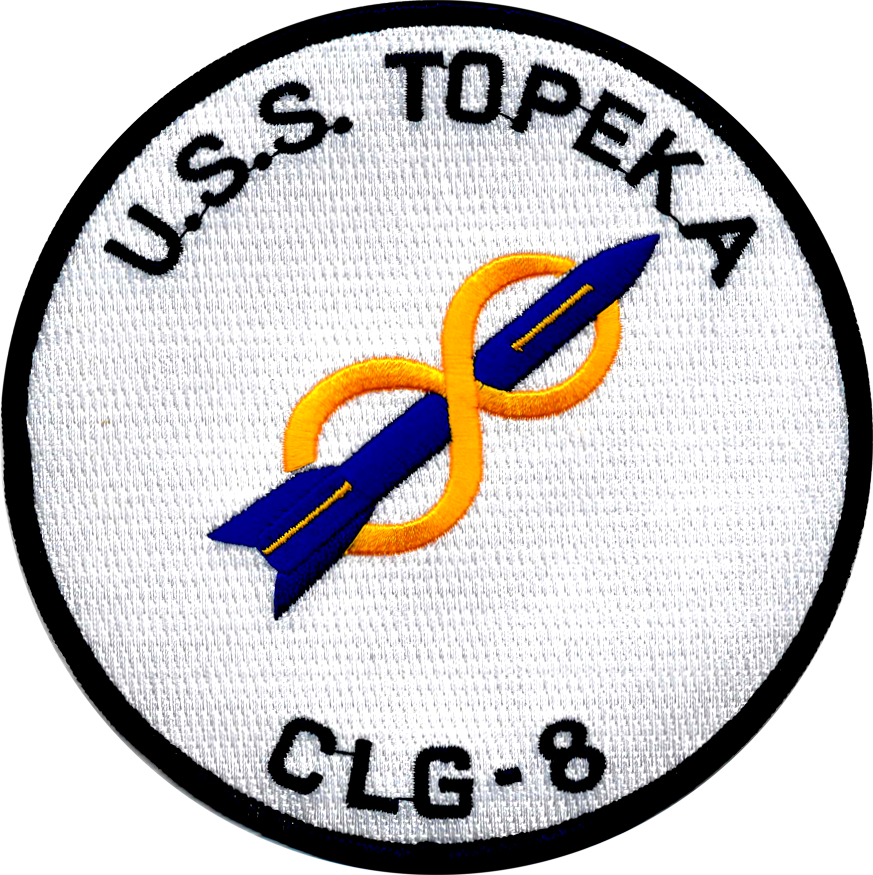
- Badge

General characteristics (as built)
- Class & type: Cleveland-class Light cruiser
- Displacement: 11,744 long tons (11,932 t) (standard); 14,131 long tons (14,358 t) (max)
- Length: 610 ft 1 in (185.95 m) oa; 608 ft (185 m)pp
- Beam: 66 ft 4 in (20.22 m)
- Draft: 25 ft 6 in (7.77 m) (mean); 25 ft (7.6 m) (max)
- Installed power: 4 × 634 psi Steam boilers; 100,000 shp (75,000 kW)
- Propulsion: 4 × geared turbines; 4 × screws
- Speed: 32.5 kn (37.4 mph; 60.2 km/h)
- Range: 11,000 nmi (20,000 km) @ 15 kn (17 mph; 28 km/h)
- Complement: 1,255 officers and enlisted
- Armament: 4 × triple 6 in (150 mm)/47 caliber Mark 16 guns; 6 × dual 5 in (130 mm)/38 caliber anti-aircraft guns; 4 × quad 40 mm (1.6 in) Bofors anti-aircraft guns; 6 × dual 40 mm (1.6 in) Bofors anti-aircraft guns; 21 × single 20 mm (0.79 in) Oerlikon anti-aircraft cannons
- Armor: Belt: 3 1/2–5 in (89–127 mm); Deck: 2 in (51 mm); Barbettes: 6 in (150 mm); Turrets: 1 1/2–6 in (38–152 mm); Conning Tower: 2 1/4–5 in (57–127 mm)
- Aircraft carried: 4 × floatplanes
- Aviation facilities: 2 × stern catapults

General characteristics (1960 rebuild)
- Class & type: Providence-class guided missile cruiser
- Armament: 2 × triple 6 in (150 mm)/47 caliber Mark 16 guns; 3 × dual 5 in (130 mm)/38 caliber anti-aircraft guns; 1 × twin-rail Mark 9 RIM-2 Terrier missile launcher

USS Topeka (hull number: CL-67), a Cleveland-class light cruiser in service with the United States Navy from 1944 to 1949. From 1957 to 1960, she was converted to a Providence-class guided missile cruiser and redesignated CLG-8. The cruiser served again from 1960 to 1969 and was finally scrapped in 1975.

== Construction and commissioning ==
She was laid down on 21 April 1943 by the Bethlehem Steel Company yard located at Quincy, Massachusetts, launched on 19 August 1944, sponsored by Mrs. Frank J. Warren, and commissioned at the Boston Navy Yard on 23 December 1944, Captain Thomas L. Wattles in command.

== Service history ==
=== 1940s ===
After shakedown in the West Indies and post-shakedown repairs, Topeka departed Boston on 10 April 1945 for duty with the Pacific Fleet. The following day she joined Oklahoma City, and steamed via Culebra Island and Guantánamo Bay to the Panama Canal. They transited the canal on 19 April and reported for duty on the 20th. The next day, Topeka and her steaming mate headed for Pearl Harbor, where they arrived on 2 May. Following almost three weeks of gunnery exercises in the Hawaiian Islands, the cruiser sailed west from Pearl Harbor as the flagship of Cruiser Division 18. She entered Ulithi in the Western Carolines on 1 June and, after three days in the anchorage, put to sea with Bon Homme Richard, Oklahoma City, Moale, and Ringgold to rendezvous with Task Force 38.

On her first cruise with the fast carriers, she screened them against enemy air attack while their planes made three raids against targets in the enemy's home islands and the Ryukyu Islands. On 8 June, TF 38 aircraft hit Kanoya on Kyūshū, the home of Japanese naval aviation. The next day, they struck Okino Daito in the Ryukyus, located a little over 200 miles west of Okinawa. The third and final strike of her first combat cruise came on 10 June and provided the cruiser with her initial opportunity to join the fray. While TG 38.1 aircraft bombed and strafed the airfield on Minami Daito, the ships in the screen, Topeka among them, moved in and took the other installations under fire. At the conclusion of that action, Topeka moved off with the rest of TG 38.1 bound for San Pedro Bay, Leyte.

After spending the latter half of June at Leyte for relaxation and replenishment, the light cruiser returned to sea on 1 July with TF 38 for the final six-week carrier sweep of the Japanese home islands. The task force made a fueling rendezvous on the 8th and then began a run-in toward Tokyo which the American planes bombed on 10 July. Next, the ships moved north to Honshū and Hokkaidō for a two-day antishipping sweep of the area around Hakodate and Muroran. They retired from the area for another fueling rendezvous on the 16th, but returned to the vicinity of southern Honshū and resumed the aerial blitz of Tokyo on the 17th–18th. On the night of the latter date, Topeka had another opportunity to strike the enemy directly when she joined Atlanta, Duluth, Oklahoma City, and the destroyers of DesRon 62 in an antishipping sweep of the entrance to Sagami Nada near the sea approaches to Tokyo. During that sweep, she fired her guns at Japanese installations located on Nojima Zaki, the point of land which marks the eastern terminus of the entrance into Sagami Nada. Completing another replenishment retirement from 19 to 23 July, the task force resumed its air raids on central Japan with two extensive forays against shipping in the Inland Sea on the 24th and 28th, respectively.

A typhoon at the end of July forced the task force to take evasive action and postpone further air operations until the second week in August. At that time, Topeka steamed north with TF 38 while the carriers moved into position to send sortie after sortie against heavy concentrations of enemy aircraft on northern Honshū. Those raids, launched on 9–10 August, proved eminently successful, wiping out what was later learned to be the transportation for 2,000 shock troops being assembled for a one-way, suicide mission to destroy the B-29 Superfortress bases on Tinian. The carrier planes paid return visits to Tokyo on the 12th–13th and were taking off to repeat those attacks when a message arrived on the 15th, telling of Japan's capitulation.

Topeka patrolled Japanese waters until mid-September, at which time she entered Tokyo Bay. She remained there until 1 October, the day she began her homeward voyage to the United States. The cruiser stopped briefly at Okinawa on the 4th to embark 529 veterans and resumed her eastern progress on the 5th. On 19 October, she arrived in Portland, Oregon, and disembarked her passengers. Ten days later, she steamed south to San Pedro, Los Angeles, for overhaul. On 3 January 1946, the warship put to sea to return to the Far East. She reached Yokosuka on the 24th and began duty supporting American occupation forces in Japan, China, and in the Central Pacific islands. During that tour of duty, which lasted until the following fall, she called at Sasebo, Japan, Tsingtao and Shanghai in China; Manila in the Philippines; and Guam in the Mariana Islands. The cruiser returned to San Pedro on 20 November.

Following an overhaul and operations along the west coast, she headed back to the Orient on 22 September 1947. Upon her arrival at Yokosuka, Japan, on 10 October, she became a unit of TF 71. Operating from bases at Shanghai and Tsingtao. the warship patrolled the north China coast while civil war raged on shore between Nationalist and communist factions. She concluded that duty early in March and entered Nagasaki, Japan, on the 8th. Following visits to Sasebo and Kure, Topeka sailed for the United States on 25 April and arrived in Long Beach, California, on 7 May. Later that month, she moved to Pearl Harbor for a four-month overhaul at the completion of which she returned to the west coast. Late in October, the warship resumed local operations out of Long Beach and out of San Diego. She remained so occupied until February 1949. On 25 February, she arrived in San Francisco to prepare for inactivation. Topeka was decommissioned there on 18 June 1949, and berthed with the local group of the Pacific Reserve Fleet.

=== 1950s ===
Early in 1957, Topeka was towed from San Francisco to the New York Naval Shipyard, which she entered on 15 April to begin conversion to a Providence-class guided missile light cruiser. On 23 May, she was officially redesignated CLG-8. During the almost three years it took to convert her, the cruiser was extensively modified. She retained only half her original gun battery, losing her two after 6 inch triple turrets and her three aft 5 inch double mounts. The removal of these guns made room for the installation of her twin Terrier surface-to-air missile launcher and related ancillary equipment.

=== 1960s ===
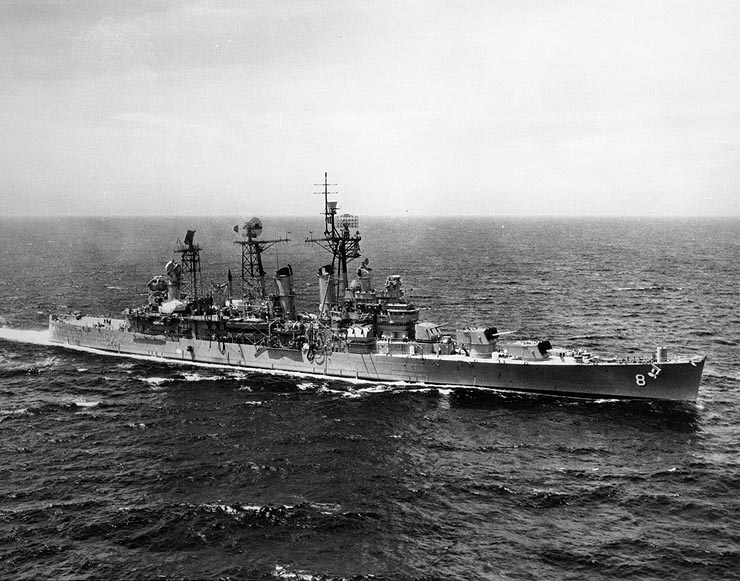
USS Topeka (CLG-8) after conversion to guided missile cruiser

On 26 March 1960, Topeka was recommissioned, Captain Frank L. Pinny, Jr., in command. In July, she made the passage from New York to the west coast. From August to October, the refurbished cruiser conducted shakedown training in the southern California operating area and then reported for duty at her home port, Long Beach. During the ensuing three years, Topeka alternated two peacetime deployments to the western Pacific with repair periods and local operations on the west coast. Her two tours in the Orient were characterized by visits to such places as Hong Kong, the Philippines, Okinawa, and a number of ports in Japan as well as exercises with other ships of the 7th Fleet and of Allied navies. When not deployed to the Far East, she conducted training operations, upkeep, and repairs.

In March 1964, she embarked upon her third deployment to the western Pacific since being recommissioned. That deployment began routinely enough with fleet exercises in May and calls at Japanese, Taiwanese, Malaysian, and Philippine ports. However, in August, North Vietnamese torpedo-boats attacked Maddox on the 2nd and then returned to attack Maddox and Turner Joy. This action, known as the Gulf of Tonkin incident, gave the remaining part of Topeka's deployment a more wartime character. Topeka cruised the waters of the Gulf of Tonkin while American involvement in the Vietnam War began to gather momentum. It was more than a year, though, before she steamed into war in earnest. Late in October, she started for home and reentered Long Beach near the end of the second week of November. For the next 12 months, she viewed the developing war from afar-operating out of west coast ports, undergoing repairs and modifications, and conducting exercises with the 1st Fleet.

On 29 November 1965, however, she headed back to the western Pacific for the first deployment during which her primary mission was to support the American and South Vietnamese forces fighting the communists. On that tour of duty, she served as the flagship for the Commander Cruiser-Destroyer Group, 7th Fleet. In that capacity the ship operated in the South China Sea and in the Gulf of Tonkin providing naval gunfire support for the troops ashore and supporting carrier air operations by conducting search and rescue missions for downed aircrews. She punctuated tours of duty in the combat zone with port visits to Yokosuka, Japan, Hong Kong, and the Philippine ports of Manila, Davao City, and Subic Bay. Her six-month deployment ended on 28 May 1966, when Topeka reentered Long Beach.

Five months of normal west coast operations followed. On 31 October, the guided missile cruiser entered the Hunters Point Naval Shipyard in San Francisco for an overhaul during which her weapons systems were updated, and her engineering plant was overhauled. On 13 March 1967, she completed the yard overhaul and began sea trials and, later refresher training. She finished those evolutions early in June and resumed local operations. On 1 August, the warship put to sea from Long Beach for her first deployment to the Mediterranean Sea. She stopped at Norfolk, Virginia, on 12–13 August to embark the Commander, Cruiser-Destroyer Flotilla 12, and his staff and then sailed for Palma de Majorca on the 14th. On the 20th, Topeka joined the 6th Fleet and, on the 22nd, relieved Galveston as flagship for TG 60.2. During her five months with the 6th Fleet, she ranged the length of the "middle sea." In late September and early October, the warship participated in NATO exercise Eager Beaver, conducted in the eastern end of the Mediterranean. In mid-October, she conducted operations in the Ionian and Tyrrhenian Seas on her way back to the western end.

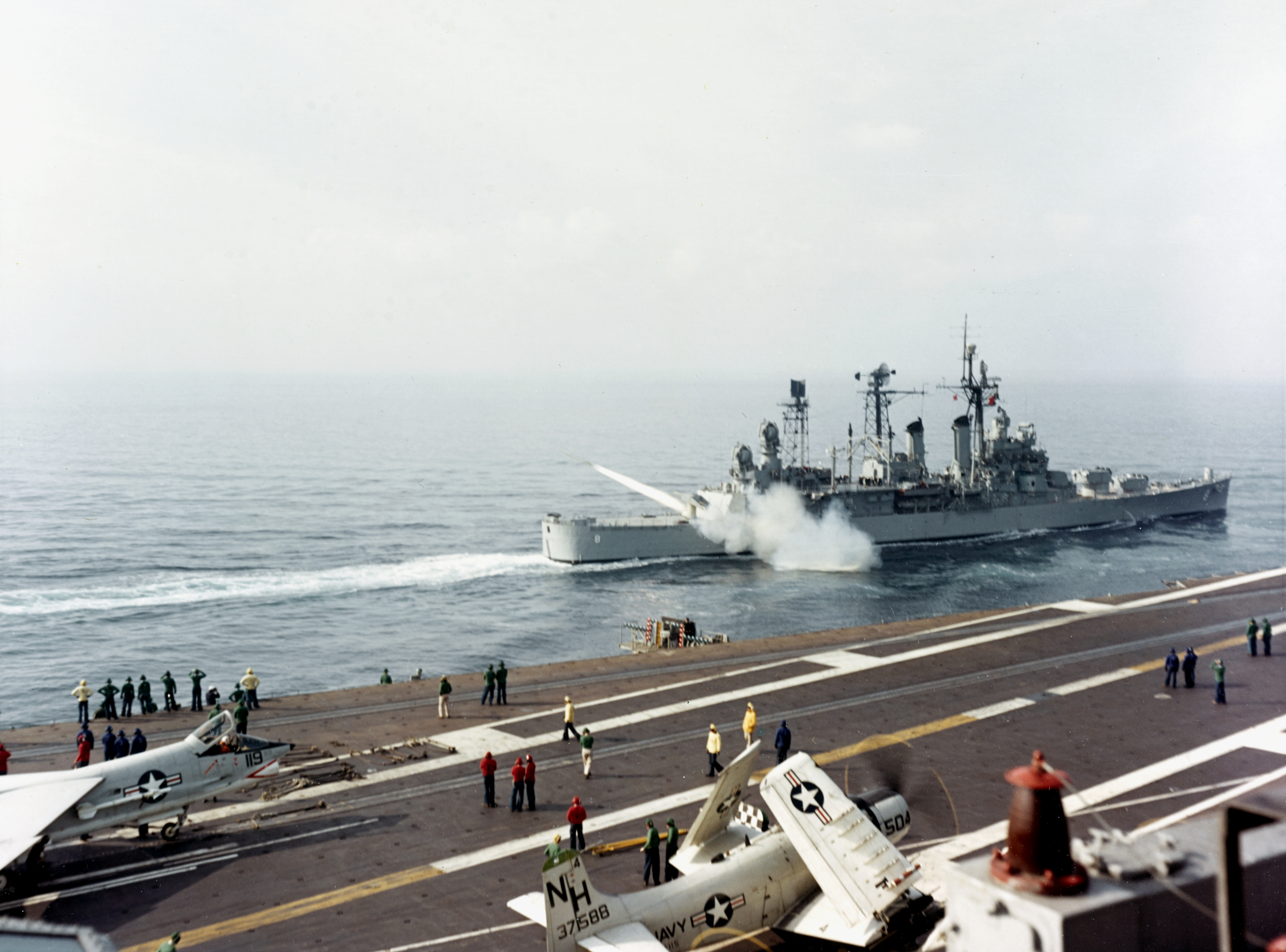
Topeka firing a Terrier-missile in 1961

In January 1968, she concluded her first tour of duty in the Mediterranean with another NATO exercise, this one an amphibious operation. On the 12th, she was relieved by Columbus at Rota, Spain. The cruiser then headed back to the United States. After stops at Puerto Rico and in the Panama Canal Zone, Topeka reentered Long Beach on 29 January.

On 2 February, the warship began a five-week availability at the Long Beach Naval Shipyard. The guided missile cruiser departed Long Beach again on 15 March, bound for her new home port, Mayport, Florida. After arriving at her destination on 21 March, Topeka remained in port for upkeep until 6 May, when she returned to sea for refresher training at Guantánamo Bay, Cuba. Returning to Mayport on the 26th, the ship began preparations for another deployment to the Mediterranean, the last deployment of her career.

Topeka departed Mayport on 29 June and, after gunnery exercises at Culebra Island near Puerto Rico, she headed across the Atlantic. On 9 July, she relieved Columbus at Málaga, Spain, and began 6th Fleet operations. The warship's final deployment proved to be routine in nature. She visited ports all along the Mediterranean littoral and conducted operations in all portions of the middle sea from the Aegean and Ionian Seas in the east to the French Riviera ports in the west. Spain, Italy, Greece, Turkey, and France, as well as the islands of Malta, Crete, and Majorca, provided her with interesting ports of call. Topeka concluded her assignment with the 6th Fleet on 9 December at Rota when she was relieved once again by Columbus. That same day, she headed for Mayport, arriving 10 days later.

On 30 January 1969, Topeka steamed out of Mayport and proceeded north for inactivation. After a stop at Yorktown, Virginia, to off-load her ordnance, she arrived in Boston on 5 February. There, she completed inactivation preparations; and, on 5 June, Topeka was placed out of commission. The warship was towed to Philadelphia and was berthed with the reserve fleet group there.

On 1 December 1973, her name was struck from the Naval Vessel Register, and on 20 March 1975 she was sold to the Southern Scrap Material Company, Ltd., for scrapping.

== Awards ==
Topeka was awarded two battle stars for her World War II service and three battle stars for her Vietnam service.
