= Operation Sailor Hat =

1965 explosives test in Kahoolawe, Hawaii

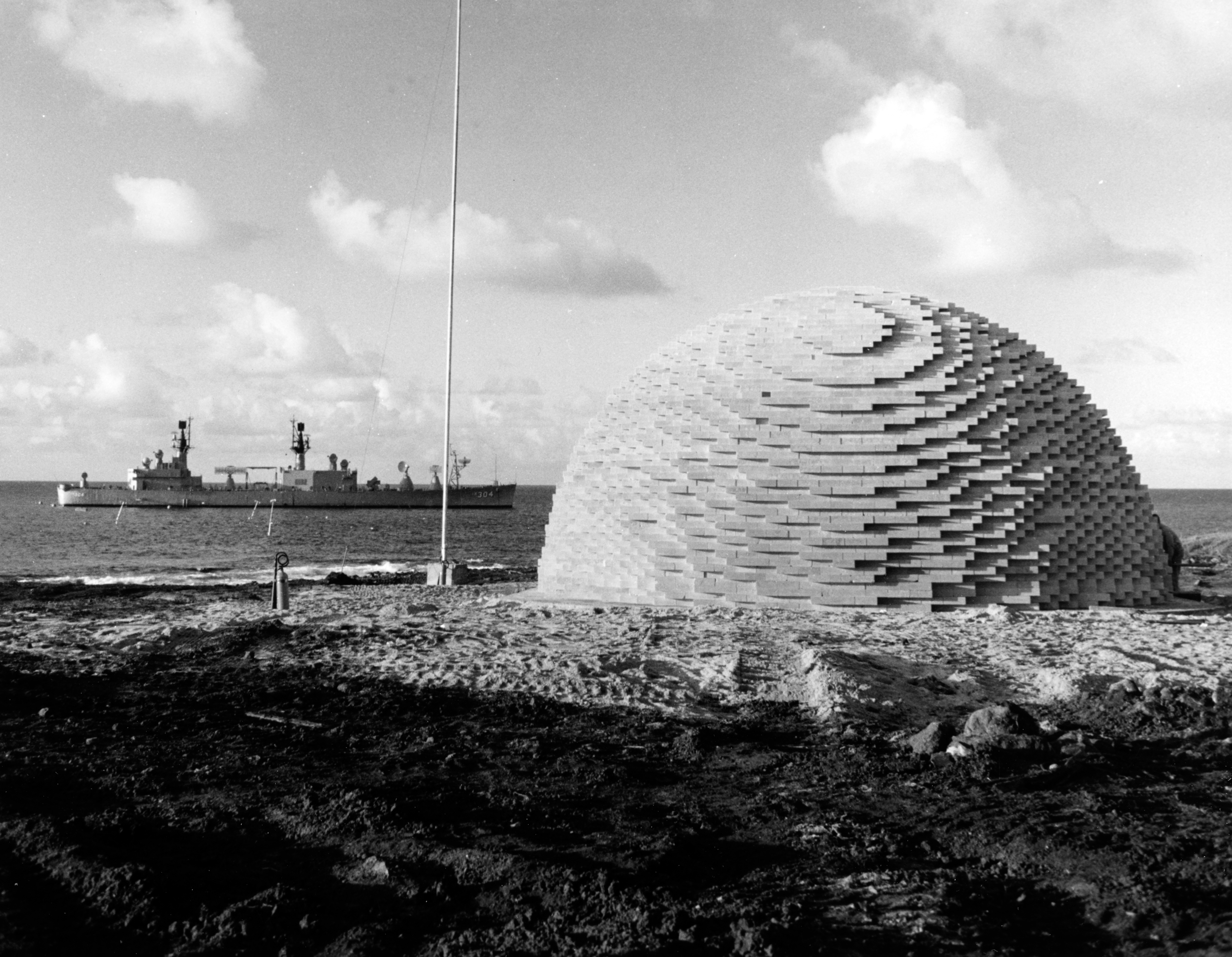
- 500 short tons (454 t) of TNT (5 by 10 meters; 16 by 33 feet) awaiting detonation at Operation Sailor Hat. The USS Atlanta is visible in the background.

Information
- Country: United States
- Test site: Kahoʻolawe, Hawaii; San Clemente Island, California
- Coordinates: 20°30′15″N 156°40′44″W
- Date: November 12, 1964 – June 19, 1965
- Number of tests: 5
- Agency: Bureau of Ships, DASA
- Explosive: TNT, HBX
- Configuration: Stacked Hemisphere; Underwater Charge
- Max. yield: 0.5 kilotons of TNT (2.1 TJ)

Test chronology

Operation Sailor Hat was a series of explosives effects tests, conducted by the United States Navy Bureau of Ships under the sponsorship of the Defense Atomic Support Agency. The tests consisted of two underwater explosions at San Clemente Island, California in 1964 and three surface explosions at Kahoʻolawe, Hawaii in 1965. They were non-nuclear tests employing large quantities of conventional explosives (TNT and HBX) to determine the effects of a nuclear weapon blast on naval vessels, and the first major test of this kind since Operation Crossroads in July 1946.

Each "Sailor Hat" test at Kahoʻolawe consisted of a dome-stacked 500-short-ton (454 t) charge of TNT high explosive detonated on the shore close to the ships under test. Since a TNT detonation releases energy more slowly than a nuclear explosion, the blast effect at close range was designed to be equivalent to a 1 kiloton of TNT (4.2 TJ) nuclear weapon at greater distance. The main ship used for testing was the former Cleveland-class light cruiser USS Atlanta. In addition, the guided-missile frigates USS England and USS Dale, the guided-missile destroyers USS Cochrane, USS Benjamin Stoddert, and USS Towers, and the Royal Canadian Navy's escort destroyer HMCS Fraser all participated in the trial. These were a mixture of the obsolete, Atlanta having been built during WWII, and the recently constructed Cochrane. The highly complex operation yielded data useful for determining and improving blast resistance of naval ships.

== Background ==
When the Limited Test Ban Treaty came into effect in 1963, it prohibited nuclear testing in the atmosphere and underwater. The Defense Atomic Support Agency turned to alternative methods of generating airblast effects with high explosives. The previous year in 1964, Operation Snowball was a 500-ton HE test on the Experimental Proving Ground in Alberta, Canada that provided technical information related to nuclear weapon detonation. In 1963, DASA called on the Bureau of Ships to conduct a full scale explosives test with conventional chemical explosives and a test site had to be chosen.

Following the Japanese attack on Pearl Harbor, the Territory of Hawaii was placed under martial law and the island of Kahoʻolawe was used as a training ground, fleet bombing, and gunnery range. This made it a natural choice for Operation Sailor Hat, since it also had deep waters close to shore and was only 90 miles (140 km) away from the Pearl Harbor Naval Shipyard in Honolulu that could provide industrial support.

== Preparations ==
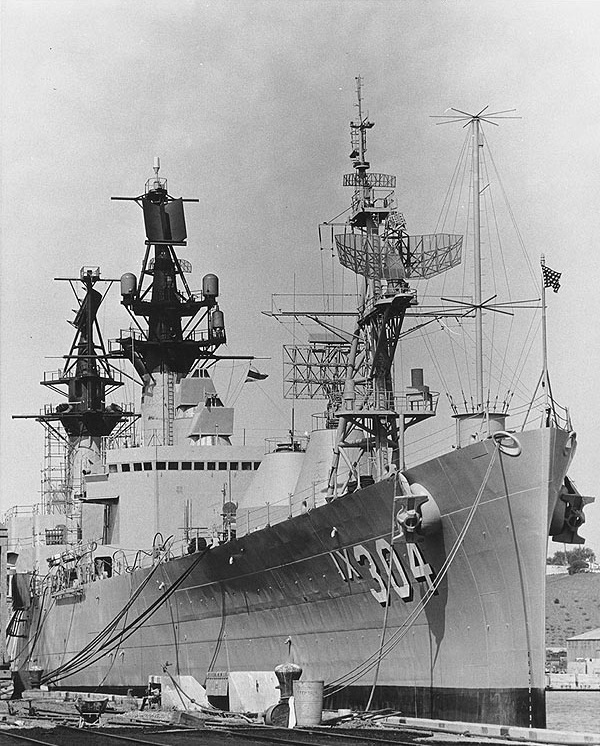
USS Atlanta at the Hunters' Point Naval Shipyard, San Francisco, California, circa October 1964, while completing conversion to a weapons effects test ship

A test platform was needed for the operation that could mount a variety of equipment and structures. The light cruiser USS Atlanta was decommissioned in 1949 and placed in the Pacific Reserve Fleet, then in 1962 earmarked for disposal. However, after undergoing extensive modifications at San Francisco Naval Shipyard she was converted to a target ship (reinstated as IX-304) to study the effects of high energy air explosions. The hull was cut down to the main deck level and two different types of destroyer deckhouses and three mast arrays were fitted. Representative destroyer systems for communication, detection, fire control and weapons delivery were installed and an experimental reinforced fiberglass deckhouse was constructed for comparison with aluminum ones used at the time. It was noted that in such an unusual configuration the refitted Atlanta received many stares and comments while en route to the test site in Hawaii.

The preparation of the charges was in itself an engineering feat. The TNT was supplied by the Naval Powder Factory in Hawthorne, NV that developed a method of producing high quality cast blocks from materials recovered from old torpedoes, mines and other weapons. A total of 92,022 4 by 12 by 12 inches (101.6 mm × 304.8 mm × 304.8 mm) blocks were produced for the tests. The Navy Construction Battalion Three had the hazardous task of carefully assembling 30,674 32.98-pound (14.96 kg) TNT blocks into 34-foot (10 m) hemispheres that reached a height of 17 feet (5.2 m) for each of the three tests. The domes were placed on thin octagonal concrete pads close to shore. In order to obtain the desired results, the ships also needed to be moored at precise distances from the charge for each test. This proved a difficult task in high winds and was accomplished with help from the Bureau of Ships, the tug USS Sunnadin (ATA-197) and salvage ships USS Safeguard (ARS-25) and USS Current (ARS-22)

== Tests ==
The first shots were performed during test Alpha using 20 short tons (18 t) of HBX explosives detonated 200 feet (61 m) under water. The purpose was to determine the effects of underwater shock on equipment in preparation for the larger surface shots. The crew reported the blast sounding like a large hammer hitting the ship that caused the deck to move out from under their feet and paint to flake off of piping and bulkheads. For the large surface shots, USS Atlanta was the primary close-in target ship, while the others were stationed more distantly so that they could be repaired more readily. For each successive test, the Atlanta would be placed closer to ground zero thus receiving more damage.

Operation Sailor Hat
Name	Date	Time	Location	Type	Yield	Ships Present
Alpha	12 November 1964	15:15 PST	Off San Clemente Island	Underwater	20 t	USS Atlanta
Alpha	14 November 1964	16:17 PST	Off San Clemente Island	Underwater	20 t	USS Atlanta
Bravo	6 February 1965	14:31 HST	Smuggler Cove, Kahoʻolawe	Surface	500 t	USS Atlanta, USS Cochrane, HMCS Fraser
Charlie	16 April 1965	15:21 HST	Smuggler Cove, Kahoʻolawe	Surface	500 t	USS Atlanta, USS England, USS Benjamin Stoddert, HMCS Fraser
Delta	19 June 1965	11:26 HST	Smuggler Cove, Kahoʻolawe	Surface	500 t	USS Atlanta, USS Dale, USS Towers

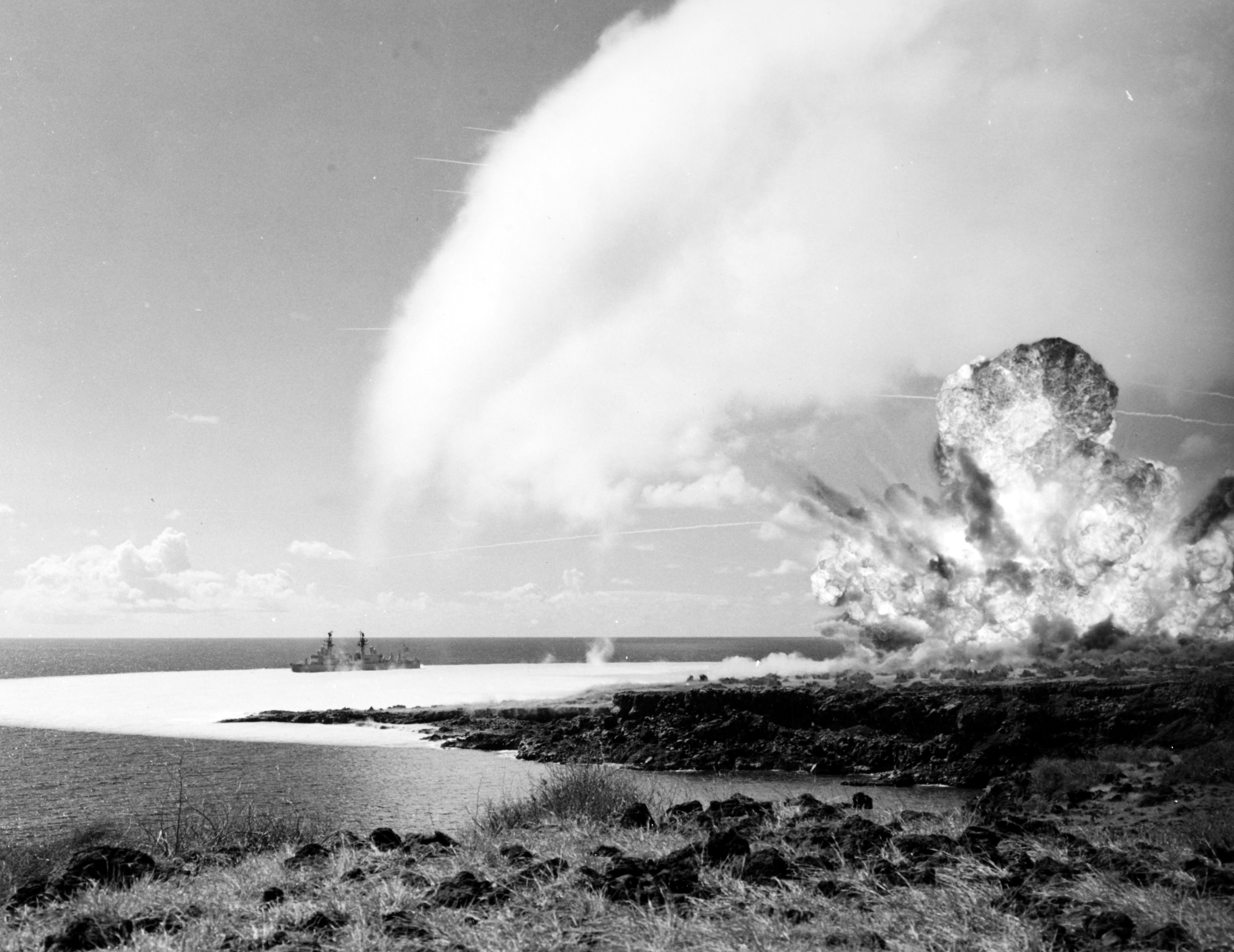
Detonation for Shot "Bravo", first of a series of three test explosions. USS Atlanta is moored in the left center. Note the shock wave spreading over the water just beyond the ship, and the shock condensation cloud lifting overhead

A central timing and firing system was on board Atlanta to direct photo planes, smoke rockets and hundreds of recording instruments, the synchronization of which was essential. The test shots resembled a small nuclear explosion, creating a shock wave on the water and an expanding shock condensation cloud. The fireball and mushroom cloud were present but since no nuclear bomb was involved, no radiation or dangerous fallout was produced. The blast created an overpressure of 10 pounds per square inch (69 kPa) on the target, a moving wall of highly compressed air with maximum wind speeds of 294 miles per hour (473 km/h). An overpressure blast of that magnitude is equivalent to a 1 megatonne of TNT (4.2 PJ) burst at roughly 8,000 feet (2,400 m) and is sufficient to be lethal and capable of destroying reinforced concrete buildings. Knowing the yield of the blast, this also implies the Atlanta was placed around 800 feet (240 m) away from ground zero for that particular test. Two blimps were also destroyed high above ground, and a life size mannequin placed on the deck facing the blast was violently thrown over. The first test Bravo also produced a large amount of rock ejecta that caused secondary damage. To solve this problem, the second shot was placed over a five-foot (1.5 m) mound of sand, and the last shot Delta was detonated over the previous crater that was back filled with 39,000 cubic yards (30,000 m^{3}) of sand.

=== Effects ===
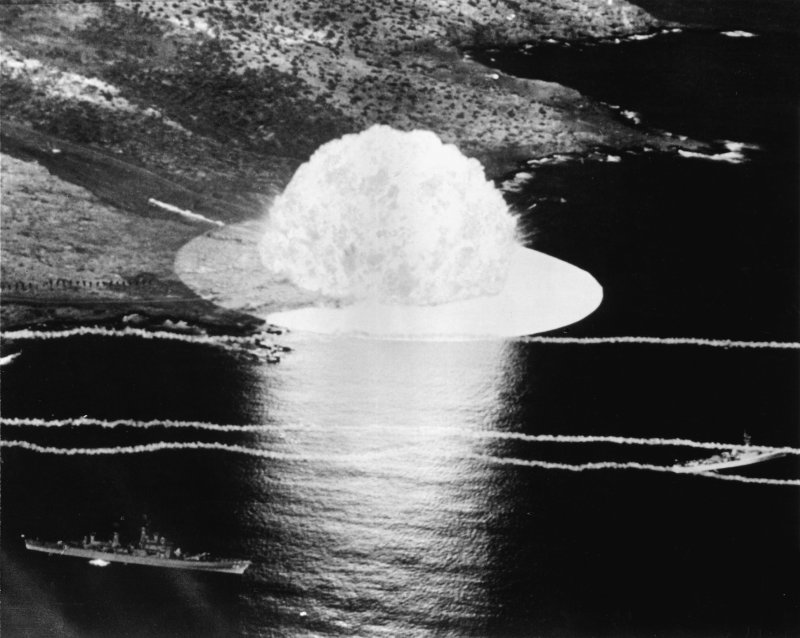
USS England and USS Atlanta during the second shot Charlie of Operation Sailor Hat

On USS Atlanta, over 500 high-speed cameras recorded the effects of the blast. During the tests, the ship was manned by a 169-man navy crew and 60 scientific personnel who remained below deck. In spite of the topside damage, the crew below deck experienced only a shock equivalent to that experienced aboard an Iowa-class battleship firing a nine gun 16-inch salvo. Had there been personnel in the superstructures, they would have been violently thrown about. Topside, the SPS-37 and SPS-10 antennas as well as the URD-4 radio direction finder were torn off by the blast, while other structures were severely deformed. The AN/SPG-51 Tartar guided missile radar was put out of operation for one hour. While the anti-submarine ASROC launcher and Mark 32 torpedo tubes were damaged, the rockets and Mark 44 and Mark 46 torpedoes inside were intact. The Mark 25 torpedo tube was severely damaged, aluminum casting cracked, hold down bolts elongated, the insulating blanket destroyed and the muzzle door sprung, but surprisingly, the tube remained operational. The tripod mast carrying electronics gear was destroyed and fell to the deck. On the blast side, components of the hardened deck house sustained a permanent 2-inch (51 mm) deflection. The entire DLG 16 deck-house between two levels was blown in after welds were ruptured.

USS England was placed farthest from the blast center and thus experienced the least damage, the most serious of which was only a dent where a boulder had hit the ship. The shock wave reportedly caused the ship to move side to side by as much as 4 feet (1.2 m).

On USS Cochrane, power was lost for 5 minutes after the ship was hit by the blast overpressure. She was able to restore power and return to Pearl Harbor Naval Shipyard for a hull and systems inspection and to assess the effects of the blast. The yard was impressed with how well the blast was resisted. After some minor repairs (Both the 3-Dimensional AN/SPS-39 & 2-Dimensional AN/SPS-40 Air Search Radar Antennas had to be replaced) Cochrane was cleared for her first deployment.

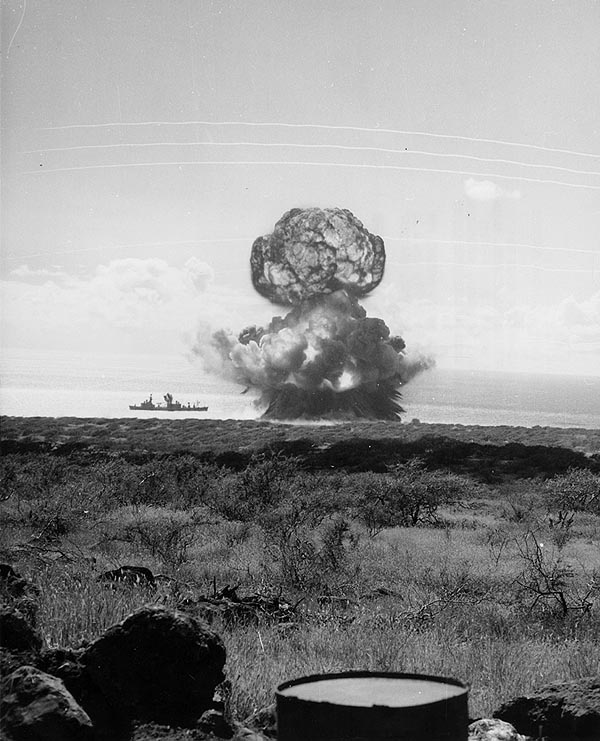
Shot Bravo, the first test, with the test ship Atlanta (IX-304) moored nearby. Note smoke or dust around the ship's foremast, and the shock wave perimeter expanding on the water beyond the ship

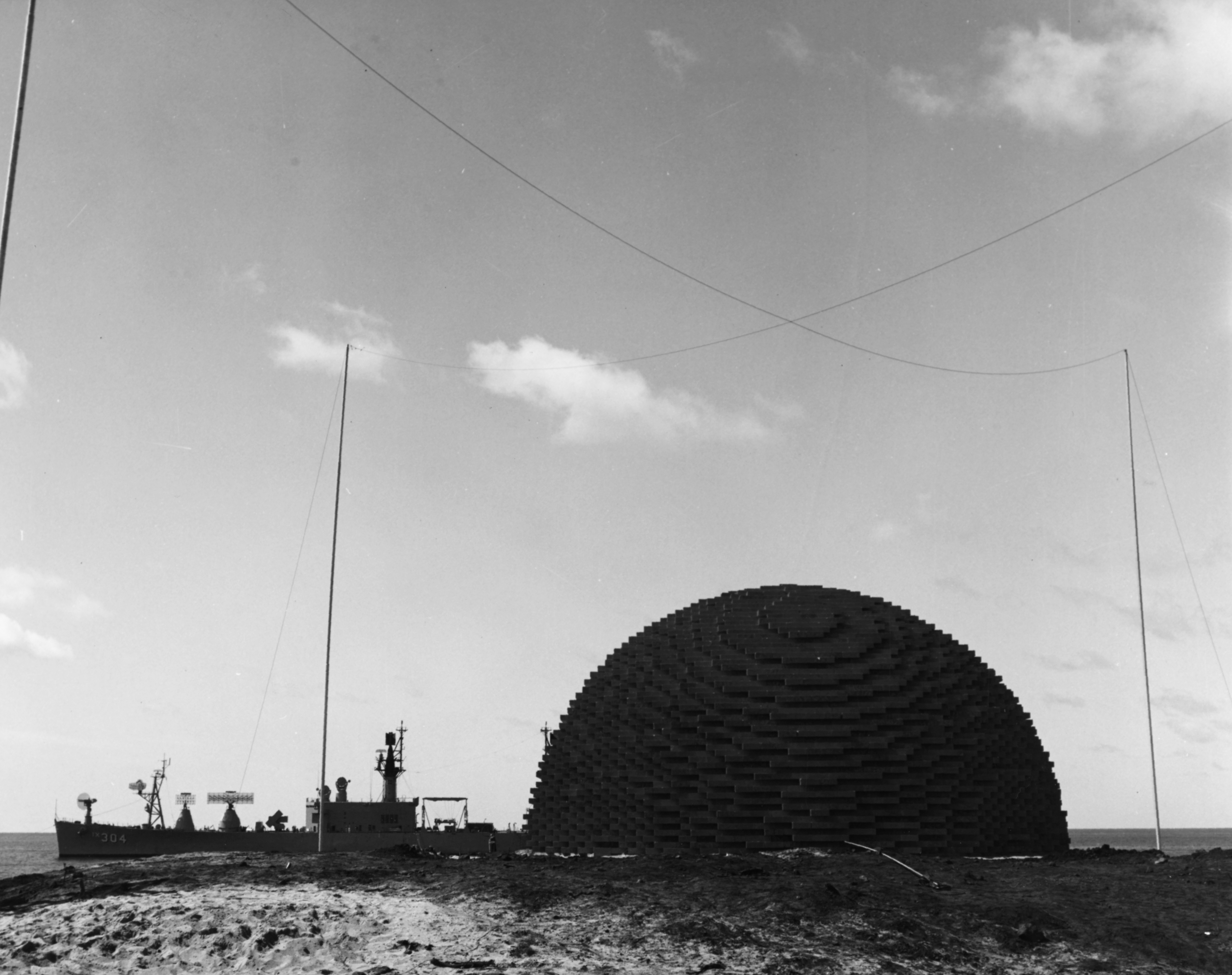
Shot Charlie, ready for detonation. USS Atlanta is moored in the background, with her bow facing left

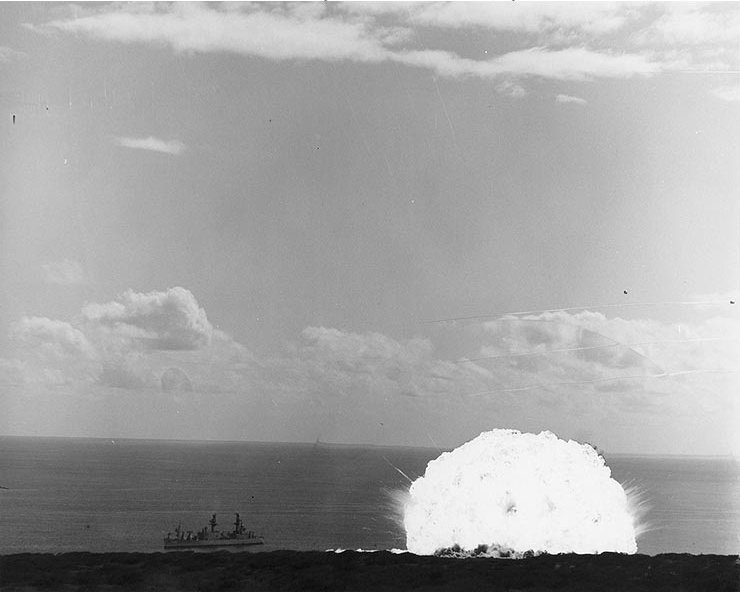
Shot Charlie, the second of three test explosions. USS Atlanta is moored to the left of the blast, with her bow pointing to the left

== Results ==
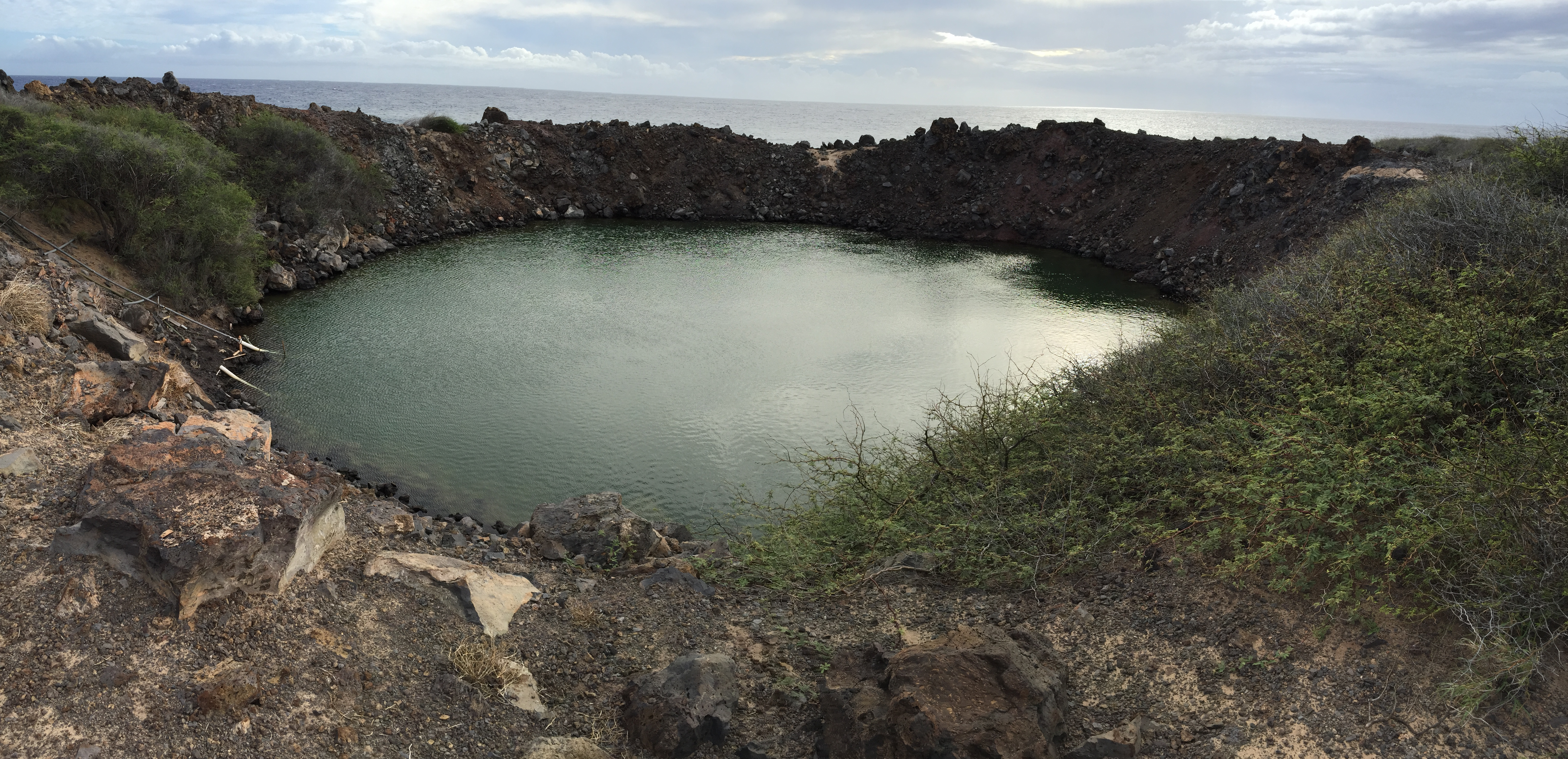
The crater created by Operation Sailor Hat

The operation demonstrated that some components were vulnerable to air blast, while others proved quite resilient. However, only low-cost improvements and minor design changes were needed without imposing unacceptable weight and cost factors or compromising operations. For example, although some antennas were incapacitated, antenna designs needed modifying only at the ruggedization level rather than at the concept level. The test data were intended also to be used in better damage-range standoff predictions and to provide design and specification information for better survivability in combat.

In addition to the projects directly associated with the ship evaluation program, various other projects were supported. These dealt with seismic effects, underwater acoustics, radio communications, cratering phenomena, free-field air blast measurements, fireball generation, cloud growth and electromagnetic effects.

The remaining crater left by the blast is called the "Sailor's Hat" crater and holds an anchialine pool containing Halocaridina rubra shrimp, which are salt-tolerant.

== See also ==
- High explosive nuclear effects testing, list of non-nuclear explosives tests
- Minor Scale, largest non-nuclear test
