= Oakland Seaport =

Container ship facility in Oakland, California

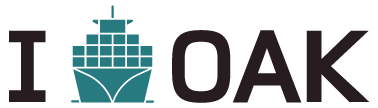

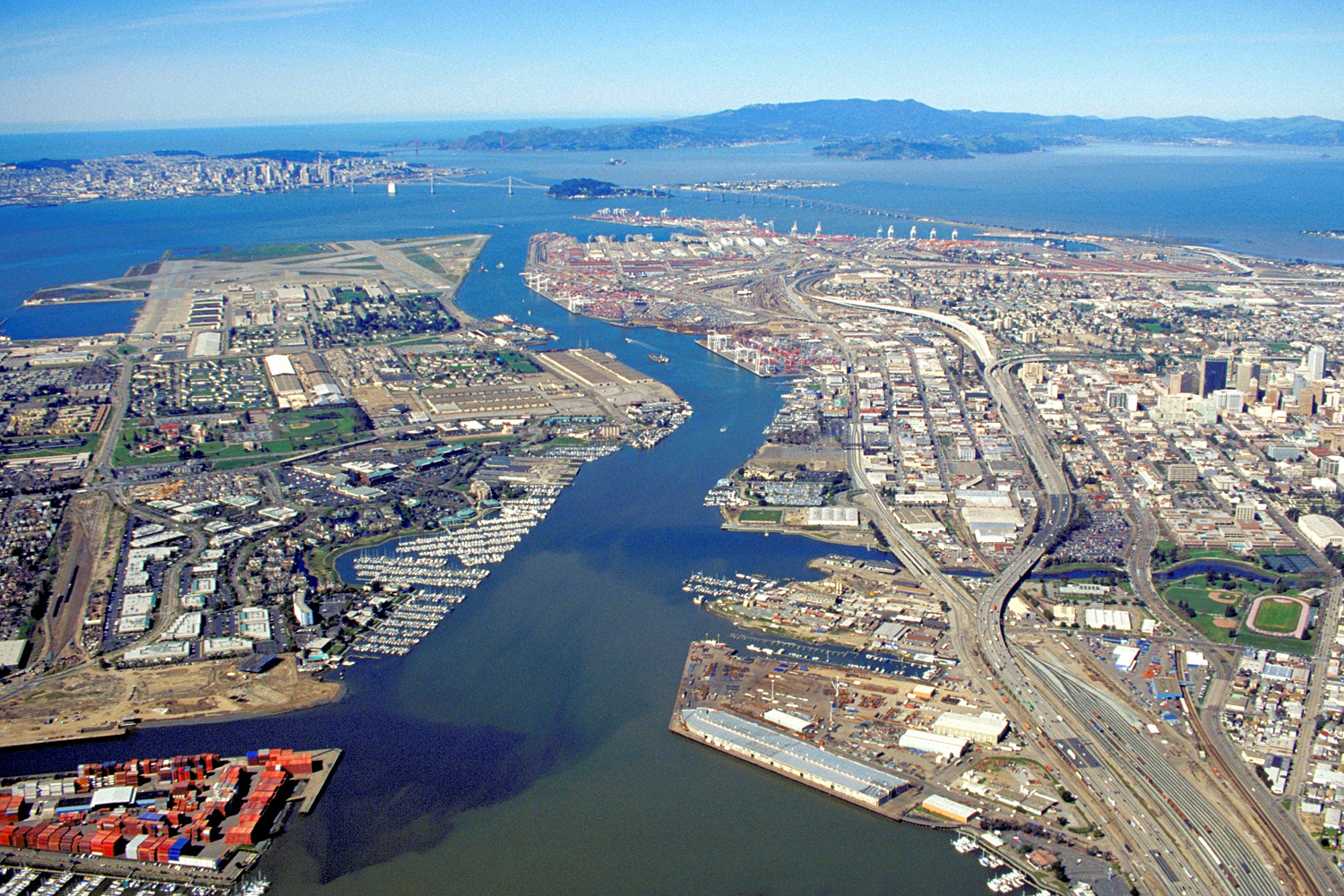
- Aerial view of the Oakland Seaport
- Interactive map of Oakland Seaport

Location
- Country: United States
- Location: Oakland, California
- Coordinates: 37°47′43.92″N 122°17′4.57″W

Details
- Opened: 1927
- Operated by: Port of Oakland
- Owned by: City of Oakland
- No. of berths: 20
- Draft depth: 50 feet (15 m)
- Air draft: 220 feet (67 m), restricted by Golden Gate Bridge

Statistics
- Vessel arrivals: 1,775 (FY 2014)
- Annual container volume: 2,394,069 twenty-foot equivalent units (TEU) (FY 2014)
- Website www.oaklandseaport.com

The Oakland Seaport is a major container ship facility located in Oakland, California, in the San Francisco Bay. It is operated by the Port of Oakland port authority along with the Oakland San Francisco Bay Airport. It was the first major port on the Pacific Coast of the United States to build terminals for container ships. As of 2022, it was the eighth busiest container port in the United States, behind the ports of Los Angeles, New York/New Jersey, Long Beach, Savannah, Houston, Virginia, and Seattle/Tacoma. Development of an intermodal container handling system in 2002 after over a decade of planning and construction positions the Oakland Seaport for further expansion of the West Coast freight market share. In 2019 it ranked 8th in the United States in the category of containers.

== Early history ==
In 1852, the year of Oakland's incorporation as a town by the California State Legislature, large shipping wharves were constructed along the Oakland Estuary, which was dredged to create a viable shipping channel. 22 years later, in 1874, the previously dredged shipping channel was deepened to make Oakland a deep-water port.

In the late 19th century, Southern Pacific was granted exclusive rights to the port. In January 1906, a small work party employed by the Western Pacific Railroad built a crossing over the Southern Pacific line to connect the Western Pacific mainline with trackage built on an area of the landfill. This act was protested by Southern Pacific and later upheld in court. The court ruled that all landfills since the date of the agreement did not belong to Southern Pacific, ending their monopoly.

The port was not officially named the Port of Oakland until 1927, under the leadership of the newly organized Board of Port Commissioners.

In 1962, the Port of Oakland began to admit container ships. Container traffic greatly increased the amount of cargo loaded and unloaded at the port. By the late 1960s, the Port of Oakland was the second-largest port in the world in terms of container tonnage. However, depth and navigation restrictions in San Francisco Bay limited its capacity, and by the late 1970s, it had been supplanted by the Ports of Los Angeles and Long Beach as the major container port on the West Coast.

During an expansion of the port in the late 1960s, fill material was added to what remained of the old Southern Pacific mole. The fill came largely from the concurrent excavation of the Berkeley Hills Tunnel during the construction of the BART system. The BART trunk line also crosses over part of the port, and the east portal of the Transbay Tube that carries BART trains from Oakland to San Francisco lies within the port.

== Recent history ==
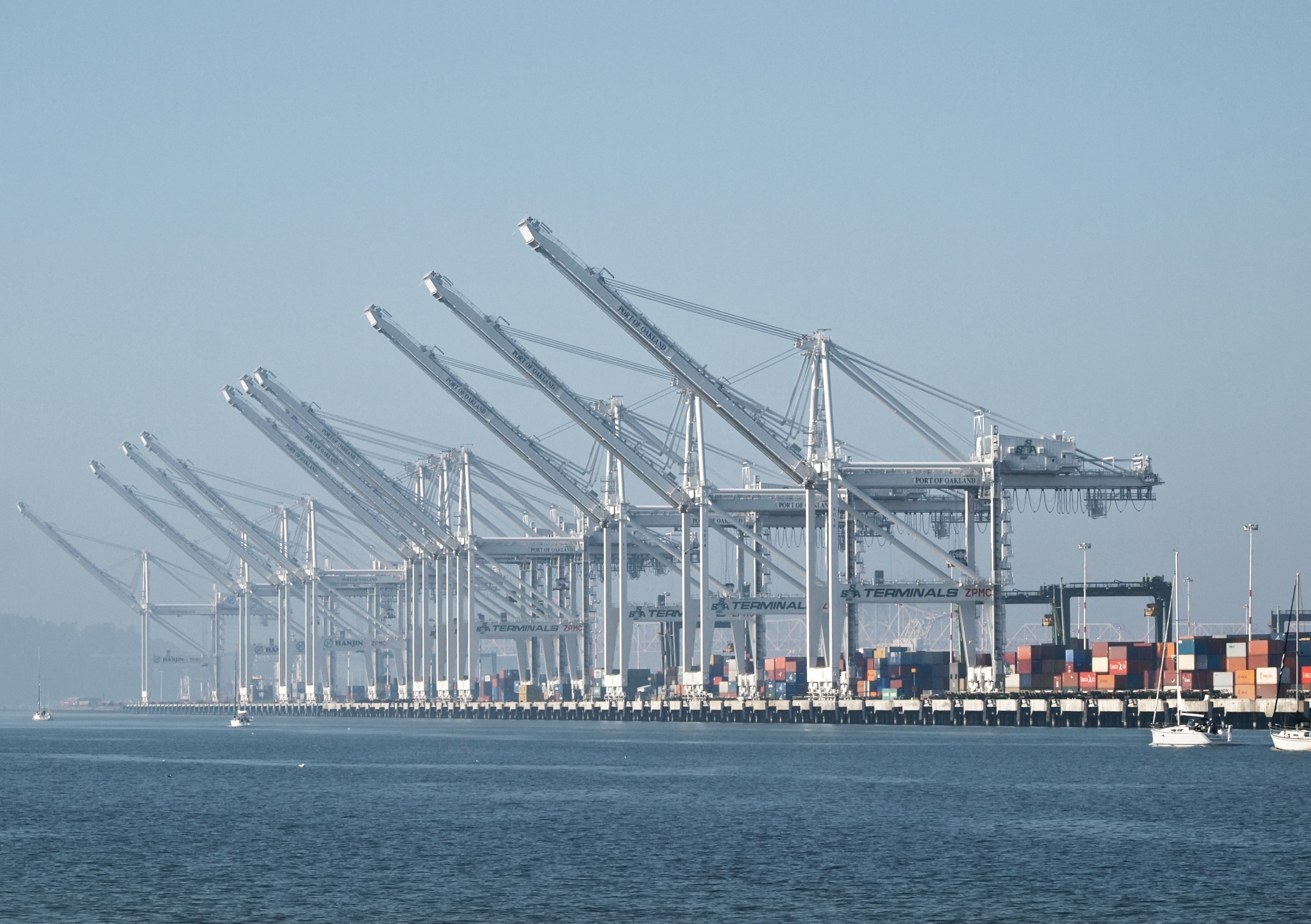
Cranes in the Oakland Seaport

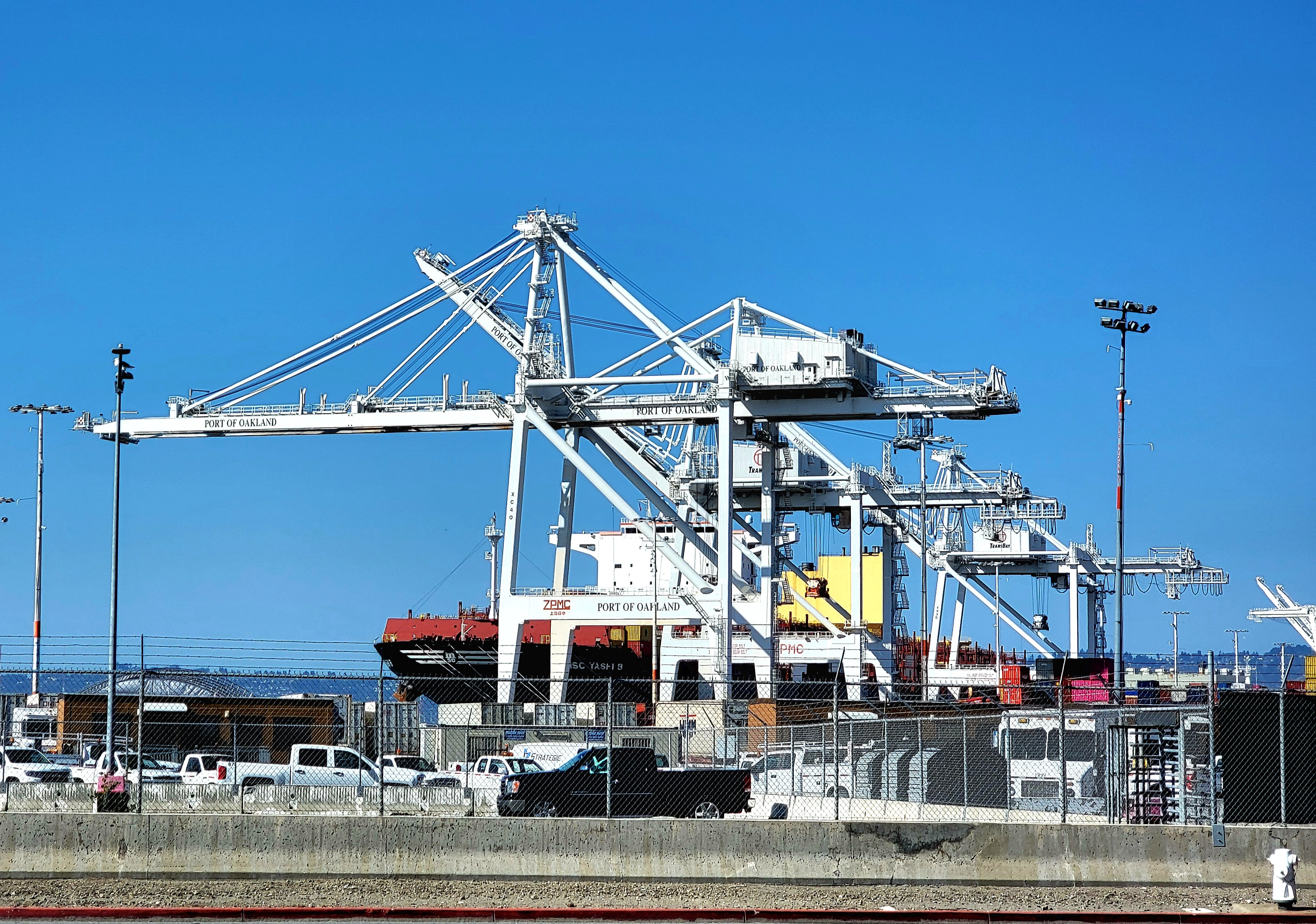
Container crane at the Oakland Seaport

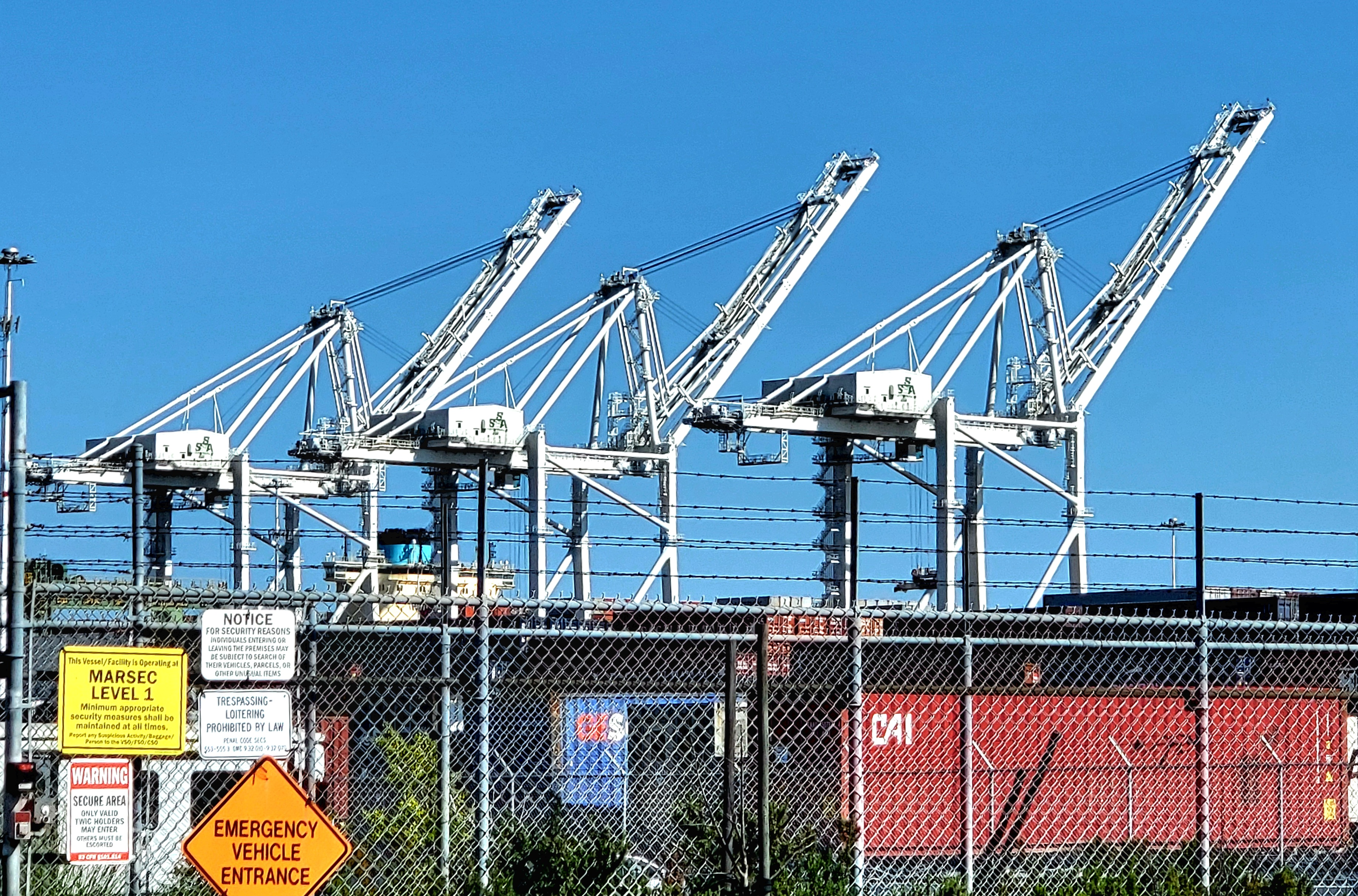
Container cranes at the Oakland Seaport

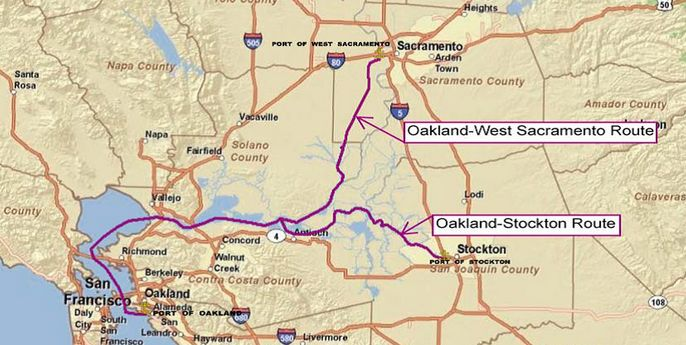
California's Green Trade Corridor Marine Highway project

One of the main limitations to growth was the inability to transfer containers to rail lines at West Oakland Yards; all cranes historically operated between ocean vessels and trucks. In the 1980s, the Port of Oakland began the evaluation of the development of an intermodal container transfer capability, i.e., facilities that would allow the trans-loading of containers from vessels to either trucks or rail modes. The port retained VZM, Korve Engineering, and Earth Metrics to perform engineering and environmental studies to allow detailed engineering to proceed. In 1987, on behalf of the Oakland Port Commission, Allen Broussard led a group of 72 lawyers, port officials, including then-port commissioner Carole Ward Allen, and city officials on a 3-week trip to China, meeting the Mayor of Shanghai, Jiang Zemin (Shanghai is twinned with San Francisco).

The completion of the resulting rail intermodal facility occurred in 2002. That brought the cumulative investment in port expansion to over $1.4 billion since 1962, half of which comprised the intermodal facility. In the early first decade of the 21st century, the new intermodal rail facility, along with severe congestion at the Ports of Los Angeles and Long Beach, caused some trans-Pacific shippers to move some of their traffic to the Port of Oakland (especially if the final destination is not in Southern California but lies farther east). Also, the port is now reaping the benefits of investment in post-panamax cranes, dredging, and the transfer of military property, which has now been used for expansion.

The deepening of the port from 42 feet (13 m) to 50 feet (15 m) to accommodate larger ships has been completed. The ports of Los Angeles, Long Beach, Seattle, and Tacoma were already 50 feet (15 m) deep. The $432 million project was finished in September 2009. Some 6 million cubic yards (4,600,000 m^{3}) of mud from the dredging was deposited at the western edge of Middle Harbor Shoreline Park to become a 188-acre (76 ha) shallow-water wetlands habitat for marine and shore life. Further dredging followed in 2011, to maintain the navigation channel. Prior to the March 2012 arrival of the MSC Fabiola, the largest container ship ever to enter the San Francisco Bay, the Port of Oakland prepared by checking channel depth and dredging as needed. The ship arrived with less than its full draft of 50 feet 10 inches (15.5 m) because it held only three-quarters of a load.

Occupy Oakland, part of the Occupy movement, marched to the port on November 2, 2011, and blocked traffic from entering and leaving. In August 2014, the port was the scene of a protest against an Israeli-owned ship by Palestinian supporters opposed to Israeli military actions in the Gaza Strip. The ship's cargo was eventually unloaded after a 4-day standoff. The Jewish Press commented that unless the port found a solution to their "protester problem," there was a good chance the ship's owner and other cargo firms would find safer ports to do business with.

The Port is part of California’s Green Trade Corridor Marine Highway project, as ships move cargo much greener than trucks and trains. Green Trade Corridor Marine Highway (ports of Oakland-Stockton-West Sacramento) can improve goods movement through Northern California.

In June 2016, The Oakland City Council voted unanimously to ban the handling and storage of both coal and coke at the port. The Oakland City Council voted to ban the handling and storage of coal and coke at the city's terminals and bulk material facilities. This decision came in opposition to developer Phil Tagami, CEO of the California Capital and Investment Group, financiers of the forthcoming Oakland Bulk and Oversized Terminal.

The Oakland Athletics of Major League Baseball planned on constructing a new ballpark for the team at Howard Terminal. On April 26, 2018, the Port of Oakland commissioners voted 6-0 unanimously to enter in to a one-year agreement to negotiate exclusively with the Oakland A's. This agreement allowed the A's to pay the Port $100,000 to study economic feasibility and environmental, transportation and accessibility issues.

On November 28, 2018, The Athletics announced that the team had chosen to build its 34,000-seat new ballpark at the Howard Terminal site at the Port of Oakland. However, after delays in stadium planning, in 2023, the Oakland Athletics instead chose to move to Las Vegas, effectively ending the plans for the Howard Terminal Ballpark.

== Gallery ==
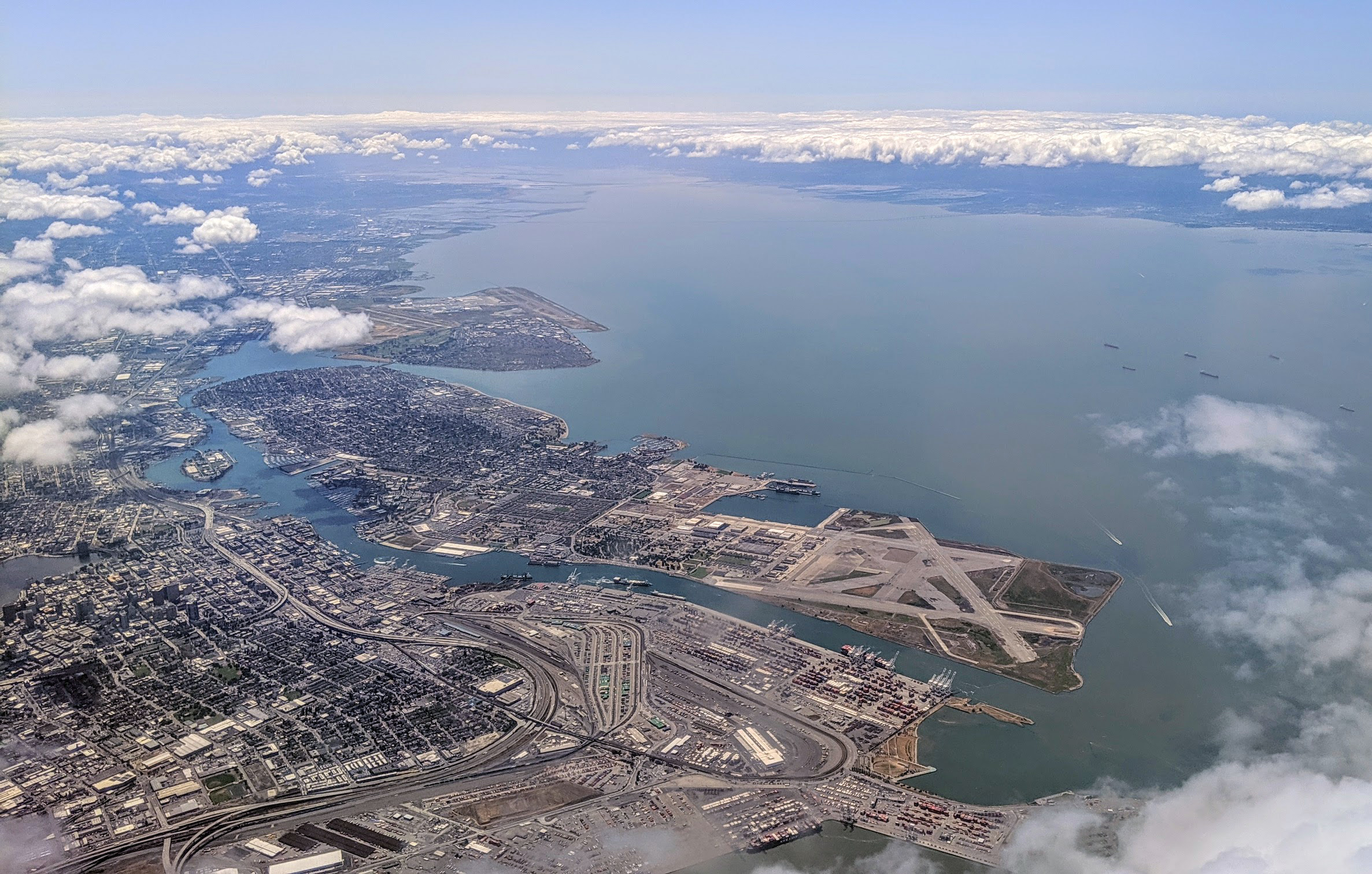
Aerial view, with Alameda Island and the bay

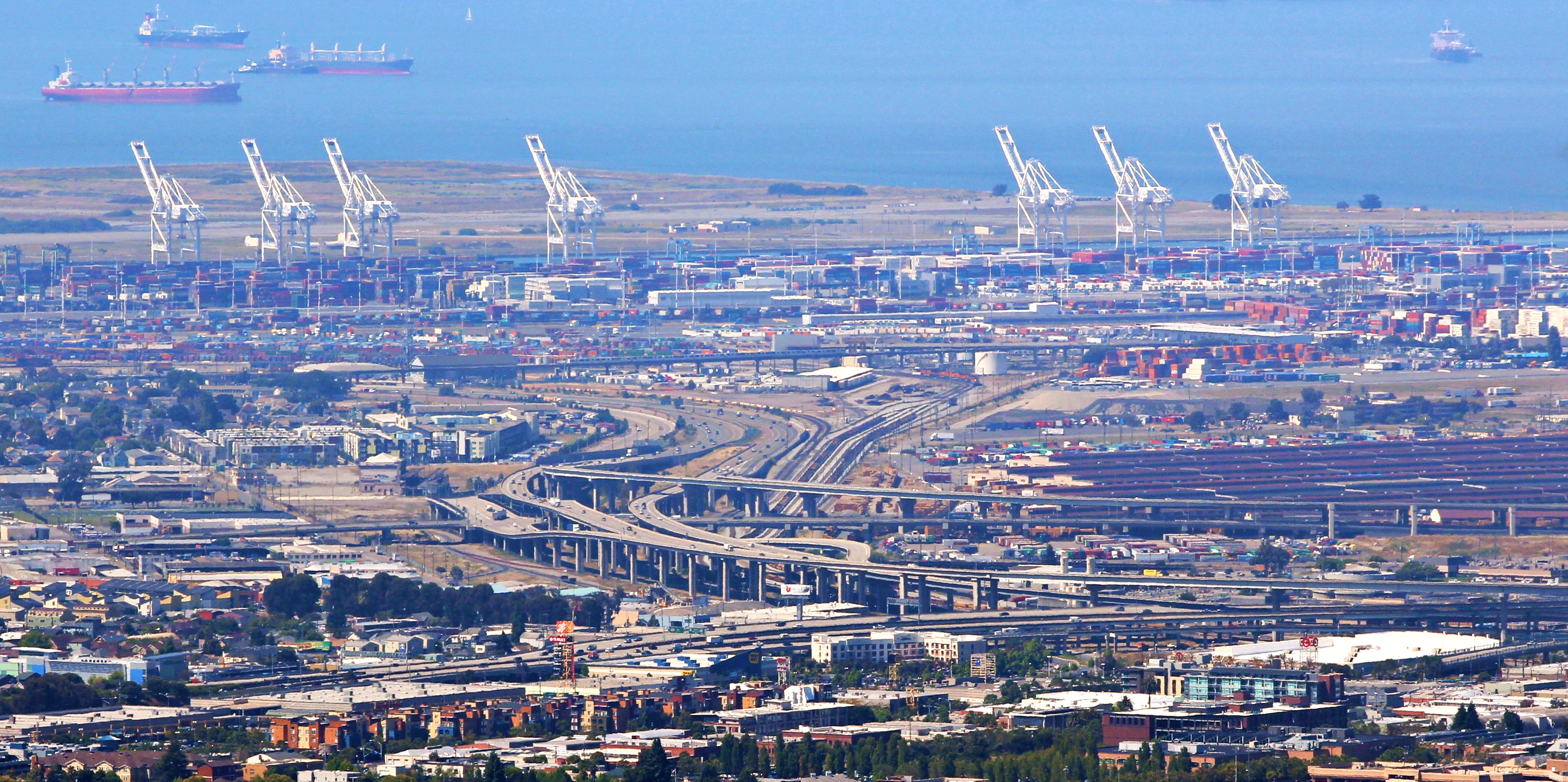
A view of the port

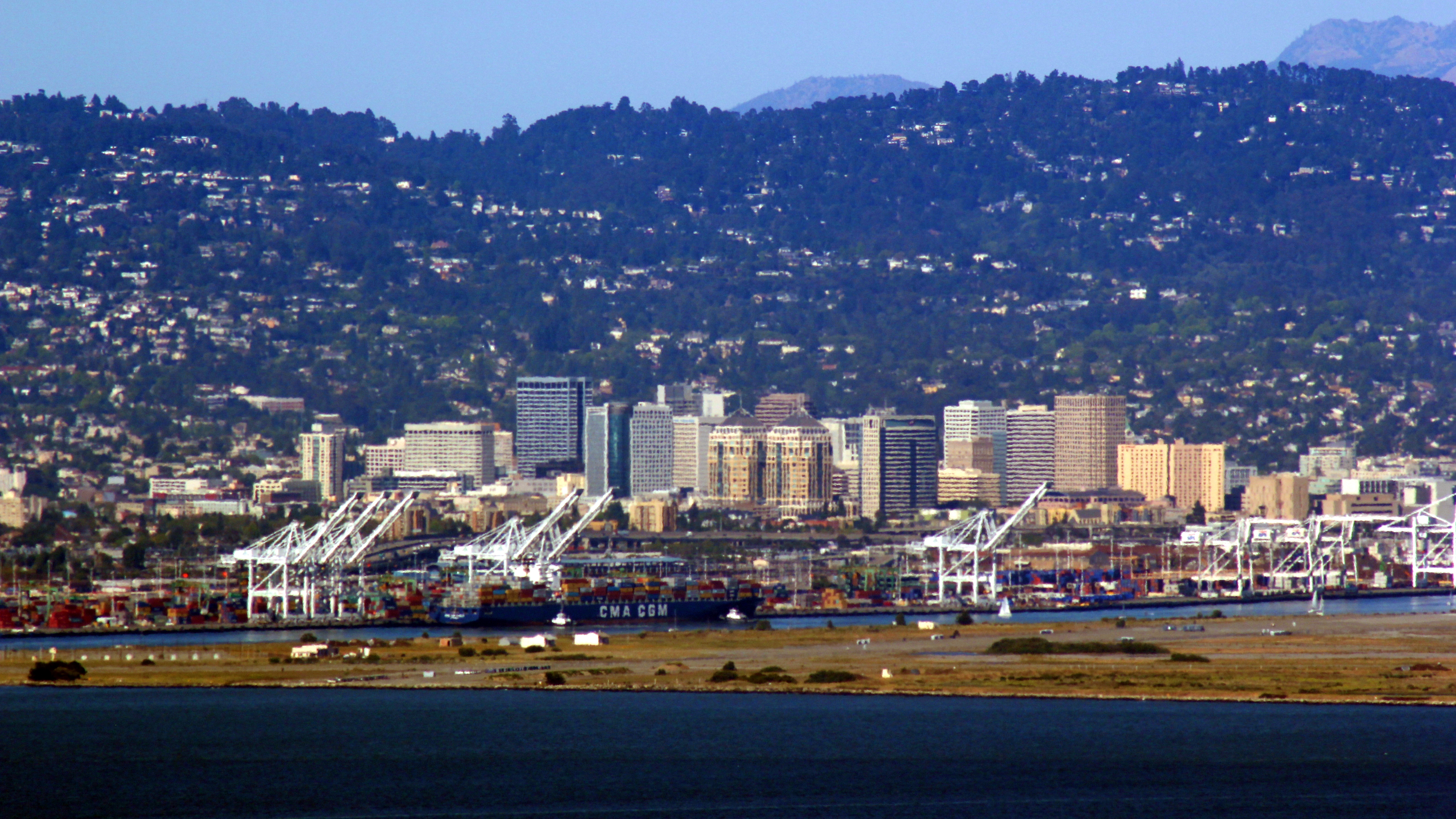
The port with Oakland in the background

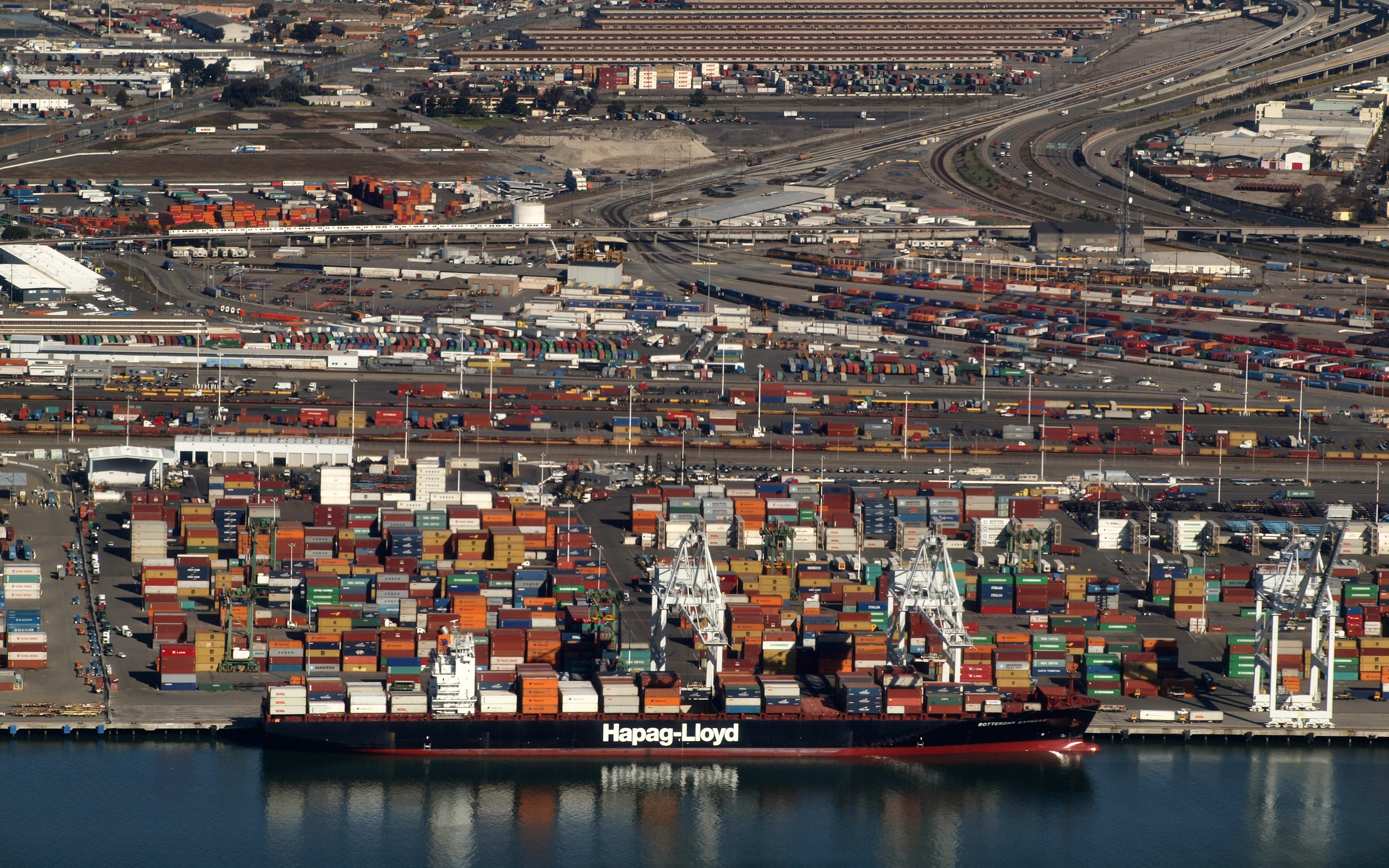
A ship in the port

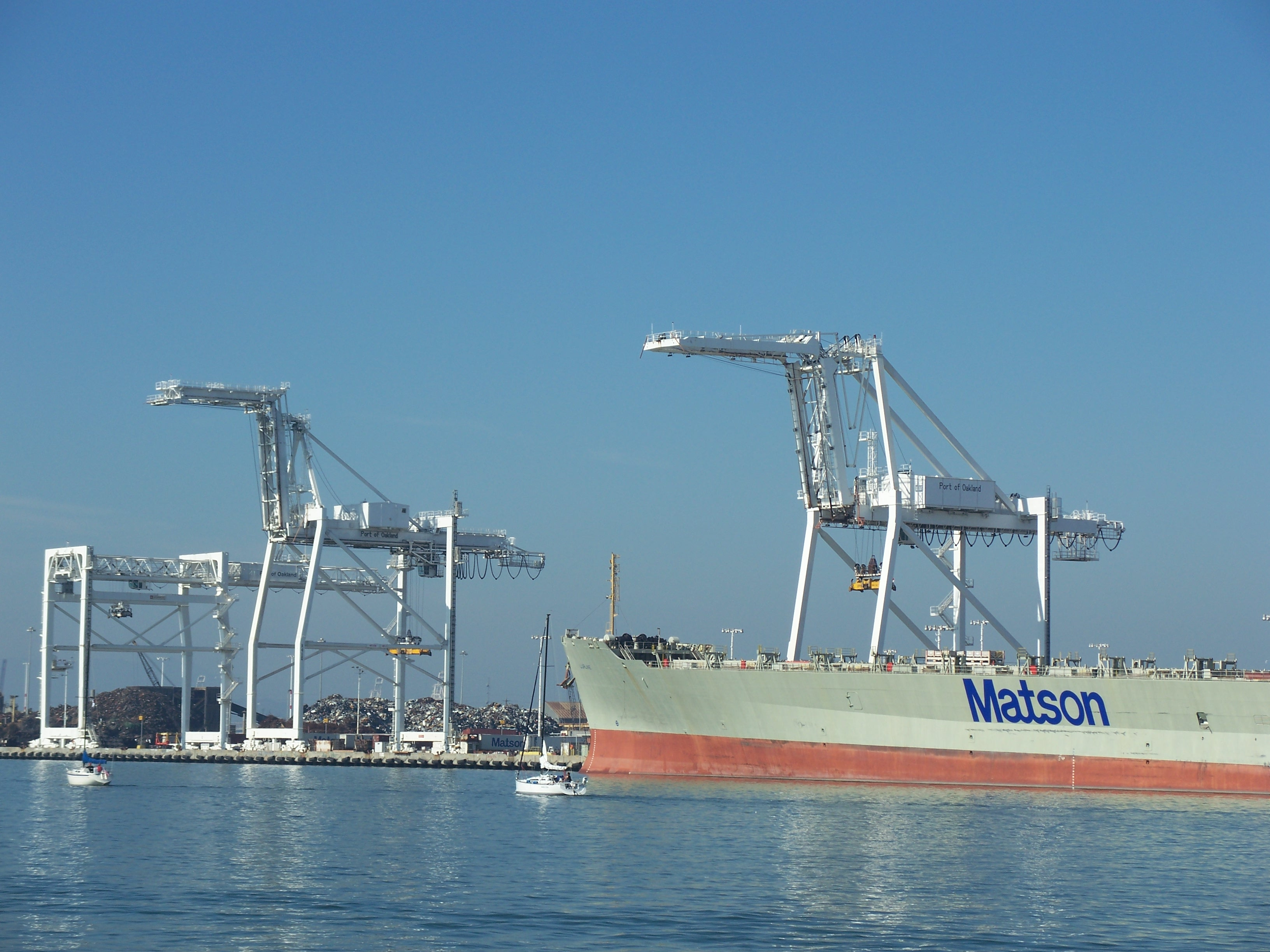
Cranes in the port

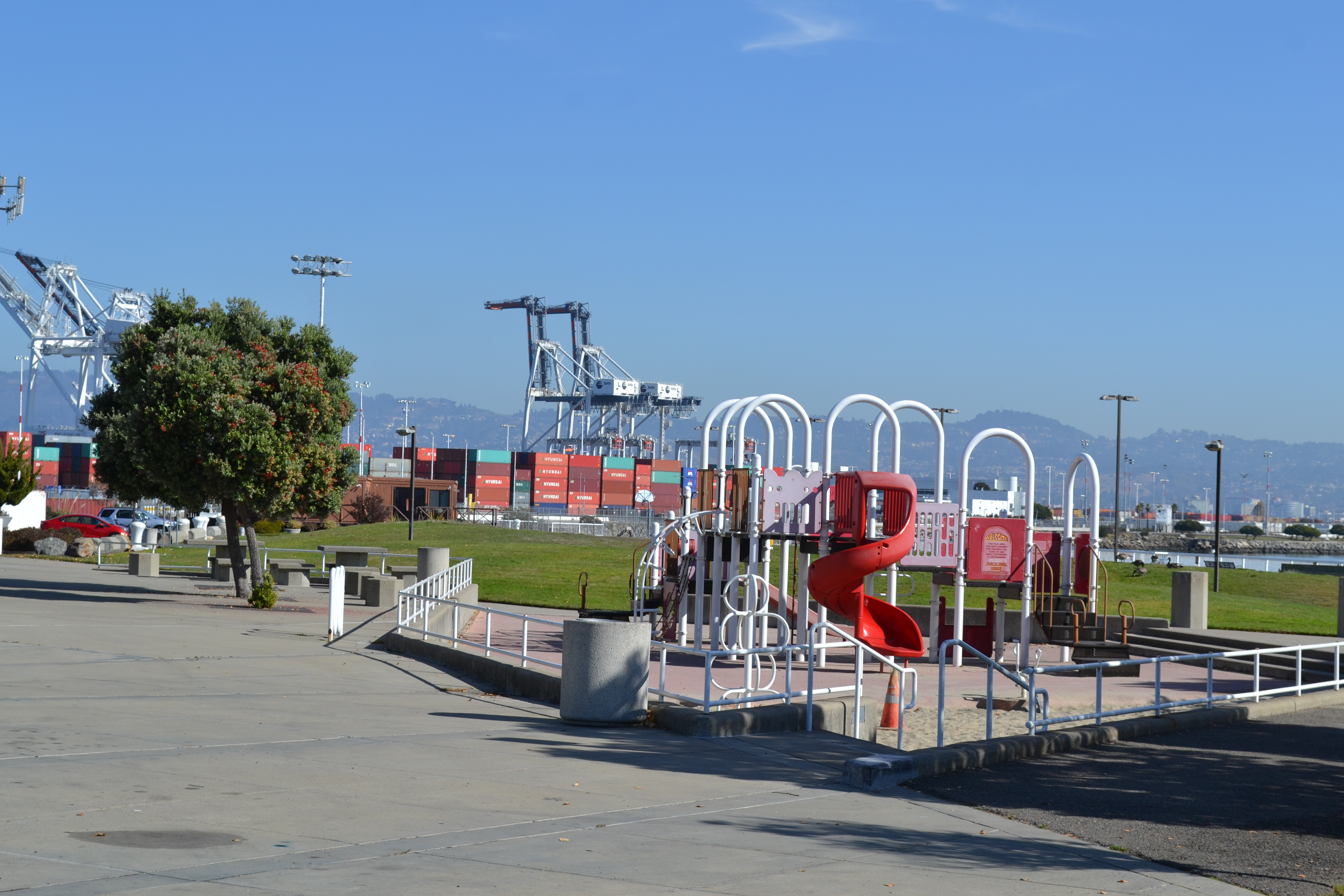
Port View Park in the center of the port

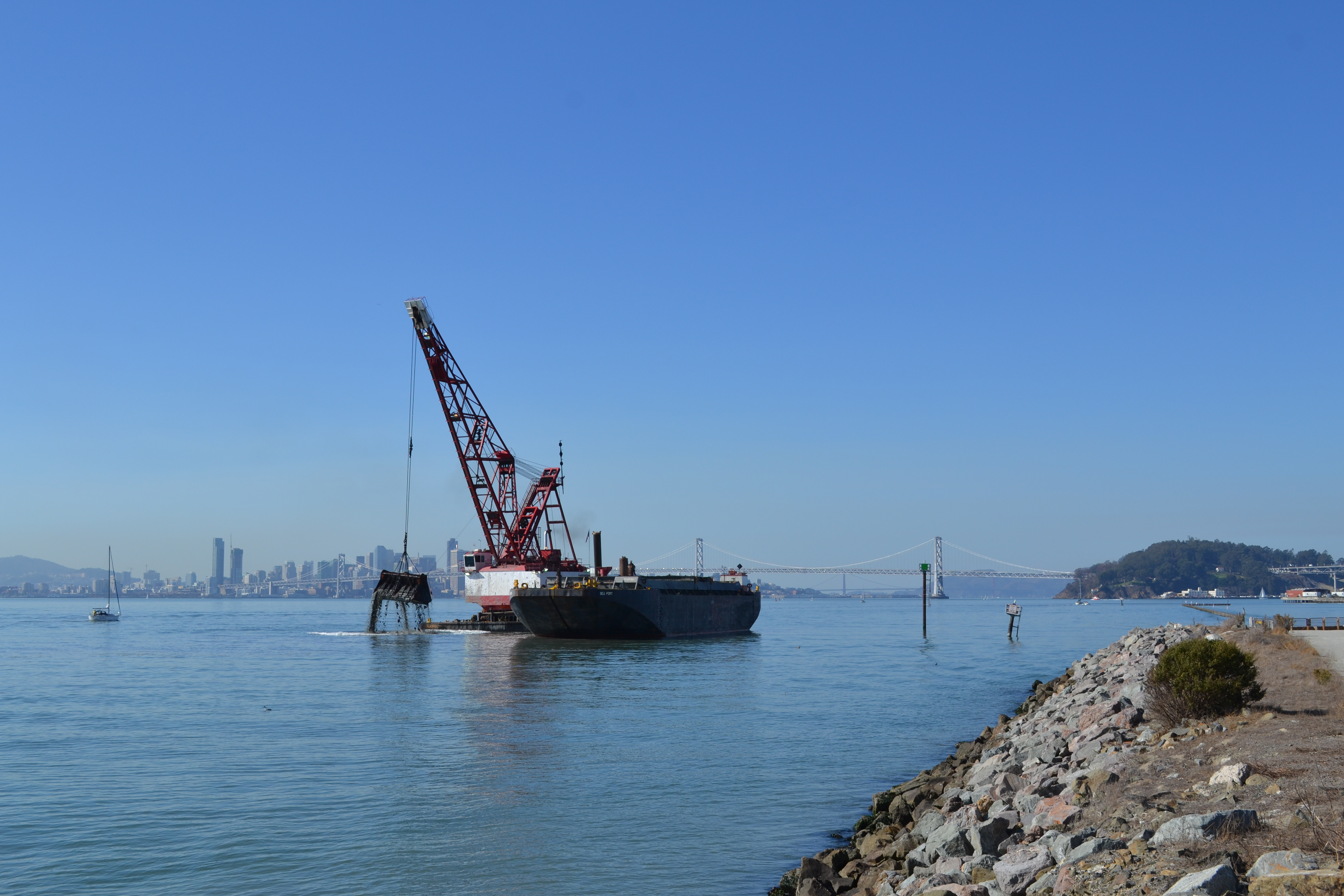
A dredge in the port with San Francisco in the background

== See also ==
- List of ports in the United States
- Port of Redwood City
- United States container ports
- West Oakland Yards
