= Fleet and Industrial Supply Center, Oakland =

Fleet and Industrial Supply Center
- Oakland, California in United States of America
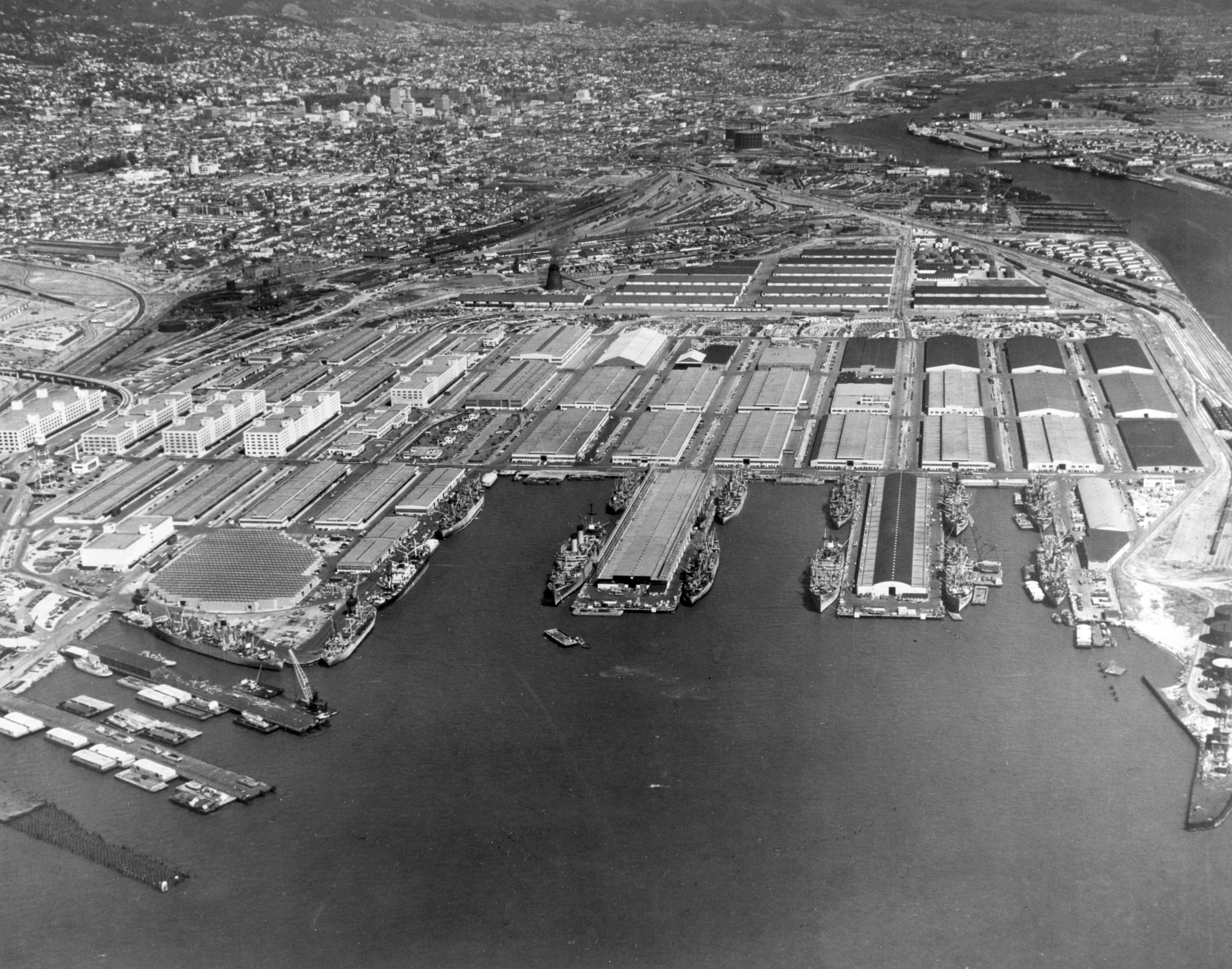
- NSC Oakland, circa in 1950.

Site information
- Type: Navy Base
- Operator: U.S. Navy
- Open to the public: No

Location
- Coordinates: 37°48′10″N 122°18′59″W

Site history
- Built: 1940
- In use: 1940-1998
- Fate: decommissioned

The Fleet and Industrial Supply Center, Oakland was a supply facility operated by the U.S. Navy in Oakland, California. During World War II, it was a major source of supplies and war materials for ships operating in the Pacific.

The Depot had its origin in 1940 when the Navy bought 500 acres (2.0 km^{2}) of wetlands from the city of Oakland for $1.00. The Navy reclaimed the land and populated it with large warehouses. It opened on December 15, 1941, and quickly began a decades-long expansion. In the late 1940s it was renamed Naval Supply Center, Oakland; later it was renamed Fleet and Industrial Supply Center, Oakland. During the Cold War, it was one of the Navy's most important supply facilities.

The 1995 Base Realignment and Closure Commission recommended that the Center be closed. It was closed in 1998, and in 1999, the Navy transferred the entire 531-acre (2.15 km^{2}) property to the Port of Oakland. The new owner plans to develop it for intermodal freight transport involving a marine terminal, railroad, and truck cargo activities. The site is environmentally contaminated due to past activities.

A portion of the supply depot was developed into Middle Harbor Shoreline Park in 2003. Buildings were removed and environmental restoration created new wetlands for wildlife.
