= Atlanta-class cruiser =

Class of light cruisers of the United States Navy

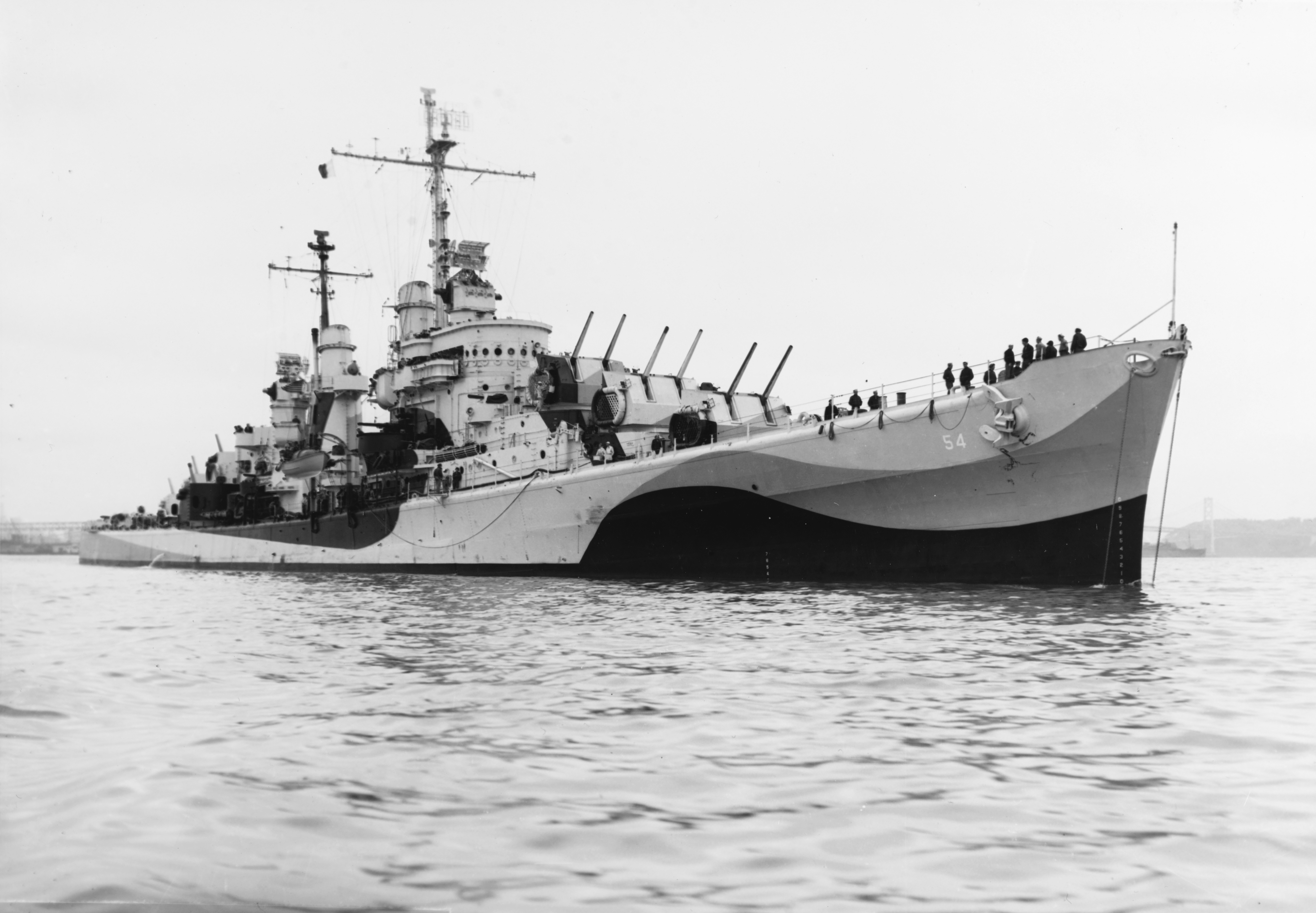
- USS San Juan on 14 October 1944

Class overview
- Name: Atlanta class
- Builders: Federal Shipbuilding, NJ (2); Bethlehem Fore River, MA (2); Bethlehem San Francisco, CA (4)
- Operators: United States Navy
- Preceded by: Brooklyn class
- Succeeded by: Juneau class
- Subclasses: Oakland class
- Built: 1940–1945
- In commission: 1941–1949
- Completed: 8
- Lost: 2
- Retired: 6

General characteristics
- Class & type: Light cruiser
- Displacement: 6,718 long tons (6,826 t) (standard); 7,400 long tons (7,500 t) (full load)
- Length: 530 ft (160 m) wl; 541 ft (165 m) oa
- Beam: 52 ft 10 in (16.10 m)
- Draft: 20 ft 6 in (6.25 m)
- Propulsion: 4 × 665 psi boilers; 2 geared steam turbines; 75,000 hp (56 MW)
- Speed: 32.5 knots (60 km/h) (design); 33.6 knots (62 km/h) (trials)
- Range: 8,500 nautical miles (15,700 km) at 15 knots (28 km/h)
- Boats & landing craft carried: 2–4 × lifeboats
- Complement: As designed: Officer: 35; Enlisted: 638; Oakland class: Officer: 47; Enlisted: 766
- Sensors & processing systems: 2 × Mk37 GFCS; SC search radar; SG-1 surface-search radar
- Armament: As designed: 8 × dual 5"/38 caliber guns; 4 × quad 1.1"/75 caliber guns; 6 × single Oerlikon 20 mm cannons; 2 × quad Mark 15 torpedo torpedo tubes; Oakland class: 6 × dual 5"/38 caliber guns; 8 × dual Bofors 40 mm guns; 16 × single Oerlikon 20 mm cannons; 2 × quad Mark 15 torpedo torpedo tubes
- Armor: Belt: 1.1–3 3/4 in (28–95 mm); Deck: 1 1/4 in (32 mm); Turrets: 1 1/4 in (32 mm); Conning Tower: 2 1/2 in (64 mm)

The Atlanta-class cruisers were eight United States Navy light cruisers which were designed as fast scout cruisers, flotilla leaders, or destroyer leaders, but which proved to be effective anti-aircraft cruisers during World War II. They were also known as the Atlanta-Oakland class. The Atlanta class originally had 16 × 5-inch (127 mm)/38 caliber guns in eight two-gun turrets, arranged with three superfiring turrets forward, three more superfiring aft and two waist mounts, one port and one starboard, giving the first four Atlanta-class cruisers the heaviest anti-aircraft armament of any cruiser of World War II. The last four ships of the class, starting with Oakland, had a slightly revised armament with a reduced main gun battery - the waist turrets being deleted - as they were further optimized for anti-aircraft fire in light of war experience.

The Atlanta class saw heavy action during World War II, collectively earning 54 battle stars. Two ships of the class were sunk in action: Atlanta and Juneau, both at the Naval Battle of Guadalcanal. The other six were decommissioned shortly after the war and were scrapped in the 1960s.

== Specifications ==
As built, the original main gun battery of the first quartet of the Atlanta class was composed of eight dual 5-inch (127 mm)/38 caliber gun mounts (8 × 2 5-inch guns). This battery could fire over 17,600 pounds (8,000 kg) of shells per minute, including the radar-fuzed "VT" anti-aircraft (AA) shells. Fire control was by two Mk 37 fire control systems located on the centerline atop the superstructure. As built, these ships lacked radar but from the spring of 1942 they were re-fitted with FD (Mk 4) fire control radar and SC-1 and SG search radar. From 1943 the FD (Mk 4) radar was replaced by the improved Mk 12/Mk 22 combination.

The first four Atlanta-class cruisers originally had a secondary anti-aircraft armament of twelve 1.1-inch (28 mm)/75 caliber guns in three quad mountings, without directors fitted. By early 1942, as more weapons became available, a fourth quad mount had been installed on the quarterdeck and directors were fitted (probably Mk 44). By late 1942 these troublesome and relatively ineffective weapons began to be replaced in the surviving ships by twin mountings for the new and far superior Bofors 40 mm anti-aircraft guns with Mk 51 directors.

Also from early 1942, close-range AA armament was augmented by eight 20 mm rapid-fire anti-aircraft cannons in single Mk 4 mountings disposed two on the forward superstructure, four amidships between the funnels (displacing some of the ship's boats) and two on the quarterdeck aft. From 1943 onward, two more Mk 4 mountings were added on the forward superstructure and a pair on each side of the second funnel to counter the danger of Japanese air attacks. From the end of 1943, a quadruple 40 mm Bofors mounting replaced the twin mount on the quarterdeck, with the six depth charge projectors being removed as compensation. The additions of radar, additional close-range anti-aircraft guns and other equipment seriously impaired the stability of these ships as the war progressed and resulted in overcrowding as more ratings had to be added to man them.

The second quartet of the Atlanta class, sometimes known as the Oakland class, was commissioned with only six twin 5-inch/38 mounts and with Bofors guns from the start, with four additional twin Bofors 40 mm mounts compared to their predecessors: two displacing the former 5-inch/38 wing turrets (improving both stability and close-range AA firepower while easing congestion) and two between the funnels displacing the previous two pairs of 20 mm Oerlikons. In addition the battery of 20 mm anti-aircraft cannons was increased with a pair on the bow, four on the forward superstructure, eight amidships arrayed on either side of the aft funnel and two on the quarterdeck aft for a total of sixteen.

The Atlanta-class cruisers were the only class of U.S. Navy cruisers commissioned during World War II to be armed with torpedo tubes, with eight 21-inch (533 mm) torpedo tubes in two quad launchers.

By the end of the war USS Oakland had been given an anti-kamikaze upgrade which included replacing the four aft twin Bofors with quad mountings and greatly reducing the number of 20 mm mounts (to possibly as few as six) while replacing those that remained with twin rather than single guns. The torpedo tubes were removed.

Although ships of this class were planned as destroyer flotilla leaders, the original design did not include anti-submarine armament such as sonar or a depth charge battery. In early 1942, along with anti-aircraft and radar upgrades, these ships were fitted with sonar and the standard destroyer battery of six depth charge projectors and two stern mounted tracks. When the vessels were determined to be more valuable as protection against aircraft, the projectors were removed but the tracks were retained. The Oakland sub-class never received the projectors, getting only two stern tracks, probably due to marginal stability.

The class was powered by four 665 psi boilers, connected to two geared steam turbines producing 75,000 horsepower (56,000 kW), and the ships could maintain a top speed of 33.6 knots (62.2 km/h; 38.7 mph). On trial the Atlanta made 33.67 knots (62.36 km/h; 38.75 mph) and 78,985 shp (58,899 kW). The ships of the Atlanta class had thin armor: a maximum of 3.75 inches (95 mm) on their sides covering machinery and magazines, with the 5-inch gun mounts being protected by only 1.25 inches (32 mm) and the conning tower by 2.5 inches (64 mm).

The ships were originally designed for 26 officers and 523 men, but this increased to 35 officers and 638 men with the first four ships, and 45 officers and 766 men with the second group of four ships beginning with Oakland. The ships were also designed as flagships with additional space for a flag officer and his staff but the additional space was used for additional crew necessary to man anti-aircraft weapons and electronics.

== Criticisms ==
Although very formidable as anti-aircraft ships, the Atlanta-class cruisers did not fare well in combat. Of the three light cruisers lost by the U.S. Navy during World War II, two were Atlantas. The only two cruisers of the class that engaged in surface combat were sunk: Atlanta and Juneau. Atlanta was sunk in surface combat during the Guadalcanal campaign while Juneau was heavily damaged in the same battle and sunk by Japanese submarine I-26 on her way back for repairs. Both of these vessels received their fatal blows from Japanese torpedoes, and gunfire from larger, more heavily armed ships. The unique armament of the Atlanta class did not contribute to their loss.

The Atlanta-class design was also criticized for its shortage of gunfire directors for the main 5-inch gun battery, which reduced its effectiveness. Initially there were not enough intermediate anti-aircraft guns (i.e. 1.1 in guns or Bofors 40 mm). These problems were somewhat corrected in naval shipyards by the end of 1942, but the Atlanta-class warships were thereafter overloaded with weight, compared to the size of their hulls. Throughout World War II and the postwar years, they had problems with topside weight; this was addressed by a redesign of the class which was then constructed as the three Juneau-class cruisers.

== Service history ==
All eight ships in this class served during World War II, and six ships survived the war. The lead ship of this class, Atlanta, was laid down on 22 April 1940 and launched on 6 September 1941. Atlanta was commissioned at the New York Navy Yard on 24 December 1941, just a few weeks after the Japanese attack on Pearl Harbor of 7 December. Atlanta participated as an anti-aircraft cruiser in the decisive American victory at the Battle of Midway in June 1942 before she was sent south to fight in the Solomon Islands. Atlanta was scuttled after receiving a torpedo hit and heavy gunfire damage from Japanese surface warships and USS San Francisco on 13 November 1942 during the Naval Battle of Guadalcanal. Juneau was also heavily damaged in surface combat in the same battle and then sunk by the Japanese submarine I-26, on 13 November 1942. Reno was torpedoed off Leyte on 4 November 1944 resulting in a large fire and significant flooding, but was saved from sinking by the damage control efforts of the crew.

After the war, the six surviving ships in this class were decommissioned between 1947 and 1949 and placed in the reserve fleet. The ships received a new type designation of CLAA in 1949. None of these ships were recommissioned to serve in an active role; all were ultimately struck and scrapped by 1970.

== Ships in class ==
Construction details
Ship name	Hull no.	Class/subclass	Builder	Laid down	Launched	Commissioned	Decommissioned	Fate
Atlanta	CL-51	Atlanta	Federal Shipbuilding and Drydock Company, Kearny, New Jersey	22 April 1940	6 September 1941	24 December 1941	—N/a	Sunk, Naval Battle of Guadalcanal, 13 November 1942
Juneau	CL-52	Atlanta	Federal Shipbuilding and Drydock Company, Kearny, New Jersey	27 May 1940	25 October 1941	14 February 1942	—N/a	Sunk, Naval Battle of Guadalcanal, 13 November 1942
San Diego	CL-53	Atlanta	Bethlehem Steel Corporation, Fore River Shipyard, Quincy, Massachusetts	27 March 1940	26 July 1941	10 January 1942	4 November 1946	Struck 1 March 1959; Sold for scrap, 3 February 1960
San Juan	CL-54	Atlanta	Bethlehem Steel Corporation, Fore River Shipyard, Quincy, Massachusetts	15 May 1940	6 September 1941	28 February 1942	9 November 1946	Struck 1 May 1959; Sold for scrap, 31 October 1961
Oakland	CL-95	Oakland (subclass)	Bethlehem Steel Corporation, San Francisco, California	15 July 1941	23 October 1942	17 July 1943	1 July 1949	Struck 1 March 1959; Sold for scrap, 1 December 1959
Reno	CL-96	Oakland (subclass)	Bethlehem Steel Corporation, San Francisco, California	1 August 1941	23 December 1942	28 December 1943	4 November 1946	Struck 1 March 1959; Sold for scrap 22 March 1962
Flint	CL-97	Oakland (subclass)	Bethlehem Steel Corporation, San Francisco, California	23 October 1942	25 January 1944	31 August 1944	6 May 1947	Struck 1 June 1965; Sold for scrap 6 October 1966
Tucson	CL-98	Oakland (subclass)	Bethlehem Steel Corporation, San Francisco, California	23 December 1942	3 September 1944	3 February 1945	11 June 1949	Struck 1 June 1966; Sold for scrap 24 February 1971

== See also ==
- The Cruiser-Destroyer and the CL-154-class cruiser, attempts to create a "super-Atlanta" by replacing the Atlanta's 5-inch/38-caliber gun with the longer-range and faster firing 5-inch/54-caliber Mark 16 gun
- Worcester-class cruiser, an enlarged version of the Atlanta class, with almost identical configuration, minus the secondary batteries.
- Dido-class cruiser, a contemporary British cruiser of similar size, role and configuration
- List of cruisers of the United States Navy
- List of ship classes of World War II
