= Phil Tagami =

American politician (born 1965)

Phillip H. Tagami (born 1965) is an American investor, politician, land developer and executive. He is the CEO of California Commercial and Investment Group and managing general partner for California Capital Group.

== Biography ==
Tagami was born in Oakland, California in 1965. The son of an auto-mechanic, Tadao "Frank" Tagami, he received an athletic scholarship to attend St. James boarding school in Maryland, but left at 16 to live briefly with his mother in Berkeley, California before moving to West Berkeley on his own. A series of odd jobs, as an aerobics instructor, a roadie for several bay area bands, with Bill Graham Presents, and as a lacrosse coach led him into construction and building management. At age 23 he worked for Randall Berger and in 1990 managed the renovation the Lake Merritt Hotel for Berger. In 1992 at the age of 27, Tagami and partners Epstein and Moss formed the California Capital Group, a development business and in 2009 incorporated as California Capital and Investment Group.

== Development ==
Tagami rose to local prominence in 1998 as a real estate developer when he and his partners secured the right to renovate the historic Liberty House department store situated across the street from Oakland's City Hall. The $50 million renovations to the building that followed produced the Rotunda, which according to a 2005 article in the San Francisco Business Times was "widely regarded as the city's most attractive office complex." Tagami was selected for prominent restorations including the Fox Theater and the historic West Oakland train station, although the latter project never materialized.

In 2009, Tagami and the California Capital Group were endorsed by a committee chosen by Oakland Mayor Ron Dellums to redevelop 135 acres (0.55 km^{2}) of the former Oakland Army Base. The base was divided in 2002, with 135 acres (0.55 km^{2}) given to the city of Oakland and 168 to the Port of Oakland. Tagami, in conjunction with the San Francisco maritime developer AMB, is also a front-runner for the port's renovation project.

In 2015, Tagami became involved in controversy surrounding the potential shipment of coal from the re-developed Oakland Army Base. Concerns over the effects of coal shipments on local air quality and global climate change led to increasing concern among both activists and Oakland politicians. Oakland Mayor Libby Schaaf asked Tagami to live up to his verbal agreement not to ship coal from the base.

In June, 2016, the matter came to a head when the Oakland City Council acted on a proposal by Mayor Libby Schaaf and Councilman Dan Kalb to prohibit coal and petroleum coke trains from bringing coal to be shipped from Oakland. Schaaf and Kalb, along with medical, public health, neighborhood and union officials, advocated for their measure by arguing that these fossil fuels pollute the air and pose serious risks to workers and nearby residents. Subsequently, the Oakland City Council unanimously voted to ban the local storage and shipment of coal. On December 7, 2016 Tagami sued the city over its action. Tagami is seeking to overturn the ban on exporting fossil fuels and allow his company, Oakland Bulk Oversized Terminal, to ship coal and petroleum coke from the Port of Oakland, according to court documents.

== Politics ==
Tagami served as an Oakland Planning Commissioner appointed by Mayor Elihu Harris.

Subsequently, Tagami earned a further reputation as a political insider, with particularly close connections to Jerry Brown, Gray Davis and Don Perata.

Brown appointed Tagami to the Board of Commissioners of the Port of Oakland, where he served from 2000-2003.

Tagami went on to serve as a world trade commissioner and a state parks commissioner for Governor Grey Davis.

In 2005, as Brown was preparing to leave the mayoral office, Tagami indicated that he was considering running for public office, possibly starting with City Council before putting in a bid to serve Oakland as mayor.

In 2008, Tagami attracted media attention when he publicly requested that the city council revise the city charter to require weekly timesheets from the mayor, demonstrating that the mayor serves a 40-hour workweek. This announcement followed on allegations by KTVU news that for a third of record workday Mayor Ron Dellum's calendar could only verify his working four hours or less. Tagami announced that he was considering a spring 2010 ballot if the city council did not alter the charter.

In 2011, Tagami was appointed to the California Lottery by Governor Jerry Brown. In May 2012 other lottery commissioners voted Tagami chairman for a one-year term.
