= USS Flint (CL-97) =

Atlanta-class light cruiser

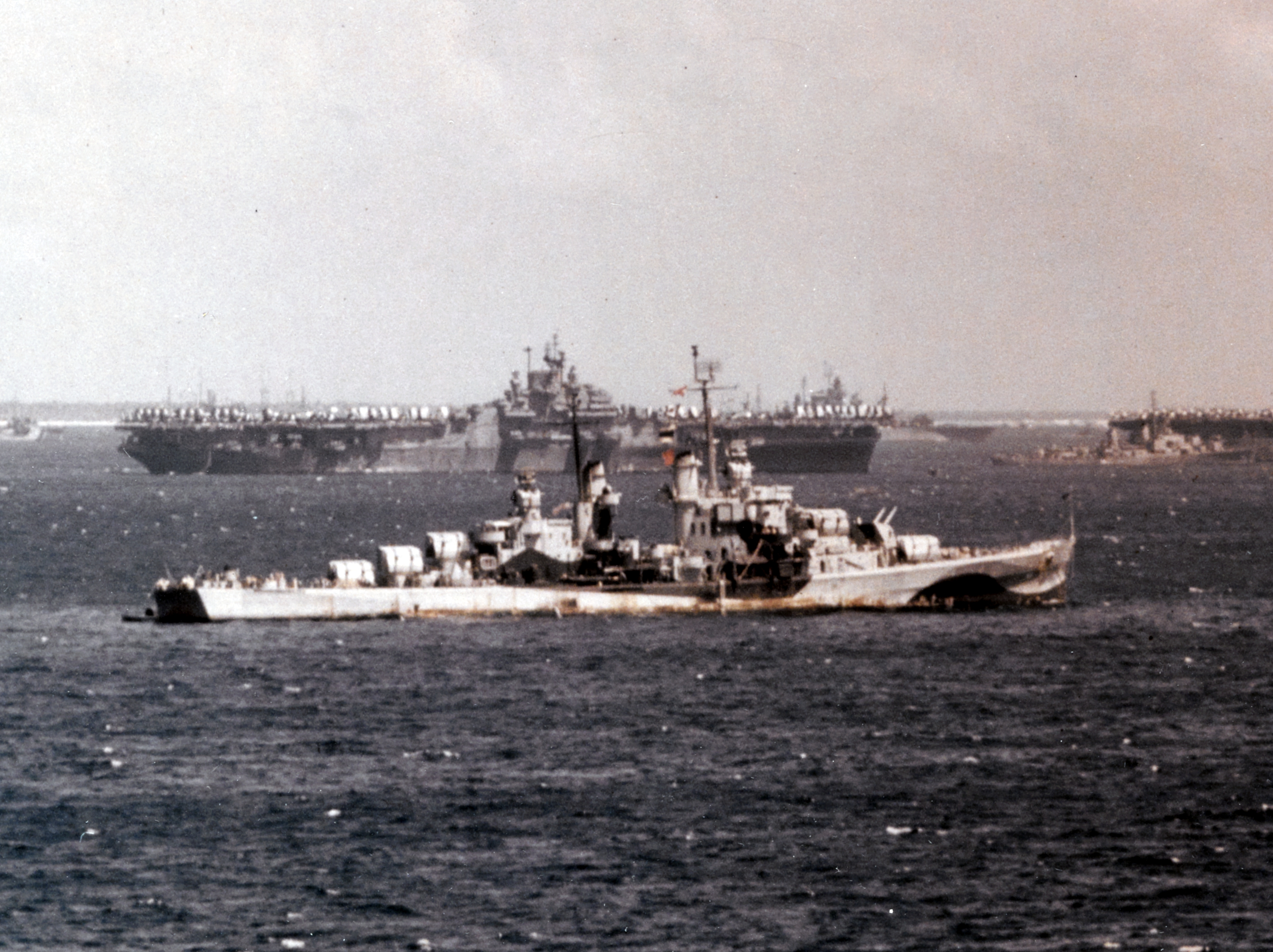
- USS Flint (March 1945)

History

United States
- Name: Flint
- Namesake: City of Flint, Michigan
- Builder: Bethlehem Shipbuilding Corporation, San Francisco, California
- Laid down: 1 August 1941
- Launched: 25 January 1944
- Commissioned: 31 August 1944
- Decommissioned: 6 May 1947
- Reclassified: CLAA-97 18 March 1949
- Stricken: 1 June 1965
- Identification: Hull symbol:CL-97; Hull symbol:CLAA-97; Code letters:NBQU
- Honors and awards: 4 × battle stars
- Fate: Sold for scrap on 6 October 1966

General characteristics (as built)
- Class & type: Atlanta-class light cruiser
- Displacement: 6,718 long tons (6,826 t) (standard); 8,340 long tons (8,470 t) (max)
- Length: 541 ft 6 in (165.05 m) oa
- Beam: 53 ft (16 m)
- Draft: 20 ft 6 in (6.25 m) (mean); 26 ft 6 in (8.08 m) (max)
- Installed power: 4 × Steam boilers; 75,000 shp (56,000 kW)
- Propulsion: 2 × geared turbines; 2 × screws
- Speed: 32.5 kn (37.4 mph; 60.2 km/h)
- Complement: 688 officers and enlisted
- Armament: 12 × 5 in (127 mm)/38 caliber Mark 12 guns (6×2); 8 × dual 40 mm (1.6 in) Bofors anti-aircraft guns; 16 × 20 mm/70 cal anti-aircraft cannons; 8 × 21 in (533 mm) torpedo tubes; 6 × depth charge projectors; 2 × depth charge tracks
- Armor: Belt: 1.1–3 3/4 in (28–95 mm); Deck: 1 1/4 in (32 mm); Turrets: 1 1/4 in (32 mm); Conning Tower: 2 1/2 in (64 mm)

USS Flint (CL-97) was a modified Atlanta-class light cruiser, sometimes referred to as an "Oakland-class". She was named after the city of Flint, Michigan. She was launched on 25 January 1944 by Bethlehem Shipbuilding Corporation of San Francisco, California, sponsored by Mrs. R. A. Pitcher. She was commissioned on 31 August 1944. She was reclassified CLAA-97 on 18 March 1949.

== Service history ==
Flint reported to the 3rd Fleet for duty at Ulithi on 27 December 1944, and six days later, sailed with Task Force 38 (TF 38) for a month-long cruise in support of the invasion of Luzon. She screened aircraft carriers as they launched strikes on Luzon, Taiwan, and the China coast, and fired protective anti-aircraft cover during a Japanese kamikaze attack on 21 January 1945. Replenishing at Ulithi from 26 January to 10 February, Flint then sailed with newly designated TF 38 for air strikes on Tokyo preceding the attack on Iwo Jima. Her force arrived off Iwo Jima on 21 February to provide anti-aircraft cover for the Marines who had landed two days previously, and Flint returned to Ulithi 12 March for a brief 2 days of replenishment.

Putting to sea with TF 58 for strikes against Kyūshū in preparation for the invasion of Okinawa, Flint aided in bringing down several airplanes in heavy attacks on the task force from 18 to 22 March. The task force then closed Okinawa, and Flint with other cruisers bombarded beach installations in preparation for the landings on 1 April. Aside from the period of 14–24 May, when she was at Ulithi for upkeep, Flint operated off Okinawa until 13 June, when she anchored in Leyte Gulf.

Flint sortied from Leyte on 1 July to screen the final air attacks on the Japanese home islands and to join the bombardment of the east coast of Honshū until the cessation of hostilities. On 24 August, she took station off Nii Shima to serve as rescue ship and homing station for transport planes carrying occupation troops to Japan. From 10 to 15 September, she lay in Tokyo Bay, then sailed with a carrier task force to provide air and sea surveillance of Central Honshū until 21 September.

The cruiser made a voyage from Japan to Eniwetok, then loaded homeward bound servicemen at Yokosuka on 13 October, bringing them into San Francisco Bay on 28 November. After sailing to Kwajalein to bring home more servicemen eligible for discharge, Flint reported at Puget Sound Naval Shipyard, Bremerton, Washington, on 11 January 1946, and there was placed out of commission in reserve at Bremerton on 6 May 1947. Her dedication plaque currently rests in the Sloan Museum, in the city she is named after.

== Awards ==
Flint received four battle stars for World War II service.
