= USS Oakland (CL-95) =

Atlanta-class light cruiser

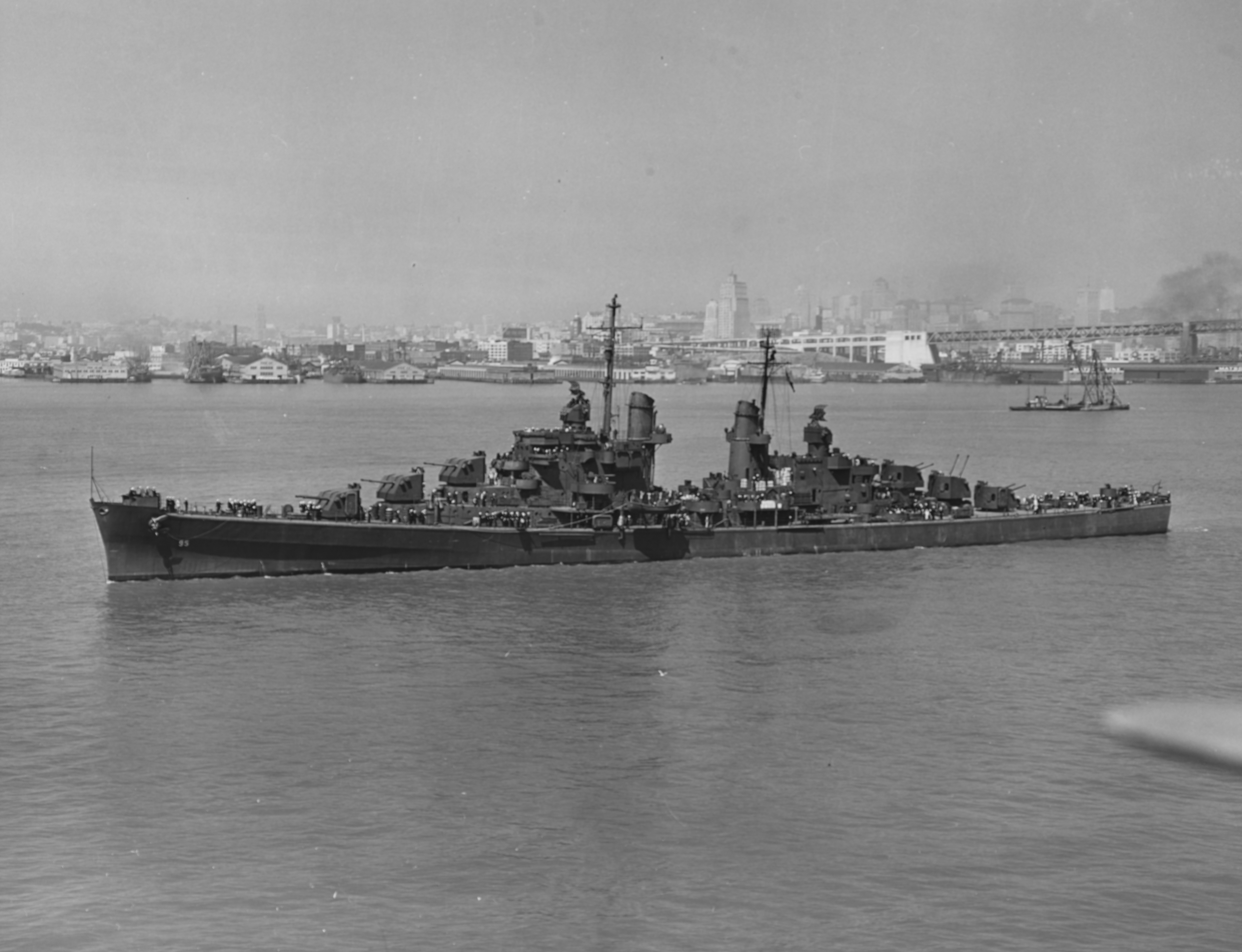
- USS Oakland (August 1943)

History

United States
- Name: Oakland
- Namesake: City of Oakland, California
- Builder: Bethlehem Shipbuilding Corporation, San Francisco, California
- Laid down: 15 July 1941
- Launched: 23 October 1942
- Sponsored by: Dr. Aurelia Henry Reinhardt
- Commissioned: 17 June 1943
- Decommissioned: 1 July 1949
- Reclassified: CLAA-95, 18 March 1949
- Stricken: 1 March 1959
- Identification: Hull symbol:CL-95; Hull symbol:CLAA-95; Code letters:NBSM
- Honors and awards: 9 × battle stars
- Fate: Sold for scrap, 1 December 1959

General characteristics (as built)
- Class & type: Atlanta-class light cruiser
- Displacement: 6,718 long tons (6,826 t) (standard); 8,340 long tons (8,470 t) (max)
- Length: 541 ft 6 in (165.05 m) oa
- Beam: 53 ft (16 m)
- Draft: 20 ft 6 in (6.25 m) (mean); 26 ft 6 in (8.08 m) (max)
- Installed power: 4 × Steam boilers; 75,000 shp (56,000 kW)
- Propulsion: 2 × geared turbines; 2 × screws
- Speed: 32.5 kn (37.4 mph; 60.2 km/h)
- Complement: 802 officers and enlisted
- Armament: 12 × 5 in (127 mm)/38 caliber Mark 12 guns (6×2); 8 × dual 40 mm (1.6 in) Bofors anti-aircraft guns; 14 × 20 mm Oerlikon anti-aircraft cannons; 8 × 21 in (533 mm) torpedo tubes; 6 × depth charge projectors; 2 × depth charge tracks
- Armor: Belt: 1.1–3 3/4 in (28–95 mm); Deck: 1 1/4 in (32 mm); Turrets: 1 1/4 in (32 mm); Conning Tower: 2 1/2 in (64 mm)

General characteristics (1945)
- Armament: 12 × 5 in (127 mm)/38 caliber Mark 12 guns (6×2); 4 × quad 40 mm (1.6 in) Bofors anti-aircraft guns; 4 × twin 40 mm (1.6 in) Bofors anti-aircraft guns; 16 × 20 mm (0.79 in) Oerlikon anti-aircraft cannons; 6 × depth charge projectors; 2 × depth charge tracks

USS Oakland (CL-95), was a modified Atlanta-class light cruiser, the first of a group of four sometimes referred to as the "Oakland-class". She was laid down by Bethlehem Shipbuilding Corporation, San Francisco, California, on 15 July 1941; launched on 23 October 1942; sponsored by Dr. Aurelia Henry Reinhardt, president of Mills College, Oakland, California; and commissioned on 17 July 1943. She was named for the city of Oakland, California. Like the Atlanta class, the Oakland class was designed as an anti-aircraft cruiser, with a main battery of dual-purpose guns, the principal difference between the two classes being that the Oakland-class did not have the Atlanta class's two-beam twin 5 in (127 mm)/38 cal gun turrets. They were removed for the sake of stability and the limited arcs of fire experienced by the wing turrets on the Atlantas. Oakland sustained three casualties during World War II.

== Service history ==
=== World War II ===
==== 1943 ====
Following a shakedown and training cruise off San Diego in the summer of 1943, Oakland sailed back to Pearl Harbor arriving on 3 November. Joining with three heavy cruisers and two destroyers, she linked up with Task Group 50.3 (TG 50.3) near Funafuti in the Ellice Islands, for support of Operation Galvanic, the amphibious push into the Gilbert Islands. The carriers launched initial air strikes against Kwajalein Atoll on 19 November. More than fifty Japanese G4M torpedo bombers were left intact on Kwajalein, yet despite objections of the involved air crews the carriers failed to follow up on the raid. This inaction allowed the previously identified wing of torpedo bombers from Kwajalein to attack the formation during the evening and night of the 20th. In this action, the skipper of the Oakland asked for clearance to fall back from the formation and activate Oakland’s running lights in order to draw the attention away from the task force. The ploy succeeded, and the Oakland scored two kills and two assists in fighting off the raiders.

On 26 November, northeast of the Marshall Islands, Oakland again fought off strong coordinated torpedo plane attacks. At 2332 on 4 December, a torpedo tore into the side of Lexington, damaging steering control and Oakland covered her slow withdrawal, arriving Pearl Harbor on 9 December.

==== 1944 ====
Oakland departed Pearl Harbor on 16 January 1944 with the carriers of TG 58.1 headed for the Marshall Islands. The task group launched strikes against Maloelap on 29 January and against Kwajalein on the 30th. An amphibious assault was made on Kwajalein on 1 February. Oakland with her carriers supported American operations ashore until they entered Majuro Lagoon on 4 February.

Weighing anchor on 12 February, the ships of TG 58.1 sailed from Majuro and launched air strikes against Truk on 16–17 February, greatly damaging the important Japanese naval base there.

Then, despite a night-long series of Japanese aerial attacks on 21–22 February, to hit the Marianas with damaging blows, Oakland's gunners bagged two more enemy planes and assisted in splashing two others before returning to Majuro.

Oakland sortied with TG 58.1 on 7 March, bound for Espiritu Santo in the New Hebrides. The group skirted the Solomons and covered the occupation of Emirau Island, north of New Britain, on the 20th. On the 27th, the task group swept on to the western Carolines. Heavy air attacks greeted the carriers, but Oakland and her partners in the screen fought them off before any damage was incurred. They pounded Palau on 30 March, Yap on the 31st and Woleai on 1 April, before returning to Majuro on 6 April.

Through April the group carried out similar operations at Wake Island and Samar. They again hammered Truk on the 29th-30th, as well as hitting Satawan on the later date. Allied surface and aerial bombardment battered Ponape on 1 May, before Oakland retired to Kwajalein on 4 May.

Following anti-aircraft training, Oakland helped to attack Guam on 11 June, then steamed north to hit the Volcano and Bonin Islands by the 14th.

West of the embattled Marianas, Task Force 58 (TF 58) sped to intercept a large Japanese surface force approaching from the Philippines. In the ensuing Battle of the Philippine Sea, the famed "Turkey Shoot" took place as US planes decimated the trained air groups of three Japanese carrier divisions, almost eliminating Japanese naval aviation.

Toward the end of the battle, as darkness was creeping in, the returning American pilots were scanning the sea for their carriers. Admiral Mitscher, on the bridge of his flagship, concerned about his men, gave the order "Turn on the lights." In response, Oakland's 36 in (910 mm) searchlights were turned on, helping to light up the Philippine Sea.

TG 58.1 next struck at Pagan Island on 23 June and Iwo Jima the next day. On the 27th, the units gathered at Eniwetok Atoll for replenishment, and on the 30th nosed northwest to the Bonin Islands. The group delivered a withering air-sea bombardment against Iwo and Chichi Jima on 3–4 July, and by the 5th was speeding south for a return engagement in the Marianas.

On 7 July, the carriers began launching a series of alternating strikes against Guam and Rota. Oakland and Helm teamed up to recover downed pilots off Guam, and fired at targets on Orote Peninsula.

At 0800 on 4 August, search planes reported a Japanese convoy zig-zagging out of Chichi Jima Bonin Islands. Two hours later, the carriers' planes reported they were attacking enemy vessels. An attack group was quickly formed, consisting of Oakland, Santa Fe, Mobile and Biloxi, and Destroyer Division 91.

Detached from the task group at 1241, the killer band raced at 30 kn (35 mph; 56 km/h) between Ototo and Yome Jima and arrived on the scene at about 1730. The destroyers formed an attack group ahead of the cruisers and, at 1845, sank a small oiler. Another straggler from the convoy, later identified as the destroyer Matsu, was sighted at 1924 and subsequently sunk.

At 2145, Oakland and company contacted a 7500-ton supply ship and sank her, before turning south to rake Chichi Jima. Oakland made three runs shelling shipping in Chichi's harbor of Funtami Ko, and helped to silence a shore battery before she retired at 1119 on 5 August. Several Japanese ships had been sunk, a seaplane base damaged, and fires started among the wharves and warehouses.

From 6–8 September, Oakland's task group hit the Palau Islands, Peleliu being the main target. On the evening of the 8th, they steamed west to raid enemy airfields in the Philippines through the 22nd.

On 6 October, Oakland departed Ulithi shepherding her own carriers toward the Ryukyu Islands and hit Okinawa on the 10th. They attacked installations on Formosa and the Pescadores on 12 October and, at 1835, as they were withdrawing, fought off Japanese air counterattack.

They hit Formosa again on 13 October, and again the Imperial Air Force lashed out in full fury as the task force withdrew at nightfall. Oakland assisted in turning back the aerial opponents but, at 1835, Canberra in TG 38.1 was damaged by a torpedo, and on the 14th Houston received a torpedo hit. Oakland then covered the withdrawal of the two hit ships, before participating in the strikes against Luzon from 17–19 October and supporting the landings on Leyte the 20th.

En route to Ulithi on the 24th, Oakland received orders to backtrack at once to help stop the Japanese Fleet which was converging on Leyte Gulf. By the time she arrived on the scene, the enemy had been repulsed, and the carriers began long range strikes against the retreating enemy. The Battle for Leyte Gulf was essentially the end of the Imperial Navy as an effective fighting force.

From November–December, Oakland operated with various task groups of TF 38 supporting the Philippine liberation campaign. On 18 December, she rode out a raging typhoon in the Philippine Sea escaping serious damage.

==== 1945 ====
Oakland returned to San Francisco on 11 January 1945. She remained for repairs and trial runs until sailing for Hawaii on 4 March. Arriving Pearl Harbor on the 9th, Oakland began additional training south of Oahu. She received movement orders on the 14th and sailed for Ulithi, the staging area for Okinawa.

Reaching Ulithi on 30 March, she sailed again with other units the following day. On tap was the most ambitious amphibious assault of the Pacific war. On 2 April, the group separated, Oakland going ahead to join TG 58.4. For five days, she engaged in hitting Sakashima Gunto in the southern Nansei Shoto and then proceeded to Okinawa.

On 10 April, Oakland was reassigned to TG 58.3 for the remainder of the Okinawa campaign. She came under air attack again on 11 April with her gunners splashing a dive bomber.

With other groups of TF 58, Oakland moved northward on 15 April to launch strikes against airfields at Kyūshū. Enemy planes tried time and again to pierce the task force's protective fighter umbrella. Twice Oakland's guns opened up, aiding in the destruction of one "Frances" and driving off another.

Okinawan defenses were struck again on the 17th. Kamikazes evaded the combat air patrol in the morning and Oakland took two under fire as they passed over the ship. Both were dropped within the formation, with Oakland scoring one. On the 29th, Oakland drove away another enemy aircraft. TG 58.3 had taken the best the Imperial Air Force had to offer during 11 days of April. The rest of the month was utilized in making additional strikes against Okinawa and conducting gunnery exercises with drones and towed sleeves.

Snooper planes began winging near the group early in the morning on 11 May. After breakfast, the Oakland crew scrambled to General Quarters but an attack failed to materialize at that time. Two kamikazes plummeted into the flight deck of Bunker Hill 2,000 yd (1,800 m) from the cruiser. A trio of life rafts were cut loose from Oakland to aid in the rescue of Bunker Hill survivors sighted ahead.

The task force struck again at airfields on Kyūshū on 13 May. On the 14th, the Japanese reciprocated. Shortly after breakfast, a lone Zero was spotted circling through the clouds and Oakland's guns quickly opened fire, but their quarry just as quickly disappeared from view. Then he came back like a comet. Enterprise bore the brunt of his crash-dive as he blew up in a blossom of flame on her flight deck.

Shortly, a flock of kamikazes appeared, and within the space of 15 minutes, Oakland took four separate kamikazes under fire. Oakland's claim of two assists was substantiated by the task group commander.

For the duration of May, Oakland remained with the task group off Okinawa. On the 29th she shifted back to TG 38.1 under Admiral Halsey and made for Leyte Gulf, anchoring in San Pedro Bay on 1 June.

On 10 July, TG 38.1 commenced raids on the Japanese mainland beginning with Honshū and then thundering north to Hokkaidō. From 17–20 July, Oakland participated in strikes against Tokyo and 24–27 July against Kure and Kobe. Tokyo was hit again on the 30th along with Nagoya. On 7 August, the ships turned north to strike the Honshū-Hokkaido area for a second time. 15 August brought the long-awaited "cease all offensive operations" order. Oakland then proceeded to her assigned operating area for the occupation of Japan.

She moved to Tokyo Bay on 30 August and, while anchored near the Yokosuka Naval Base. Berthed several thousand yards away from USS Missouri (BB-63), Oakland provided a box seat for her sailors to witness the unforgettable climax to their war.

=== Post-war ===
While Oakland lay at anchor in Tokyo Bay on the night of 27 September, a typhoon swept close to the harbor entrance. A tanker dragged anchor and struck Oakland's bow, causing minor damage.

On 1 October, Oakland sailed for Okinawa to embark homeward bound veterans for a "magic carpet" voyage to San Francisco. Leaving Okinawa on 3 October, she arrived at San Francisco on 20 October. Navy Day (27 October) observances at Oakland, California, were highlighted by the presence of Oakland. "Magic carpet" duty in November and December took Oakland back to the Pacific twice, first to Eniwetok and then to Kwajalein. At the year's end, the Navy turned the task of bringing home the veterans solely over to its transportation service, and Oakland was ordered to an inactivation area at Bremerton, Washington.

Reprieve came in the form of a change in orders and, instead of inactivation, Oakland was slated to continue as an active postwar fleet unit. A thorough overhaul was afforded her at the Puget Sound Navy Yard to erase the effects of long months of battle.

On 6 January 1947, Oakland got underway for her first post-war cruise to the Far East. After a stop at Pearl Harbor on the 14th, the light cruiser conducted a two-month fleet exercise in the Marianas and Marshall Islands, visiting Guam, Saipan and Kwajalein before returning to Pearl Harbor on 11 March. Instead of returning to San Diego, however, Oakland was ordered east to China, where American support for the Nationalist Chinese in the Civil War against the communist Chinese was growing following the collapse of mediation efforts. Arriving at Tsing-tao on 30 March, Oakland became the flagship of Capt. Sherman R. Clark, commander, Destroyer Flotilla Three. The light cruiser operated out of that port and Shanghai, for the next three months, conducting almost a dozen patrols in the East China Sea. Tensions were particularly high in May, as communist forces threatened the U.S. consulate at Peking, and American forces in China were placed on high alert. As part of that response, Oakland supplied a small landing force of sailors to help out the Marines in Tsing-tao. Tensions eased in June and the light cruiser departed China on 20 July, stopping at Yokosuka and Pearl Harbor before arriving at San Diego on 8 August.

On 18 March, Oakland was reclassified CLAA-95. On 1 July 1949, Oakland decommissioned at San Francisco. Struck on 1 March 1959, she was sold to Louis Simons on 1 December for scrapping. Scrapping was completed by the end of 1962.

Oakland's mast and nameplate were restored and given to the city of Oakland. In July 2002, they were installed in the Port of Oakland's Middle Harbor Shoreline Park, on the western waterfront, at the site of the former Fleet and Industrial Supply Center.

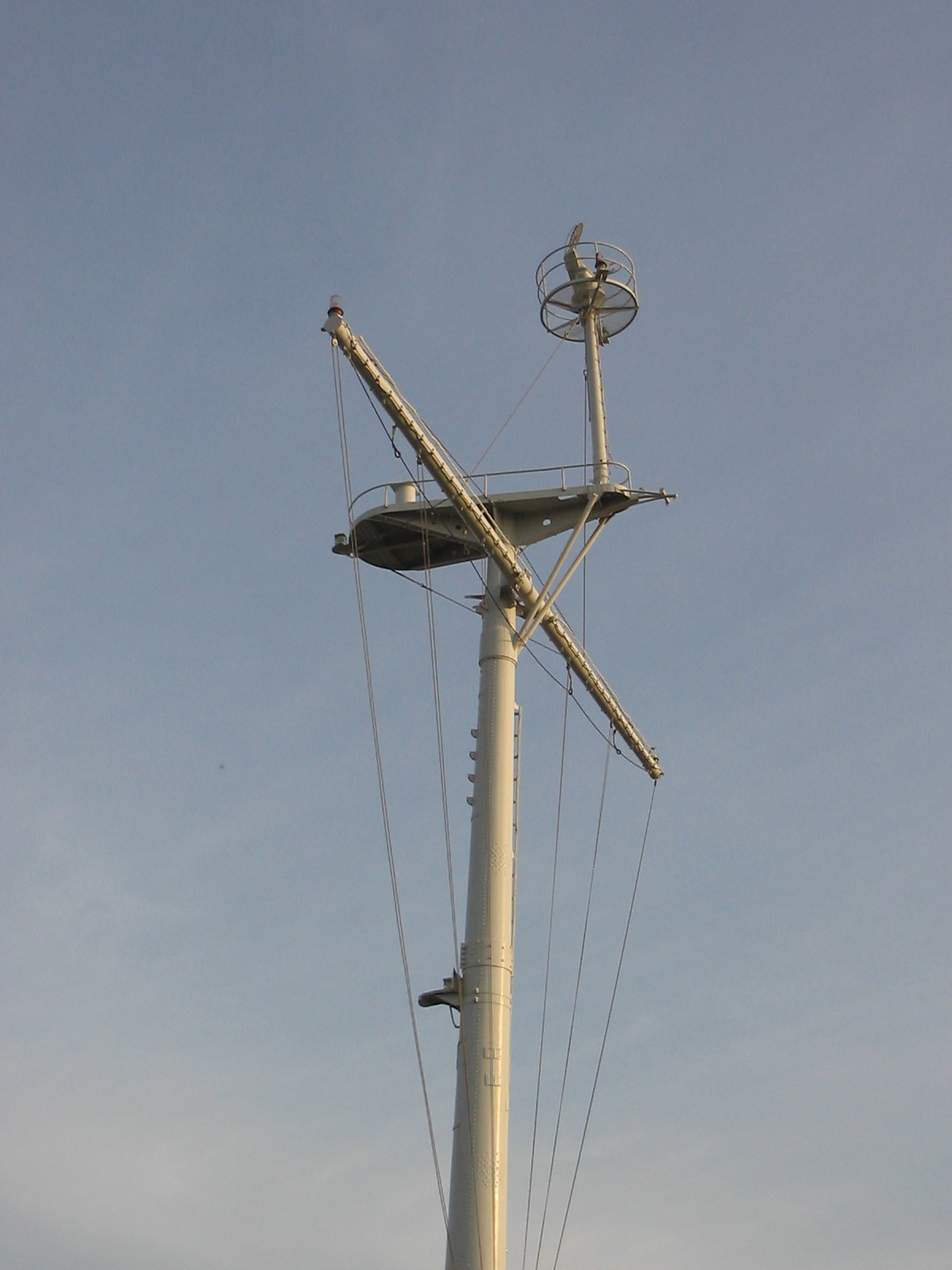
The mast of the USS Oakland at the Middle Harbor Shoreline Park in Oakland, CA.

== Awards ==
- Asiatic-Pacific Campaign Medal with nine battle stars
- World War II Victory Medal
- Navy Occupation Medal with "ASIA" clasp
- China Service Medal
