= USS Tucson (CL-98) =

Atlanta-class light cruiser

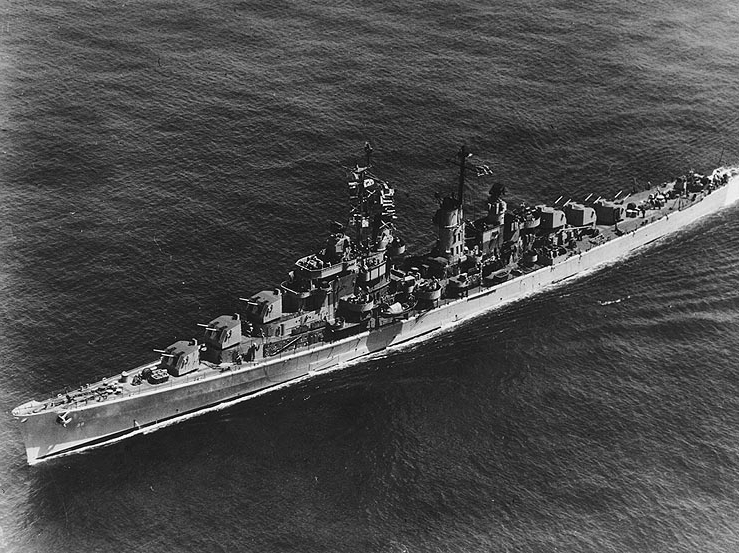
- USS Tucson (circa late 1940s)

History

United States
- Name: Tucson
- Namesake: City of Tucson, Arizona
- Builder: Bethlehem Shipbuilding Corporation, San Francisco, California
- Laid down: 23 December 1942
- Launched: 3 September 1944
- Sponsored by: Mrs. Emmett S. Claunch, Sr.
- Commissioned: 3 February 1945
- Decommissioned: 11 June 1949
- Reclassified: CLAA-98 18 March 1949
- Stricken: 1 June 1966
- Identification: Hull symbol:CL-98; Hull symbol:CLAA-98; Code letters:NBRQ
- Honors and awards: 1 × battle stars
- Fate: Sold for scrap on 24 February 1971

General characteristics (as built)
- Class & type: Atlanta-class light cruiser
- Displacement: 6,718 long tons (6,826 t) (standard); 8,340 long tons (8,470 t) (max)
- Length: 541 ft 6 in (165.05 m) oa
- Beam: 53 ft (16 m)
- Draft: 20 ft 6 in (6.25 m) (mean); 26 ft 6 in (8.08 m) (max)
- Installed power: 4 × Steam boilers; 75,000 shp (56,000 kW)
- Propulsion: 2 × geared turbines; 2 × screws
- Speed: 32.5 kn (37.4 mph; 60.2 km/h)
- Complement: 688 officers and enlisted
- Armament: 12 × 5 in (127 mm)/38 caliber Mark 12 guns (6×2); 8 × dual 40 mm (1.6 in) Bofors anti-aircraft guns; 16 × 20 mm (0.79 in) Oerlikon anti-aircraft cannons; 8 × 21 in (533 mm) torpedo tubes (removed before end of World War II); 6 × depth charge projectors; 2 × depth charge tracks
- Armor: Belt: 1.1–3 3/4 in (28–95 mm); Deck: 1 1/4 in (32 mm); Turrets: 1 1/4 in (32 mm); Conning Tower: 2 1/2 in (64 mm)

USS Tucson (CL-98/CLAA-98) was a modified Atlanta-class light cruiser, sometimes referred to as an "Oakland-class". She was laid down on 23 December 1942 in San Francisco, California, by the Bethlehem Steel Corporation; launched on 3 September 1944; sponsored by Mrs. Emmett S. Claunch, Sr.; and commissioned on 3 February 1945. She was named after Tucson, Arizona. She, along with the surviving Atlanta-class, was reclassified a light antiaircraft cruiser (CLAA) on 18 March 1949, prior to her decommissioning on 18 June 1949.

== Service history ==
=== World War II ===
Following outfitting at San Francisco and shakedown out of San Diego, Tucson sailed for the western Pacific on 8 May. She stopped at Pearl Harbor on 13 May for three weeks of additional training before resuming her voyage west on 2 June. She stopped overnight at Ulithi on 13 June and 14 June, then continued on to the Philippines, and reached Leyte on 16 June. The cruiser was assigned to the screen of the Task Force 38 (TF 38), specifically to that of Rear Admiral Gerald F. Bogan's Task Group 38.3 (TG 38.3) built around Essex, Ticonderoga, Randolph, Monterey, and Bataan.

Tucson joined the fast carriers just in time to participate in their final campaign against the Japanese Empire and its inner defenses. On 1 July, she sortied from Leyte Gulf with TF 38 and headed north to the Japanese home islands. On 10 July, the flattops launched planes against Tokyo. On 14–15 July, TF 38's air groups struck Hokkaidō and northern Honshū. They returned to southern Honshū on 17–18 July to blast Tokyo again and then left the area for almost a week. On 24 July and 28 July, she appeared with the carriers south of Shikoku while their planes hit shipping in the Inland Sea. On 30 July, they zeroed in on Kobe and Nagoya. After that, they retired south to fuel and replenish before striking out northward. By the second week of August, Tucson was off northern Honshū screening the carriers while their planes pounded the island once more. She then accompanied them south to pummel Tokyo again on 13 August. Two days later, Japan capitulated.

=== Post-war service ===
Though hostilities had ceased in mid-August and the Japanese had surrendered formally on 2 September, Tucson remained in the Far East, steaming with TF 38 to the east of Honshū, covering the occupation forces moving into Japan. On 20 September, she cleared area and, two days later, stopped at Okinawa before shaping a course back to the United States. En route, she called at Pearl Harbor and then arrived in San Francisco on 5 October. On 23 October, the warship headed down the coast to San Pedro, where she participated in the Navy Day celebration on 27–28 October. On 29 October, she shifted to San Diego where she reported for duty with Pacific Fleet Training Command as an antiaircraft gunnery training ship. Between November 1945 and August 1946, the antiaircraft cruiser trained about 5,000 officers and men in the use of 5 in (127 mm), 40 mm, and 20 mm anti-aircraft guns. She interrupted her training duties periodically to represent the Navy at special events held in various ports on the Pacific coast.

On 6 September, she entered the Puget Sound Naval Shipyard for a three-month overhaul to get ready for duty under the Commander, Destroyers, Pacific Fleet. For the next two months, Tucson trained out of San Diego in preparation for a fleet exercise to be conducted near Hawaii. On 24 February 1947, the cruiser stood out of San Diego and cruised Hawaiian waters as an element of the force charged with the defense of the islands against an aggressor force moving in from the western Pacific. At the completion of the exercise, the warship put into Pearl Harbor on 11 March. However, she got underway again on 18 March to participate in the fruitless search to the northwest of Hawaii for survivors of the wrecked SS Fort Dearborn.

On 27 March, Tucson returned to San Diego and resumed normal west coast operations until late summer. She again departed the west coast on 28 July and proceeded, via Pearl Harbor, to the Far East, arriving at Yokosuka, Japan, on 15 August. For the next two months, the warship cruised the waters of the Yellow Sea and the East China Sea making observations during the Communist-Nationalist struggle for supremacy in Manchuria and northern China. During that period, she visited Shanghai twice and Tsingtao once. Tucson returned to Yokosuka on 19 October, stayed overnight, and sailed the next day for the United States, arriving at San Diego on 6 November. The cruiser resumed west coast operations and, for the brief remainder of her active career, remained so engaged.

On 9 February 1949, Tucson reported to Mare Island Naval Shipyard to begin preparations for inactivation. Like the other Atlanta-class cruisers, Tucson was reclassified as a light antiaircraft cruiser (CLAA) on 18 March 1949. On 11 June 1949, she was decommissioned and berthed with the San Francisco Group of the Pacific Reserve Fleet. She remained in reserve at Mare Island until 1 June 1966 when her name was struck from the Navy list. The former warship served as a test hulk until 1970. On 24 February 1971, the hulk was sold to the National Metal & Steel Corp., of Terminal Island, California, for scrapping.

== Legacy ==
The base of one of the rotating gun turrets was later surplussed to be used as the rotating mount of a giant Van de Graaf particle accelerator at the physics department of the University of Arizona in Tucson, Arizona. The beam line shot out by the accelerator was steered by rotating the entire accelerator assembly mounted on the turret base. It remained in use until the accelerator was decommissioned around 2005. The fact that a turret base of Tucson was surplussed to be used in Tucson, AZ is apparently a pure coincidence.

== Awards ==
Tucson earned one battle star during World War II.
