= Middle Harbor Shoreline Park =

Public park in Oakland, California

Coordinates: 37°48′21″N 122°19′27″W

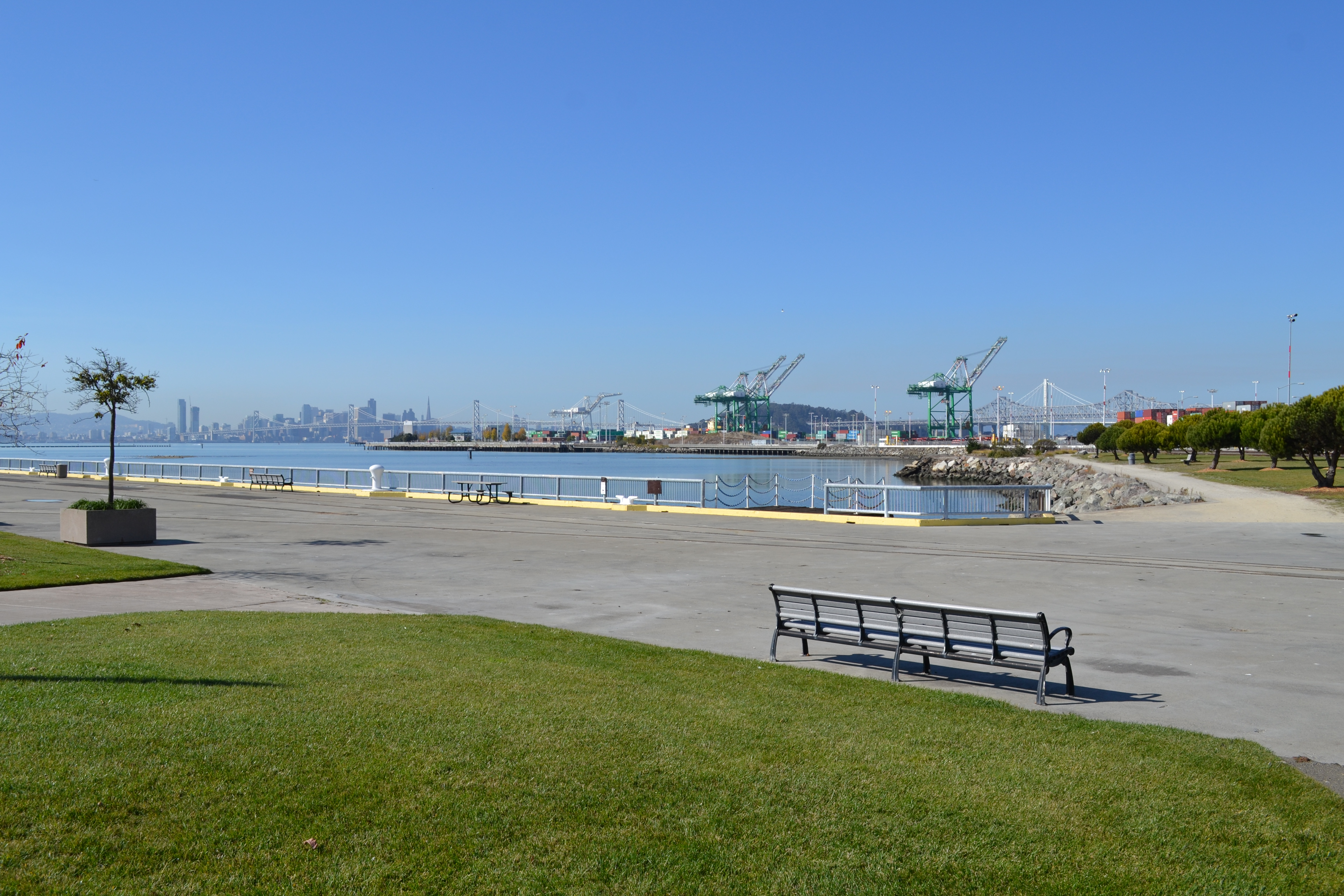
- Middle Harbor Shoreline Park in the Port of Oakland
- Interactive map of Middle Harbor Shoreline Park
- Location: Oakland Bay/Alameda County, California
- Nearest city: Oakland, California
- Area: 38 acres (15 ha)
- Created: 2004
- Operator: Port of Oakland
- Open: Monday - Friday

Middle Harbor Shoreline Park (MHSP) is located on San Francisco Bay and the Oakland Seaport entrance channel, west of downtown Oakland, California. It is owned and operated by the Port of Oakland. The park entrance is at the intersection of 7th Street and Middle Harbor Road. It is open seven days a week from 8 a.m. to dusk.

== History ==
The park is primarily on land that was the former site of the Oakland Naval Supply Depot (1940−1998), which was an important supply base for the Pacific Fleet of the U. S. Navy throughout World War II. The Naval Supply Depot closed in 1998, and the 541 acres (2.19 km^{2}) facility was transferred to the Port of Oakland, which still owns it.

The section adjacent to the Port of Oakland, which includes Port View Park, was originally part of the Oakland Long Wharf or Oakland Pier−Mole, which was the massive western terminus of the Southern Pacific Railroad into San Francisco Bay. The interlocking tower from the railroad's pier has been moved and partially restored as a small commemorative museum. The mast of the USS Oakland is displayed at the entrance of the park.

Additionally, parts of the park used to be the Western Pacific Mole, a former railroad station/ferry pier of the Western Pacific Railroad. Before the WP transferred its operations to the Oakland Long Wharf, passengers could transfer from WP trains to ferries to San Francisco. The Mole was demolished in 1940, and its land is now part of the MHSP.

A 38 acres (0.15 km^{2}) area was redeveloped for the park from 2002 to 2004. Redevelopment of the land included restoration of beaches and creation of a lagoon. The park was opened to the public on September 18, 2004.

Former services at Western Pacific Mole
Preceding station	Western Pacific Railroad	Following station
Terminus	Feather River Route (1910 to 1933)	Oakland toward Salt Lake City

== Features ==
- There is an amphitheater overlooking San Francisco Bay where live entertainment performs.
- The Chappell R. Hayes Memorial Observation Tower, named to honor the West Oakland leader, offers good views of the Oakland Estuary and the Port's shipping activities.
- Interpretive signs throughout the park present the history of the site, the environmental resources here and the adjacent maritime activities.
- A viewing area for observing the super-Panamax cranes in operation at the adjacent Hanjin Terminal.

== Accessibility ==
The following facilities are wheelchair accessible:

- Parking lots
- Restrooms
- Drinking fountains
- Picnic sites
- Port View Park
- Observation Tower
- Viewing area at Western Pacific Mole

== Rules ==
- The park is open from 8:00 a.m. to dusk 7 days a week, all year. It is closed from dusk to dawn, except for special events authorized by Park Use Permit.
- The park will only be closed to the public during special events. Those are conducted no more than 3 times per year, and advance notification is posted.
- Dogs are not allowed within the park, except that Service Dogs ON-LEASH ONLY are permitted on trails and parkland areas (Oakland Municipal Code).

== Gallery ==
Middle Harbor Shoreline Park, with the mast of USS Oakland in the distance.

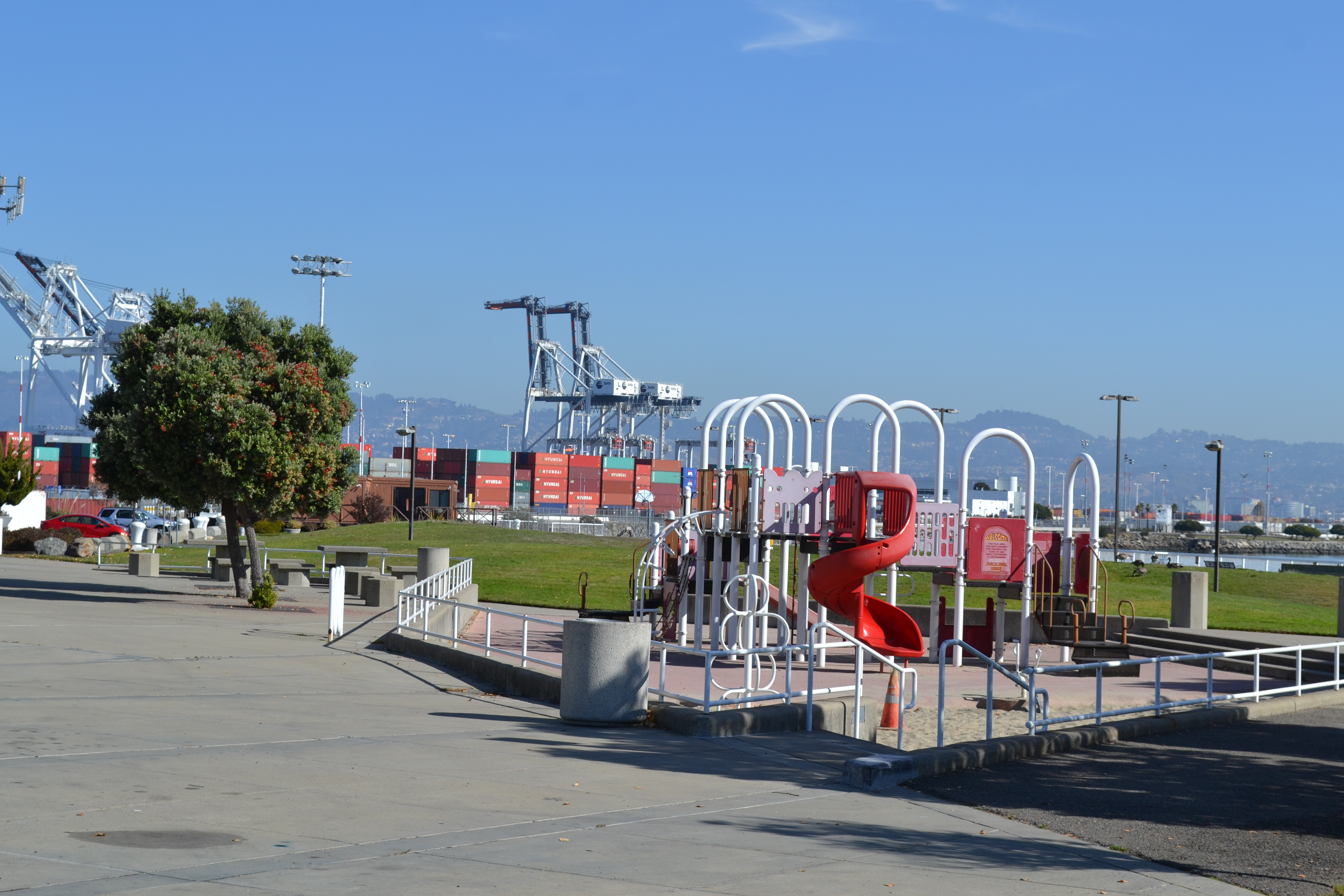
Playground in the park.

Shaded picnic area in the park.

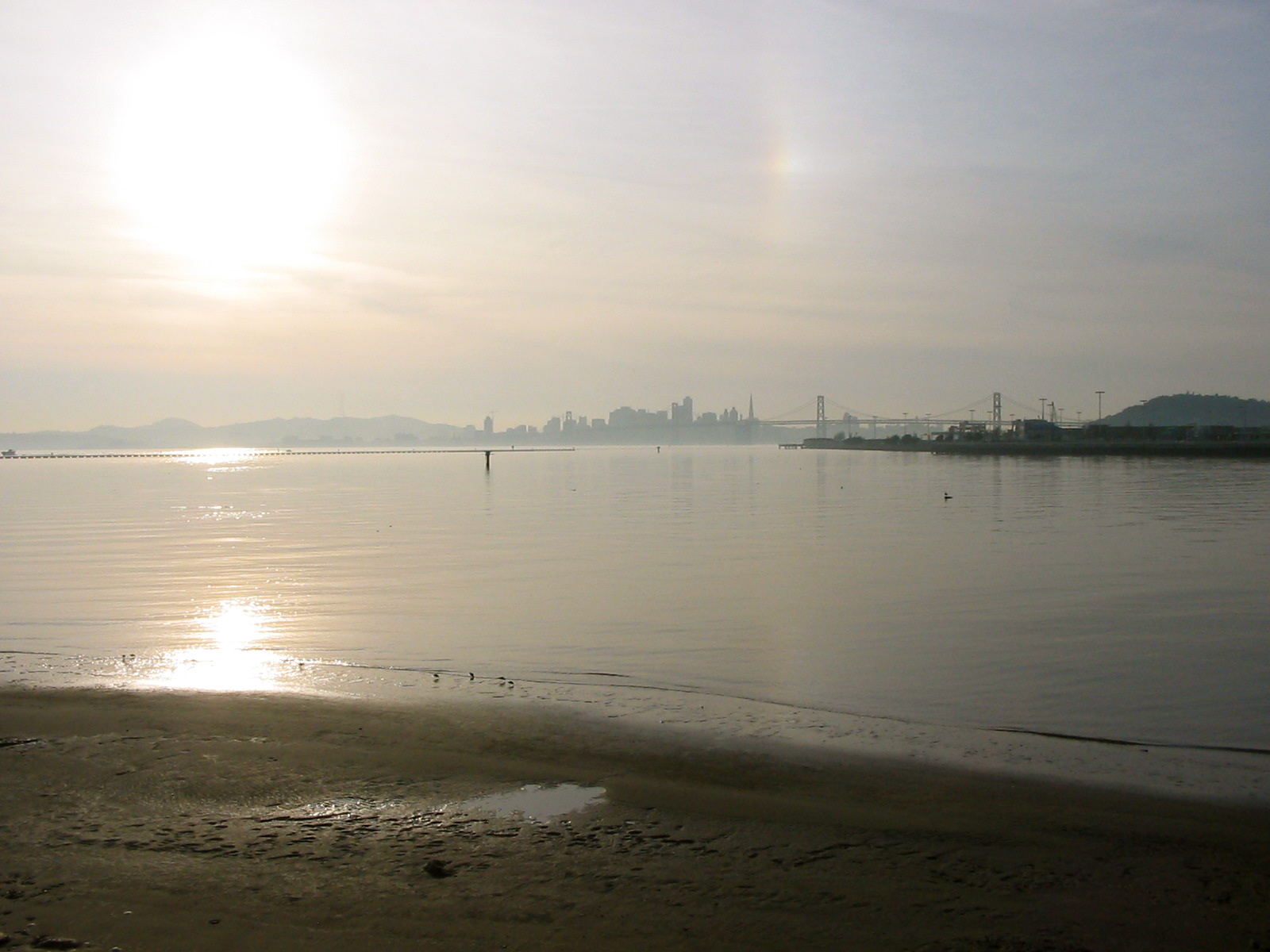
View of beach area and San Francisco from the park.

Gantry cranes at the adjacent Hanjin Terminal, Port of Oakland.
