= USS San Juan (CL-54) =

Atlanta-class light cruiser

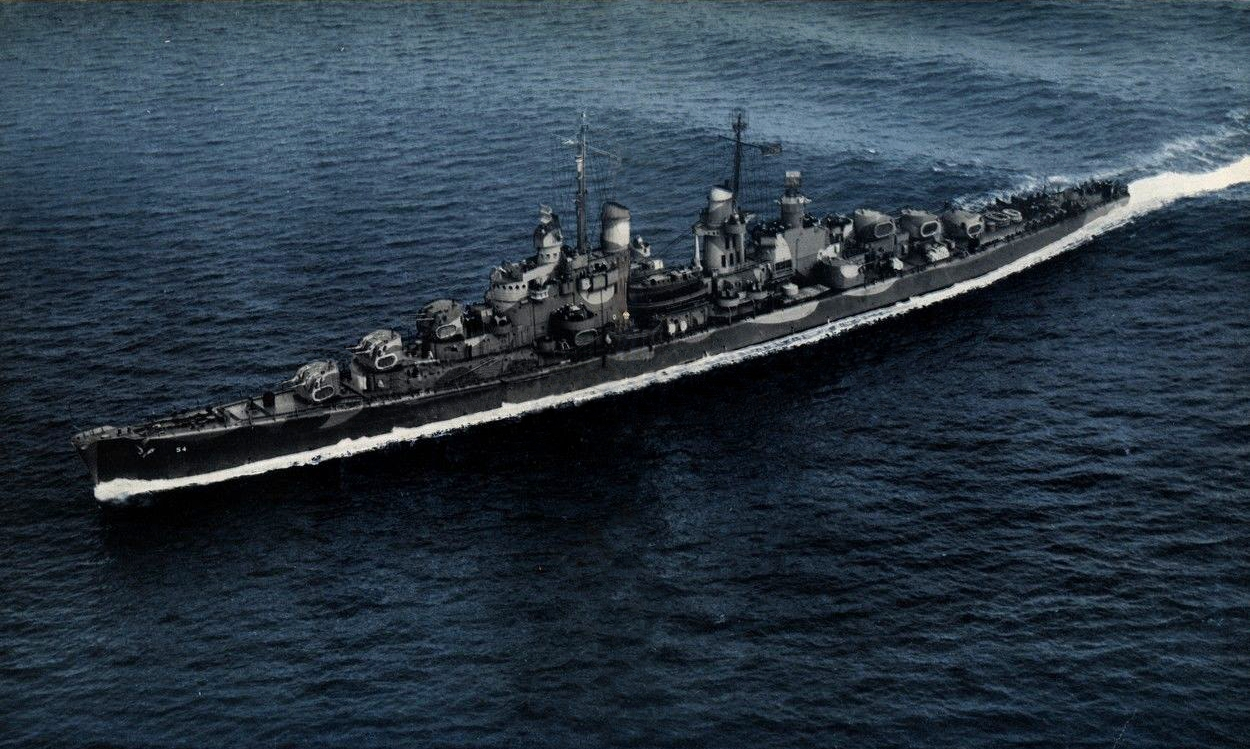
- USS San Juan, 1942

History

United States
- Name: San Juan
- Namesake: The Municipality of San Juan, Puerto Rico
- Builder: Bethlehem Shipbuilding Corporation's Fore River Shipyard, Quincy, Massachusetts
- Laid down: 15 May 1940
- Launched: 6 September 1941
- Sponsored by: Mrs. Margarita Coll de Santori
- Commissioned: 28 February 1942
- Decommissioned: 9 November 1946
- Reclassified: CLAA-54, 28 February 1949
- Stricken: 1 May 1959
- Identification: Hull symbol:CL-54; Hull symbol:CLAA-54; Code letters:NCEL
- Honors and awards: 13 × battle stars
- Fate: Sold for scrapping, 31 October 1961

General characteristics (as built)
- Class & type: Atlanta-class light cruiser
- Displacement: 6,718 long tons (6,826 t) (standard); 8,340 long tons (8,470 t) (max)
- Length: 541 ft 6 in (165.05 m) oa
- Beam: 53 ft (16 m)
- Draft: 20 ft 6 in (6.25 m) (mean); 26 ft 6 in (8.08 m) (max)
- Installed power: 4 × Steam boilers; 75,000 shp (56,000 kW)
- Propulsion: 2 × geared turbines; 2 × screws
- Speed: 32.5 kn (37.4 mph; 60.2 km/h)
- Complement: 820 officers and enlisted
- Armament: 16 × 5 in (127 mm)/38 caliber Mark 12 guns (8×2); 16 × 1.1 in (28 mm)/75 anti-aircraft guns (4×4); 8 × single 20 mm (0.79 in) Oerlikon anti-aircraft cannons; 8 × 21 in (533 mm) torpedo tubes; 6 × depth charge projectors; 2 × depth charge tracks
- Armor: Belt: 1.1–3 3/4 in (28–95 mm); Deck: 1 1/4 in (32 mm); Turrets: 1 1/4 in (32 mm); Conning Tower: 2 1/2 in (64 mm)

General characteristics (1945)
- Armament: 16 × 5 in (127 mm)/38 caliber Mark 12 guns (8×2); 1 × quad 40 mm (1.6 in) Bofors anti-aircraft guns; 5 × twin 40 mm (1.6 in) Bofors anti-aircraft guns; 13 × 20 mm (0.79 in) Oerlikon anti-aircraft cannons; 8 × 21 in (533 mm) torpedo tubes; 6 × depth charge projectors; 2 × depth charge tracks

The second USS San Juan (CL-54), and the first to be named for the city of San Juan, Puerto Rico, was an Atlanta-class light cruiser of the United States Navy. She was laid down on 15 May 1940 by the Bethlehem Steel Co. (Fore River), Quincy, Massachusetts; launched on 6 September 1941; sponsored by Mrs. Margarita Coll de Santori; and commissioned on 28 February 1942.

== Service history ==
=== 1942 ===
After shakedown in the Atlantic, San Juan departed from Hampton Roads, Virginia, on 5 June 1942 as part of a carrier task group formed around the aircraft carrier Wasp (CV-7) and bound for the Pacific. The group got underway from San Diego on 30 June escorting a large group of troop transports destined for the Solomon Islands where the Navy was about to launch the first major American amphibious operation of the war.

Following rehearsal in the Fiji Islands, San Juan provided gunfire support for the landings at Tulagi on 7 August 1942. On the night of 8–9 August, she was patrolling the eastern approaches to the transport area between Tulagi and Guadalcanal, with Admiral Norman Scott embarked, when gun flashes indicated that fighting was taking place in the western approaches. The action turned out to be the Battle of Savo Island, in which an enemy cruiser force sank four Allied cruisers. San Juan retired from the forward area with the empty transports on the 9th and escorted them to Noumea.

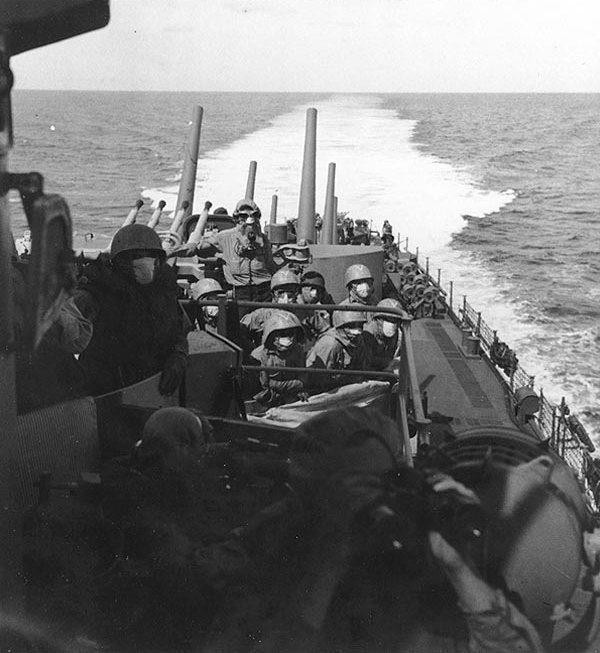
San Juan's crewmen at general quarters, 1942.

She then rejoined Wasp and operated with the carrier force for several weeks between the New Hebrides and the Solomons, on guard against a Japanese carrier attack. However, when this strike materialized on 24 August, San Juan had withdrawn to refuel and thus missed the Battle of the Eastern Solomons. Enterprise was hit in the battle, and San Juan, which had damaged a gun mount off Guadalcanal, escorted the carrier to Pearl Harbor, arriving on 10 September 1942.

On 5 October, the cruiser again headed for the South Pacific, stopping first at Funafuti in the Ellice Islands to deliver a deck load of 20 mm guns to the marines who had just landed there. She then carried out a raid through the Gilberts sinking two Japanese patrol vessels on 16 October. Disembarking Japanese prisoners at Espiritu Santo, the cruiser joined Enterprise on the 23rd. Three days later, after patrol planes had made contact with enemy carrier forces, the Battle of Santa Cruz Islands was fought in which the aircraft carrier Hornet was lost and Enterprise damaged while the Japanese suffered severe losses in aircraft and pilots. During the last dive-bombing attack on the formation, one bomb passed through San Juan's stern, flooding several compartments and damaging, though not disabling, her rudder. She arrived at Nouméa with the task force on 30 October and then spent ten days at Sydney, Australia, receiving permanent repairs. San Juan joined the aircraft carrier Saratoga at Nadi, Viti Levu Island, in the Fijis on 24 November.

=== 1943 ===
From December 1942 to June 1943, San Juan was based at Nouméa and operated in the Coral Sea, both with carrier groups and alone. At the end of June 1943, during the occupation of New Georgia, San Juan's carrier group patrolled the Coral Sea for 26 days to prevent enemy interference. Late in July, the force made a quick stop at Nouméa and moved to the New Hebrides, first to Havannah Harbor, Efate, and later to Espiritu Santo.

On 1 November, the Saratoga group, including San Juan, neutralized airfields on Bougainville and Rabaul while Allied forces landed on Bougainville. In the middle of November, the task group acted as a covering force for the occupation of the Gilberts. San Juan then joined the aircraft carrier Essex on a raid on Kwajalein in the Marshalls, fighting off persistent torpedo plane attacks on 4–5 December. Detached on 6 December, the cruiser returned to the United States for overhaul at Mare Island.

=== 1944 ===
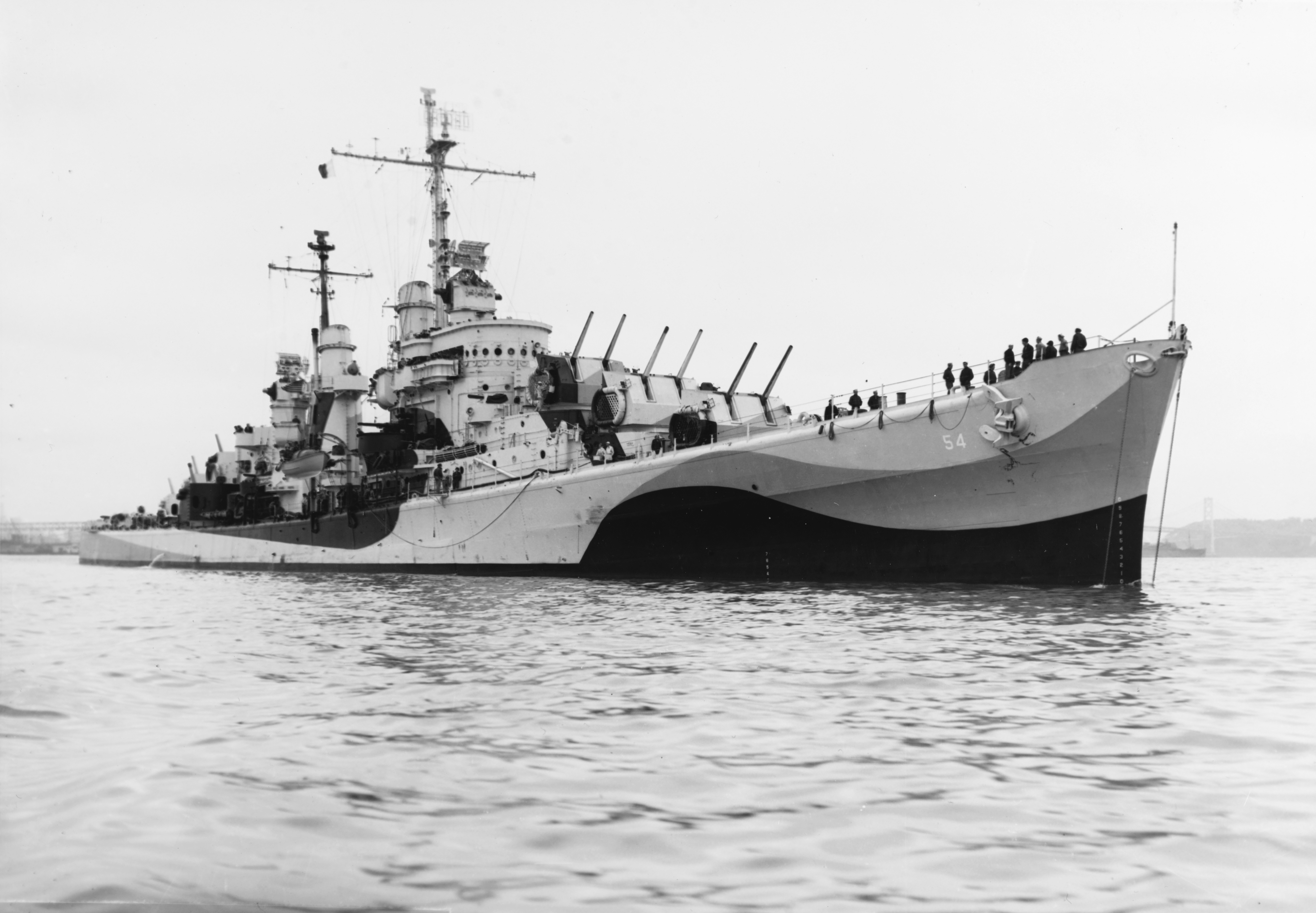
San Juan at San Francisco, on 14 October 1944.

San Juan rejoined Saratoga off Pearl Harbor on 19 January 1944 and the force covered the occupation of Eniwetok in February. San Juan next escorted the carriers Yorktown and Lexington in strikes on Palau, Yap, and Ulithi on 30 March and 1 April. On 7 April, the cruiser joined the new carrier Hornet (CV-12), which covered the landings at Hollandia in April and then struck at Truk on 29–30 April. After returning to bases in the Marshalls, the Hornet group began support of the Marianas campaign in early June, striking at Iwo Jima and Chichi Jima in the Bonins, while American troops landed on Saipan. San Juan helped guard her group during the Battle of the Philippine Sea when American naval air power decisively defeated a Japanese counterattack to save the Marianas, and, in doing so, all but wiped out Japanese naval air strength.

After a short stop at Eniwetok, San Juan escorted the new Wasp (CV-18) and Franklin during July as they covered the capture of Guam with strikes on Iwo Jima and Chichi Jima. After a strike on Palau and Ulithi, San Juan was ordered to San Francisco for overhaul, and departed from Eniwetok on 4 August escorting Yorktown.

Following refresher training at San Diego and Pearl Harbor, San Juan joined Lexington's task group at Ulithi on 21 November. In early December, she screened the carriers in strikes on Formosa and Luzon in support of landings on Mindoro. During this operation, she was sent alone within scouting range of Japanese airfields in an effort to draw out Japanese aircraft by radio deception, but none rose to the bait. On 18–19 December, the force was battered by a typhoon, and returned to Ulithi on Christmas Eve.

=== 1945 ===
Underway again six days later, the carriers covered the occupation of Luzon with strikes on Formosa, Okinawa, and Luzon from 3–9 January 1945, and then from 10–20 January raided ports and shipping in the South China Sea, particularly Saigon, Cam Ranh Bay, and Hong Kong. After replenishing at Ulithi, San Juan escorted Hornet in air strikes on Tokyo during the Iwo Jima operation in February and then returned to Ulithi on 1 March to prepare for the Okinawa invasion.

San Juan rejoined Hornet on 22 March and, until 30 April, operated with her to the north and east of Nansei Shoto, interrupting her regular occupation of supporting air strikes and replenishment at sea with a bombardment, on 21 April, of Minami Daito Shima, a small island about 180 mi (290 km) from Okinawa. Planes from San Juan's group helped sink the giant Yamato on 7 April. After nine days at Ulithi, the Hornet group was back on station off Nansei Shoto for strikes on targets in Japan. San Juan arrived in Leyte Gulf on 13 June for repairs and then joined Bennington, on 1 July for more strikes on the Japanese home islands. She was at sea when the news of the Japanese capitulation was received on 15 August, and, on the 27th, after 59 days at sea, she joined the van forces for the triumphal entry of the 3rd Fleet into Sagami Wan, just outside Tokyo Bay.

San Juan's embarked unit commander, Commodore Rodger W. Simpson, was assigned responsibility for freeing, caring for, and evacuating Allied prisoners of war in Japan. On 29 August, the ship entered Tokyo Bay and landed parties which liberated prisoners at camps at Omori and Ofuna and the Shanagawa hospital. The former prisoners were transferred to hospital ships Benevolence and Rescue. After evacuating camps in the Tokyo Bay area, San Juan moved to the Nagoya-Hamamatsu area to the south and then to the Sendai-Kamanishi area to the north. On completing her liberation duty, the cruiser moored on 23 September next to the last Japanese battleship, Nagato, at Yokosuka shifting to an outer anchorage there on 28 October. She sailed for the United States on 14 November, disembarked Commodore Simpson at Pearl Harbor, and continued to the US with homeward bound troops, arriving on 29 November. Three days later, she sailed on "Magic Carpet" duty to Nouméa and Tutuila, returning to San Pedro, California, on 9 January 1946 with a full load of troops.

== Decommissioning and sale ==
The cruiser arrived at Bremerton, Washington, for inactivation on 24 January 1946, and was decommissioned and placed in reserve there on 9 November 1946. San Juan was redesignated CLAA-54 on 28 February 1949. She was struck from the Navy list on 1 March 1959 and sold on 31 October 1961 to National Metal and Steel Corporation, Terminal Island, Los Angeles, California, for scrapping.

== Awards ==
San Juan received 13 battle stars for her World War II service.
