= Port of Oakland =

Port authority in California, US

- Port of Oakland logo, since 2024.

Agency overview
- Formed: 1927
- Type: Port authority
- Jurisdiction: Oakland, California
- Annual budget: US$409 million (operating revenue, 2023)
- Website: www.portofoakland.com

The Port of Oakland is the port authority for the city of Oakland, California, United States. Its primary responsibilities are the operation of the Oakland Seaport and Oakland San Francisco Bay Airport. It also operates a commercial real estate business as the owner of Jack London Square, Airport Business Park, and more than 875 acres (354 ha) of waterfront property. It operates a municipal electric utility that serves port-owned properties.

As an independent city department, the port authority is led by seven port commissioners who are nominated by the mayor of Oakland and appointed by the Oakland City Council. It is self-funded, with an annual operating revenue of $409 million as of 2023.

== History ==
Port of Oakland logo until 2024

The Board of Port Commissioners was organized in 1927 to operate the Oakland Seaport and newly built Oakland Municipal Airport.

== See also ==
- Middle Harbor Shoreline Park
- Oakland Ballpark
