= Lykes =

Lykes may refer to:

Surname:

- Brinton Lykes (born 1949), American psychologist
- Chris Lykes (born 1998), American professional basketball player

Businesses:

- Lykes Brothers, private company founded in Florida in 1910
- Lykes Brothers Steamship Company, cargo shipping company during the 20th century
- Lykes Meat Group sells meat products such as ham, ground pork, pork chops, bacon, lunch meat
- Lykes Coastwise Line, Inc., passenger and cargo shipping line founded in 1943 in California, United States

Infrastructure:

- Lykes Palmdale Airport (FAA LID: FL73) is a small private airport in Glades County, Florida, United States
- Lykes Building, skyscraper located in downtown Tampa, Florida, United States

Ships:

- SS Almeria Lykes (1920)
- MV Almeria Lykes (1972)
- SS Almeria Lykes (1940)
- SS Doctor Lykes
- SS Jean Lykes
- SS Louise Lykes
- SS Louise Lykes (1941)
- SS Nancy Lykes
- SS Tillie Lykes (1972)
