= SS Green Harbour =

Type C9-class cargo ship

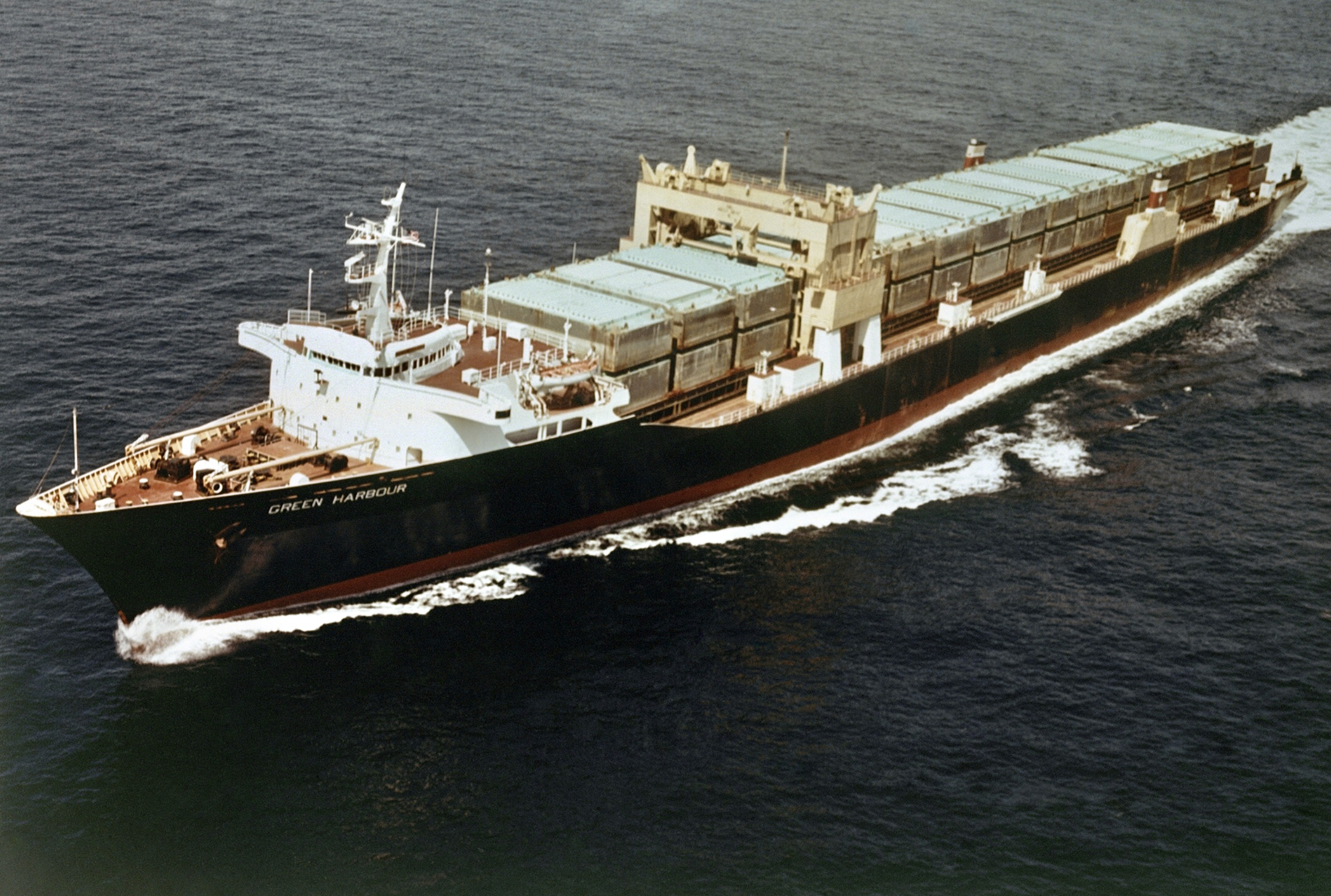
- USNS Green Harbour

History

United States
- Name: Green Harbour
- Namesake: Green Harbour
- Owner: Central Gulf Lines (1974-1992); Military Sealift Command (1992-2001); Central Gulf Lines (2001-2002)
- Builder: Avondale Shipyard
- Laid down: 1974
- Launched: 1974
- In service: 1974
- Out of service: 2002
- Homeport: Diego Garcia
- Identification: IMO number: 7390698; Hull number: T-AK-2064
- Fate: Scrapped, 2002

General characteristics
- Class & type: Type C9-class cargo ship; (C9-S-81f)
- Displacement: 28,500 t (28,050 long tons), standard; 49,152 t (48,376 long tons), full
- Length: 893 ft 3 in (272.26 m)
- Beam: 100 ft 0 in (30.48 m)
- Draft: 40 ft 0 in (12.19 m)
- Installed power: 1 × shaft; 1,100 psi (7,600 kPa); 32,000 shp (24,000 kW)
- Propulsion: 2 × Combustion Engineering boilers; 2 × De Val turbines
- Speed: 16 knots (30 km/h; 18 mph)
- Complement: 24 mariners

SS Green Harbour was a Type C9-class ship built in 1974, operated by the Military Sealift Command during Gulf War.

== Construction and commissioning ==
Green Harbour was laid down and launched in 1974 at Avondale Shipyard, New Orleans, Louisiana. Put into service later that same year by the Maritime Administration for operation by Central Gulf Lines.

In 1991, the ship was chartered by the Military Sealift Command (MSC) and commissioned into the Maritime Prepositioning Ship Squadron 2, Diego Garcia, as Green Harbour (T-AK-2064). She took part in the Operation Desert Shield.

She was returned to the Central Gulf Lines after the contact with MSC was finished in 2001. The ship was sold for scrap in 2002.
