= SS Cape Farewell =

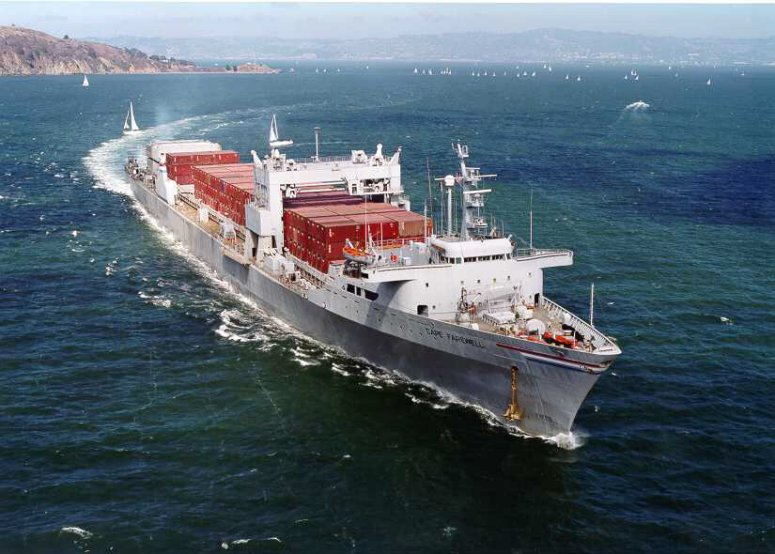
- SS Cape Farewell (AK-5073)

History

United States
- Name: SS Cape Farewell (AK-5073)
- Builder: Avondale Industries Corp., New Orleans, LA
- Laid down: 1973
- Homeport: Beaumont, Texas
- Identification: IMO number: 7304792; MMSI number: 366059000; Callsign: KICF
- Fate: Sold for scrap
- Status: Arrived for scrapping at Brownsville, Texas on 15 June 2023
- Notes: Launched as SS Delta Mar

General characteristics
- Class & type: Lighter Aboard Ship (LASH) Barge Carrier
- Displacement: 57,150 tons
- Length: 894 ft 0 in (272.49 m)
- Beam: 100 ft 0 in (30.48 m)
- Draft: 38 ft 0 in (11.58 m)
- Propulsion: steam turbine, single propeller
- Speed: 18.7 kn (21.5 mph; 34.6 km/h)
- Capacity: 89 barges
- Complement: Full Operational Status: 31 civilian mariners
- Armament: None
- Aviation facilities: None

SS Cape Farewell (AK-5073) was laid down in 1973, as SS Delta Mar, a Maritime Administration type (C9-S-81d) hull under Maritime Administration contract (MA 259) at Avondale Industries Corp., New Orleans, LA. She launched and delivered to the Maritime Administration for operation by Delta Line. She was renamed SS American Mar and reacquired by the Maritime Administration for assignment to the Ready Reserve Fleet (RRF), 2 April 1987. She was assigned to the Beaumont Reserve Fleet as part of the Maritime Administration Ready Reserve Fleet. When activated Cape Farewell was assigned to Military Sealift Command (MSC) was one of four LASH Ready Reserve Force Ships. Cape Farewell arrived for scrapping in Brownsville on 15 June 2023.

== See also ==
- SS Cape Flattery (AK-5070) sister ship
