= SS Cape Florida =

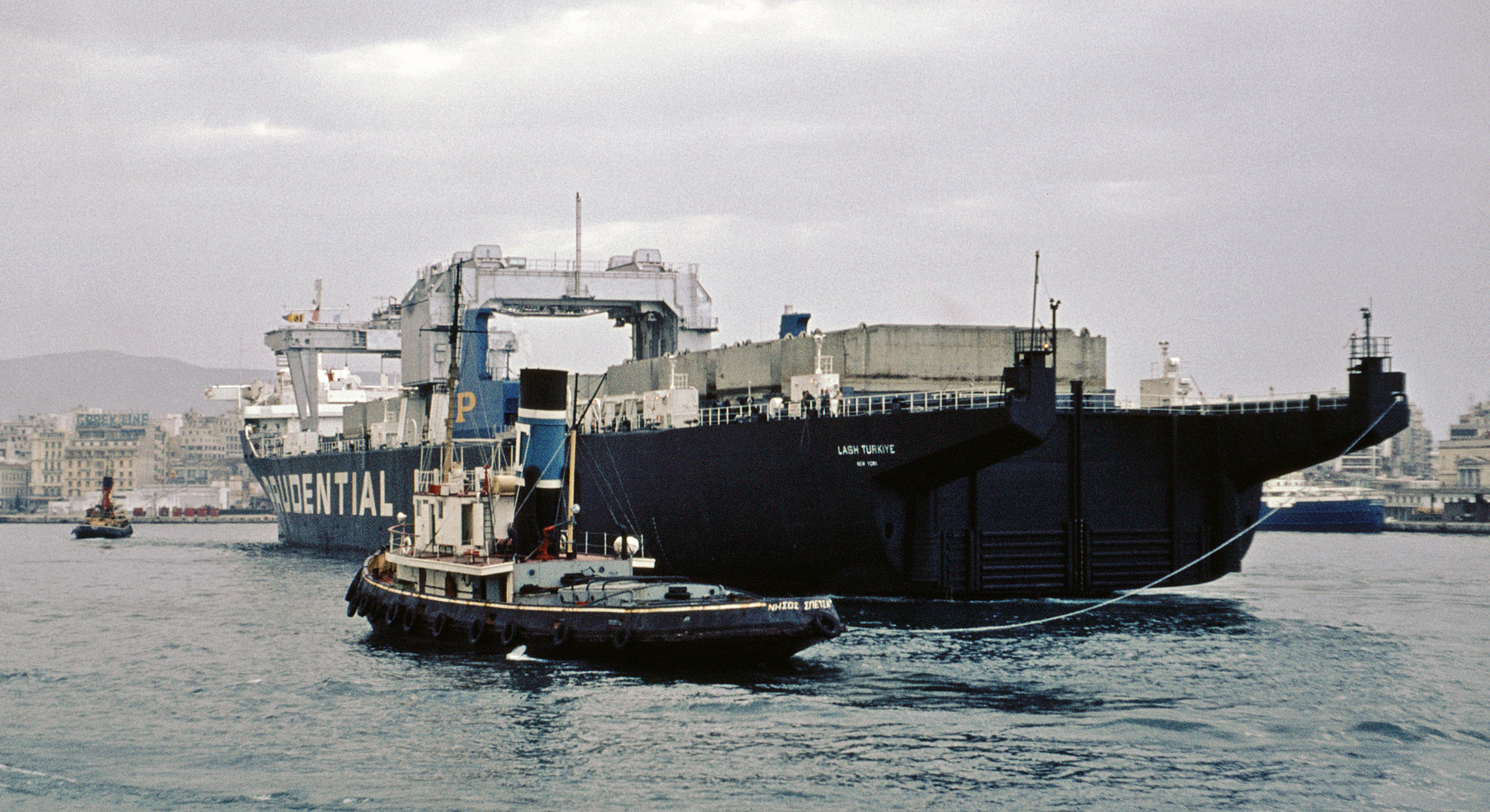
- LASH Turkiye seen in 1971

History

United States
- Name: SS Cape Florida (AK-5071)
- Builder: Avondale Industries Corp., New Orleans, LA
- Laid down: 29 December 1969
- Launched: 10 October 1970
- Acquired: 17 February 1987
- Out of service: 28 July 2006
- Identification: IMO number: 7034335; MMSI number: 366057000; Callsign: WMIG
- Fate: Scrapped at Brownsville, TX beginning 13 August 2020
- Notes: Launched as SS LASH Turkiye

General characteristics
- Class & type: Lighter Aboard Ship (LASH) Barge Carrier - C8-S-81b
- Displacement: 44,610 tons
- Length: 893 ft 0 in (272.19 m)
- Beam: 100 ft 0 in (30.48 m)
- Draft: 38 ft 0 in (11.58 m)
- Propulsion: Steam turbine, single propeller
- Speed: 18.7 kn (21.5 mph; 34.6 km/h)
- Capacity: 77 barges
- Complement: Full Operational Status: 31 civilian mariners
- Armament: None
- Aviation facilities: None

SS Cape Florida (AK-5071) was laid down 29 December 1969, as SS LASH Turkiye, a United States Maritime Administration type (C8-S-81b) hull under Maritime Administration contract (MA 229) at Avondale Industries Corp., New Orleans. She was launched, 10 October 1970 and delivered to the Maritime Administration, 12 September 1973, for operation by Prudential Grace Line. She was acquired by Delta Line and initially renamed SS Delta Caribe and subsequently SS American Caribe. She was reacquired by the Maritime Administration for assignment to the Ready Reserve Fleet (RRF) on 17 February 1987 where she was berthed at Beaumont, Texas. When activated Cape Florida was assigned to the Military Sealift Command (MSC) as one of the Military Sealift Command's four LASH Ready Reserve Force Ships and could be activated in 10 days. She was removed from MSC control, withdrawn from the RRF by reassignment to the National Defense Reserve Fleet, 28 July 2006. On 6 July 2020, the contract for dismantling Cape Florida was awarded to International Shipbreaking Ltd. She arrived at Brownsville, Texas on 13 August of the same year to begin scrapping, with the process expected to be completed by early 2021.
