= SS Cape Flattery =

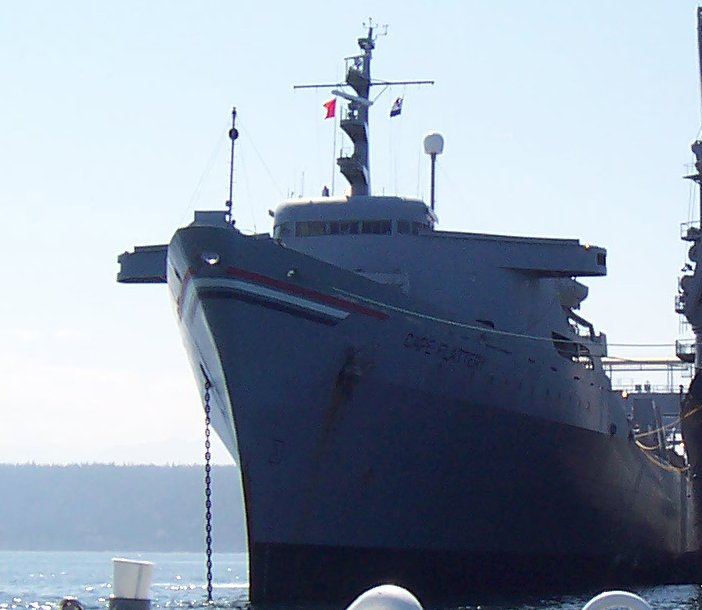
- SS Cape Flattery (AK-5070)

History

United States
- Name: SS Cape Flattery (AK-5070)
- Builder: Avondale Industries Corp., New Orleans, LA
- Laid down: 10 February 1972
- Launched: 19 May 1973
- Acquired: 14 May 1987
- Home port: Beaumont, TX
- Identification: IMO number: 7320411; MMSI number: 366058000; Callsign: KIIA
- Status: In ready reserve since 1987. Ten days needed to activate.
- Notes: Launched as SS Delta Norte

General characteristics
- Class & type: Lighter Aboard Ship (LASH) Barge Carrier
- Displacement: 57,150 tons
- Length: 894 ft 0 in (272.49 m)
- Beam: 100 ft 0 in (30.48 m)
- Draft: 39 ft 0 in (11.89 m)
- Propulsion: steam turbine, single propeller
- Speed: 18.7 kn (21.5 mph; 34.6 km/h)
- Capacity: 89 barges
- Complement: Full Operational Status: 31 civilian mariners
- Armament: None
- Aviation facilities: None

SS Cape Flattery (AK-5070) was laid down on 10 February 1972, as SS Delta Norte a Maritime Administration type (C9-S-81d) hull under Maritime Administration contract (MA 259) at Avondale Industries Corp., New Orleans, LA. She was launched, 19 May 1973 and delivered to the Maritime Administration, 12 September 1973, for operation by Delta Line. She was reacquired by the Maritime Administration for assignment to the ready reserve fleet (RRF), 14 May 1987 and berthed at Beaumont, TX as part of the Maritime Administration Ready Reserve Fleet. When activated Cape Flattery is assigned to Military Sealift Command (MSC) as one of the Military Sealift Command's four LASH Ready Reserve Force Ships. Cape Flattery can be activated in 10 days

== See also ==
- SS Cape Farewell (AK-5073) sister ship
