= Palmdale Airport =

Palmdale Airport may refer to:

- Plant 42 or LA/Palmdale Regional Airport, in Palmdale, California, United States (FAA: PMD)
- Lykes Palmdale Airport, in Palmdale, Florida, United States (FAA: FL73)
