= Yulius Fuchik =

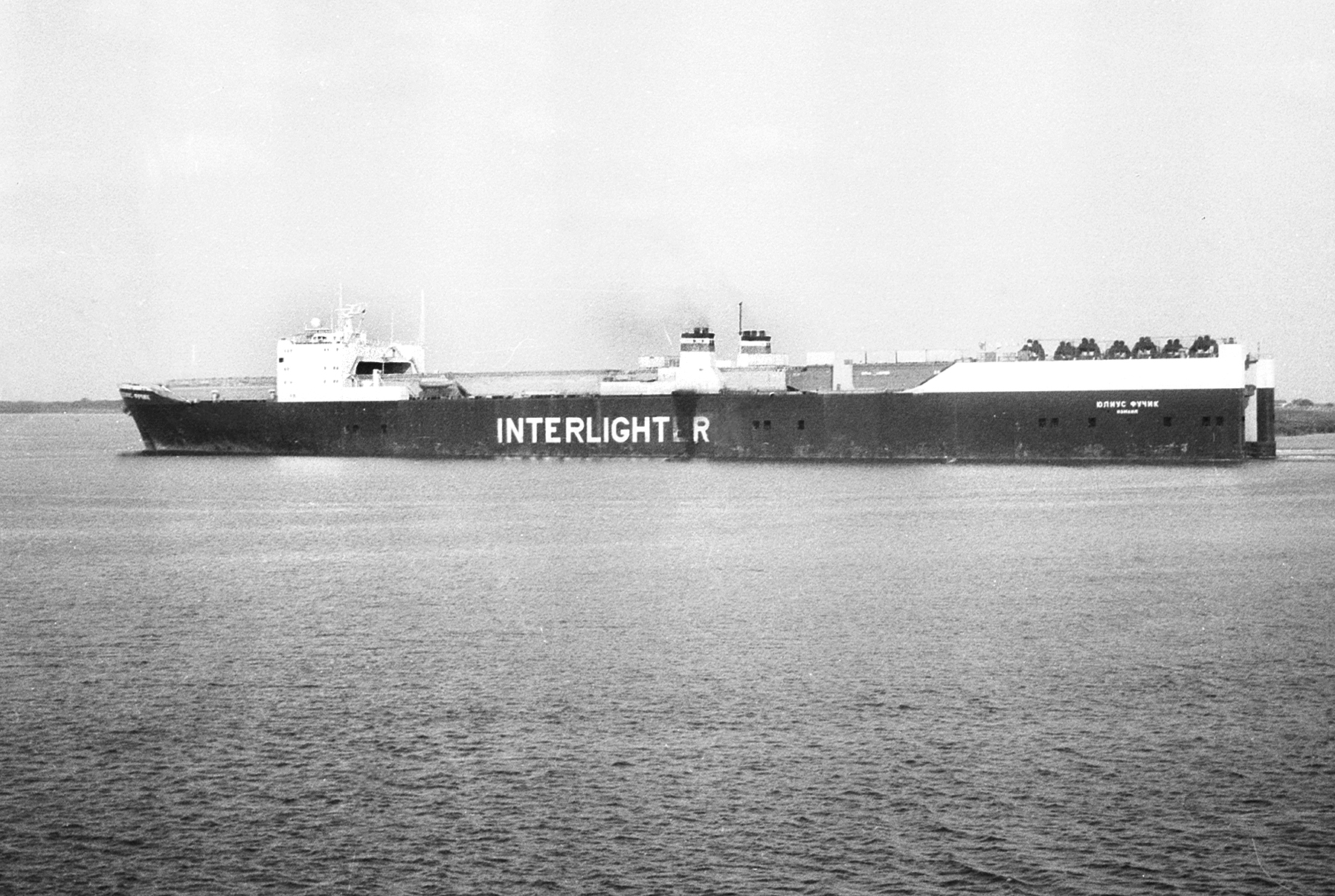
- Yulius Fuchik leaving Ust-Dunaysk, Ukraine, for an unidentified Asian port on 9 September 1992.

History

Soviet Union
- Name: Yulius Fuchik (Юлиус Фучик) (Note: Although the name of the ship is sometimes transliterated as Julius Fucik, such as in the Tom Clancy novel, in official context she is referred to as Yulius Fuchik, transliterated using English orthographic transcription based on the Russian spelling.)
- Namesake: Julius Fučík
- Operator: Interlighter
- Port of registry: Izmail, Soviet Union
- Builder: Valmet Vuosaari shipyard (Helsinki, Finland)
- Cost: FIM 350 million
- Yard number: 290
- Launched: 3 March 1978
- Completed: 20 October 1978
- In service: 1978–1991
- Fate: Transferred to Ukraine, 1991

Ukraine
- Name: Yulius Fuchik (Юлиус Фучик)
- Operator: Interlighter
- Port of registry: Izmail, Ukraine
- In service: 1991–1998
- Fate: Transferred to Cyprus, 1998

Cyprus
- Name: Production Driller
- Port of registry: Limassol, Cyprus
- In service: 1998-2002
- Fate: Transferred to Panama, 2002

Panama
- Name: Asian Alliance
- Port of registry: Panama City, Panama
- In service: 2002–2003
- Fate: Transferred to Mongolia, 2003

Mongolia
- Name: Alliance
- Port of registry: Ulaanbaatar, Mongolia
- In service: 2003
- Identification: IMO number: 7505322
- Fate: Broken up in Alang in 2003

General characteristics
- Type: Barge carrier
- Tonnage: 35,817 GRT; 15,497 NRT; 37,850 DWT
- Displacement: 60,262 tons
- Length: 266.4 m (874 ft)
- Beam: 35.0 m (114.8 ft)
- Height: 50.5 m (166 ft) from keel to mast
- Draft: 11.0 m (36.1 ft)
- Depth: 23.0 m (75.5 ft)
- Decks: Three cargo decks
- Deck clearance: 6.1 m (20 ft)
- Ramps: 2,600-ton lifting platform in the stern
- Installed power: 4 × Wärtsilä-Pielstick 16PC2-5V400 (4 × 6,620 kW)
- Propulsion: Two KaMeWa controllable pitch propellers
- Speed: 20.5 knots (38.0 km/h; 23.6 mph) (ballast); 19 knots (35 km/h; 22 mph) (service)
- Range: 12,000 nautical miles (22,000 km; 14,000 mi)
- Capacity: 26 1,300-ton lighters; 56 LASH barges; 1,552 TEU
- Crew: 50–55

Yulius Fuchik (Russian: Юлиус Фучик) was a Soviet and later Ukrainian barge carrier. Derivatives of the Seabee system, she and her sister ship, Tibor Szamueli, were built in the late 1970s by the Finnish state-owned shipbuilder Valmet in Vuosaari shipyard. As the demand for lighter transport fell in the 1990s, she was sold and eventually broken up in Alang in 2003.

== History ==
=== Development and construction ===
In the 1970s, the Soviet authorities issued a request for tenders for the construction of a vessel capable of carrying 25 to 30 barges with displacement of 1,300 tons. At that time, the Soviet Union had the most extensive inland waterway system in the world and the Rhine–Main–Danube Canal connecting the North Sea to the Black Sea was expected to open in the near future. Together with the increasing oil prices, the development of efficient barge-carrying systems with high loading and unloading rate generated considerable interest in the Soviet Union.

The contract for two ships was awarded to the Finnish state-owned shipbuilding company Valmet and was, at the time, the largest single contract made by a Finnish industrial company at FIM 700 million (US$200 million). Although Valmet had been developing its own barge handling system, it was agreed that the proven American Seabee concept would be adopted instead of the shipyard's own design due to the relatively short timescale before delivery. The Soviets purchased two sets of drawings from the American owners for US$1 million. However, a number of changes were made to the original design, and as a result the design costs accounted for some 25 percent of the man-hours spent on the project. The work included extensive model testing, which resulted in the adoption of a bulbous bow that alone increased the ships' service speed by 0.5 knots.

Yulius Fuchik, named after the Czech journalist and resistance fighter Julius Fučík, was launched on 3 March 1978 and handed to V/O Sudoimport, the Soviet foreign trade organization with a monopoly for the foreign trade of ships, on 20 October of the same year. At the time of her delivery, she was the most expensive ship ever constructed by a Finnish shipyard. The second ship, Tibor Szamueli — named after a Hungarian Communist leader — followed in 1979. The ships were later followed by two smaller feeder-type barge carriers, Boris Polevoy and Pavel Antokolskiy, in the 1980s.

=== Career ===
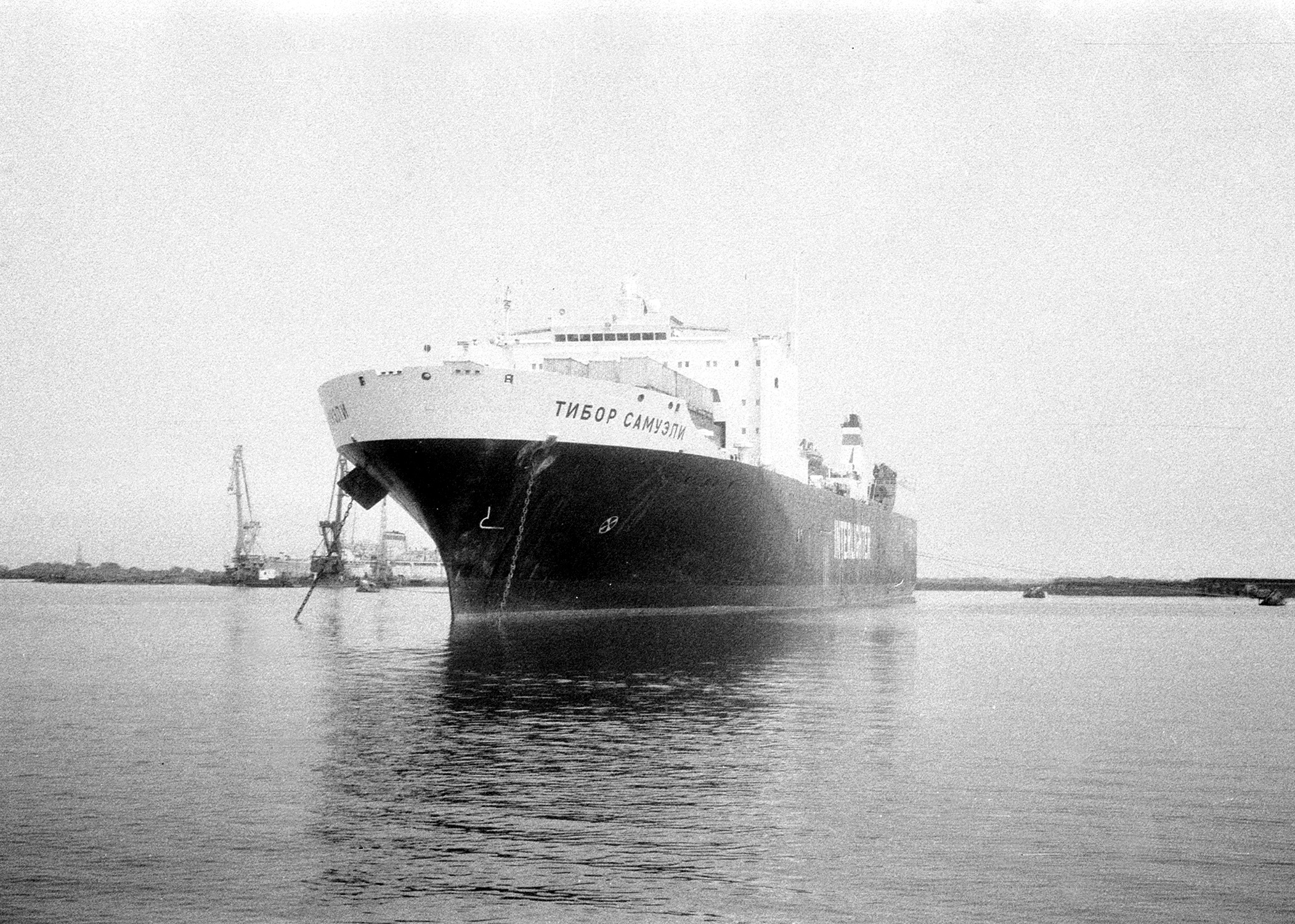
Tibor Szamueli, the sister ship of Yulius Fuchik, moored at Ust-Dunaysk, Ukraine, on 25 August 1992.

Yulius Fuchik and her sister ship were operated by Interlighter, a company founded in May 1978 by the governments of Bulgaria, Hungary, Soviet Union and Czechoslovakia with the sole purpose of transporting lighters without transshipment between the countries along the Danube river and the countries in South and South-East Asia. The transportation service was offered under the brand "Danube-Sea Line". The barges carried by Yulius Fuchik were loaded in various ports along the Danube river and then pushed downstream to Sulina, Romania, where they were loaded in the ship. They were mainly transported to the Mekong Delta, a voyage that took around 18 days, and pushed upstream as far as Phnom Penh, Cambodia, for unloading. Occasionally, lighters were also carried to Karachi, Pakistan; Bombay, India; and Penang, Malaysia. The service continued until the early 1990s, when the demand for lighters dropped and the ships were laid up.

The subsequent career of the Finnish-built barge carriers is unclear. Both Yulius Fuchik and Tibor Szamueli were sold in the late 1990s and renamed Production Driller and Development Driller respectively. Despite the names, it is uncertain if the ships were ever converted or otherwise used for offshore drilling. After the alleged plans for using the barge carriers to transport rolling stock from the United States to the Latin America fell through, the ships were laid up in Piraeus, Greece.

The ships changed hands again in 2002. Production Driller was renamed Asian Alliance and Development Driller became Asian Reliance. It is unknown if the specialized barge carriers, already close to the end of their economic life, were used for transporting cargo. Both ships were sold for scrap in 2003 "as is" in Eleusis, Greece. Asian Alliance was renamed Alliance and broken up in Alang, India, while Asian Reliance was rechristened Reliance and then C Reliance, and scrapped on Gadani Beach, Pakistan.

== Design ==
=== General characteristics ===
Yulius Fuchik was 226.4 metres (743 ft) long overall and 210.3 metres (690 ft) between perpendiculars. She had a beam of 35.0 metres (114.8 ft) and her depth to the upper deck was 23.0 metres (75.5 ft). From keel to mast, she measured 50.5 metres (166 ft). The draft of the ship when loaded to the summer load line was 11 metres (36 ft), corresponding to displacement of 60,262 tons. Her gross register tonnage was 35,817 register tons, net register tonnage 15,497 register tons and deadweight tonnage 37,850 tons. In terms of the main dimensions, Yulius Fuchik was slightly wider than the older Seabee ships, but otherwise her main dimensions were nearly identical to the original design.

The general arrangements of Yulius Fuchik were largely dictated by the cargo handling system. The superstructure, spanning across the weather deck, housed only part of the ship's accommodation space. The entire crew of 50 was housed in single cabins, most of them located within the narrow side compartments on both sides of the cargo decks. In addition to normal messes and saloons, the amenities of the ship also included sports and hobby rooms, library, sauna, photographic laboratory and even a swimming pool.

=== Cargo capacity ===
Yulius Fuchik belonged to the distinct group of cargo ships known as barge carriers which offered, at the time, the highest theoretical loading and unloading rate of all cargo ships. The lighter aboard ship (LASH) system was based on unpowered barges, also known as lighters, that were loaded on board a larger vessel for transport between inland waterways separated by open seas. For this purpose, Yulius Fuchik had vast cargo decks and a large lifting platform in the stern.

Although the basic design of the ship was based on existing Seabee ships with a capacity of 38 1,000-ton lighters, Yulius Fuchik was designed for 26 slightly different "Danube-Sea barges" weighing 1,300 tons each. Both the lower deck and the 'tweendeck could accommodate eight 38-metre (125 ft) barges, two side by side, while the longer weather deck had enough space for ten barges, each capable of carrying 1,070 tons of cargo. The barges were moved longitudinally in the cargo holds on remote-controlled platforms. Although the bottom deck, located 0.8 metres (2.6 ft) below the waterline at maximum draught, was protected by a watertight stern door, flooding it while the ship was underway would not have compromised the stability of the vessel.

The most striking feature of the ship was the lifting platform in the stern, abaft from the propellers and rudders, which was supported by high cantilever structures on both sides. Although the arrangement was similar to the original Seabee design, the "Syncrolift" cargo elevator was electric instead of hydraulic. Eight winches in four pairs were capable of hoisting 2,600 tons of cargo at a speed of 0.7 metres per minute (2.3 feet per minute), giving the ship a calculated loading capacity of about 2,600 tons per hour in optimum conditions.

In addition to the purpose-built barges, Yulius Fuchik could also carry other types of cargo. Although each barge could be loaded with 15 standard 20-foot shipping containers, they could also be carried on the cargo decks and even moved around with the barge-handling equipment. Using special container adapters on the cargo rails, Yulius Fuchik could carry 1,312 loaded containers plus an additional 240 empty containers on the upper deck stacks, bringing the total container capacity to 1,552 TEU. In addition, 54 LASH-type barges (the type used by the nuclear-powered Sevmorput) could be carried with another set of adapters, and the decks were strengthened for ro-ro cargo with axle loads up to 22 tons. Furthermore, the ship carried two 440 kW (590 hp) pusher tugs for handling the barges.

=== Power and propulsion ===
Yulius Fuchik was powered by four 16-cylinder Wärtsilä-Pielstick 16PC2-5V400 medium-speed diesel engines located amidships, each producing 6,620 kW (8,880 hp) at 504 rpm. The engines were coupled via double input/single output reduction gearboxes to two 5.5-metre (18 ft) KaMeWa controllable pitch propellers turning at 135 rpm. The propeller shafts were of considerable length, and thus had to be supported by six bearings. The propulsion system gave the ship a maximum speed of 20.5 knots (38.0 km/h; 23.6 mph), but her typical service speed was slightly less, 19 knots (35 km/h; 22 mph). Underway, the ship burned heavy fuel oil at a rate of 128 tons per day. The propulsion system of Yulius Fuchik was the largest deviation from the original Seabee design which utilized a single 36,000 shaft horsepower (27,000 kW) steam turbine coupled to a fixed pitch propeller instead of the twin shaft diesel power plant.

For maneuvering at ports, Yulius Fuchik was also equipped with a 900 kW bow thruster. Onboard electricity was produced by four six-cylinder medium-speed Valmet-B&W 6S28 diesel alternators, each generating 1,250 kVA.

== In popular culture ==
Yulius Fuchik played a prominent role in the 1986 techno-thriller Red Storm Rising by Tom Clancy and Larry Bond. In the novel, she was disguised as the American-flagged Seabee carrier Doctor Lykes and used to transport Soviet troops to Keflavik, Iceland. In order to conform with the slightly different silhouette of the Lykes Lines ship, parts of her superstructure were removed and the shape of the funnels was altered with prefabricated parts. Furthermore, the twenty-foot Interlighter markings on the side of the ship were painted over and replaced with "Lykes Lines," and the white L on a blue diamond of the Lykes Brothers Steamship Company emblem was added on the forward superstructure.

Later in the book, Yulius Fuchik was spotted by an American P-3C Orion shortly after launching four Lebed class hovercraft from her cargo deck. After an SA-7 surface-to-air missile launched from the ship failed to hit the Orion, the American plane retaliated with a Harpoon anti-ship missile and called in two F-15s to strafe the ship with their 20 mm cannons. The damaged Yulius Fuchik eventually reached the port of Keflavik and, after running aground during the approach, slowly settled to the bottom next to the quay in water only a few feet deeper than the draught of the vessel.
