= SS Cape Mendocino =

US naval ship

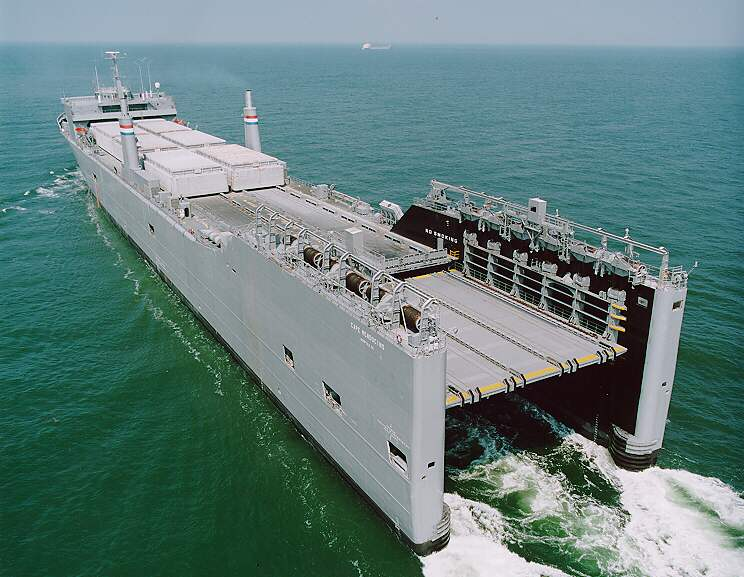
- SS Cape Mendocino (T-AKR-5064) - Doctor Lykes

History

United States
- Name: SS Doctor Lykes
- Owner: United States Maritime Administration
- Builder: General Dynamics Quincy Shipbuilding Division, Quincy, Massachusetts
- Laid down: 15 July 1970
- Launched: 10 October 1971
- Acquired: 21 June 1972
- Renamed: SS Cape Mendocino in 1986
- Identification: IMO number: 7117292; MMSI number: 368550000; Callsign: KHNB

General characteristics
- Class & type: Heavy Lift Barge Carrier
- Displacement: 18,900 tons empty, 55,660 full
- Length: 876 ft
- Beam: 106 ft
- Draft: 40 ft
- Propulsion: two steam turbines, two shafts
- Speed: 16.2 kts.
- Range: not disclosed
- Capacity: 24 barges, 19 CAFS
- Complement: 34 when operational, 9 while in reserve
- Time to activate: 5 days
- Armament: none
- Aviation facilities: Capable of landing a helicopter but not basing one

SS Cape Mendocino (T-AKR-5064) is a steam turbine powered heavy-lift Seabee barge carrier, one of three ships of her type in the Military Sealift Command's Ready Reserve Force.

She was originally built as the Maritime Administration type (C8-S-82a) hull SS Doctor Lykes, under a MARAD contract (for commercial use with the Lykes Brothers Steamship Company. She was laid down on 15 July 1970, at the General Dynamics Quincy Shipbuilding Division, MA, launched on 10 October 1971, and delivered for service on 21 June 1972.

Cape Mendocino is used in various tasks for the US military in heavy transport of goods in various theaters of action. In October 2011 she was moved from the James River Reserve Fleet to the Beaumont Reserve Fleet.

== See also ==
- SS Cape Mohican (T-AKR-5065) sister ship
