= SS Cape Mohican =

A number of ships have been named Cape Mohican, including:

- SS Cape Mohican (1942)
- SS Cape Mohican (T-AKR-5065)
