= Chanomi Creek =

Body of water in Delta State, Nigeria

Coordinates: 5°24′N 5°27′E

Chanomi Creek is a body of water in the Niger Delta in Delta State, Nigeria.

== Incidents in and near Chanomi Creek ==
On July 12, 2006, a group of boats, escorted by Nigerian troops, were assaulted by militants in twenty speedboats. Four Nigerian naval soldiers were killed, and several Chevron workers were taken captive; they were released July 14.

Also in 2006, oil pipelines in the area were vandalized by people described as "militant youths" by Funsho Kupolokun, Group managing director of the Nigerian National Petroleum Corporation (NNPC). The NNPC announced it would repair the targeted pipelines.

On January 20, 2007, six Filipinos and one Nigerian who were traveling on a boat (operated by the German company Baco Liner) in Chanomi Creek were kidnapped while on their way to Warri. The group the kidnappers belonged to has yet to be identified. The Nigerian government has engaged in talks with the Movement for the Emancipation of the Niger Delta (MEND) who holds the hostages, and government spokesman Sheddy Ozoene said that the six Filipinos "are in good health."

== Pollutions ==
Report says that the chanomi creek is polluted by sawdust, artisanal oil and fishing activities, open defecation, sewage pipes, oil pollution, and other organic pollutants.
