= Lighter aboard ship =

Loading barges on a bigger ship for transport

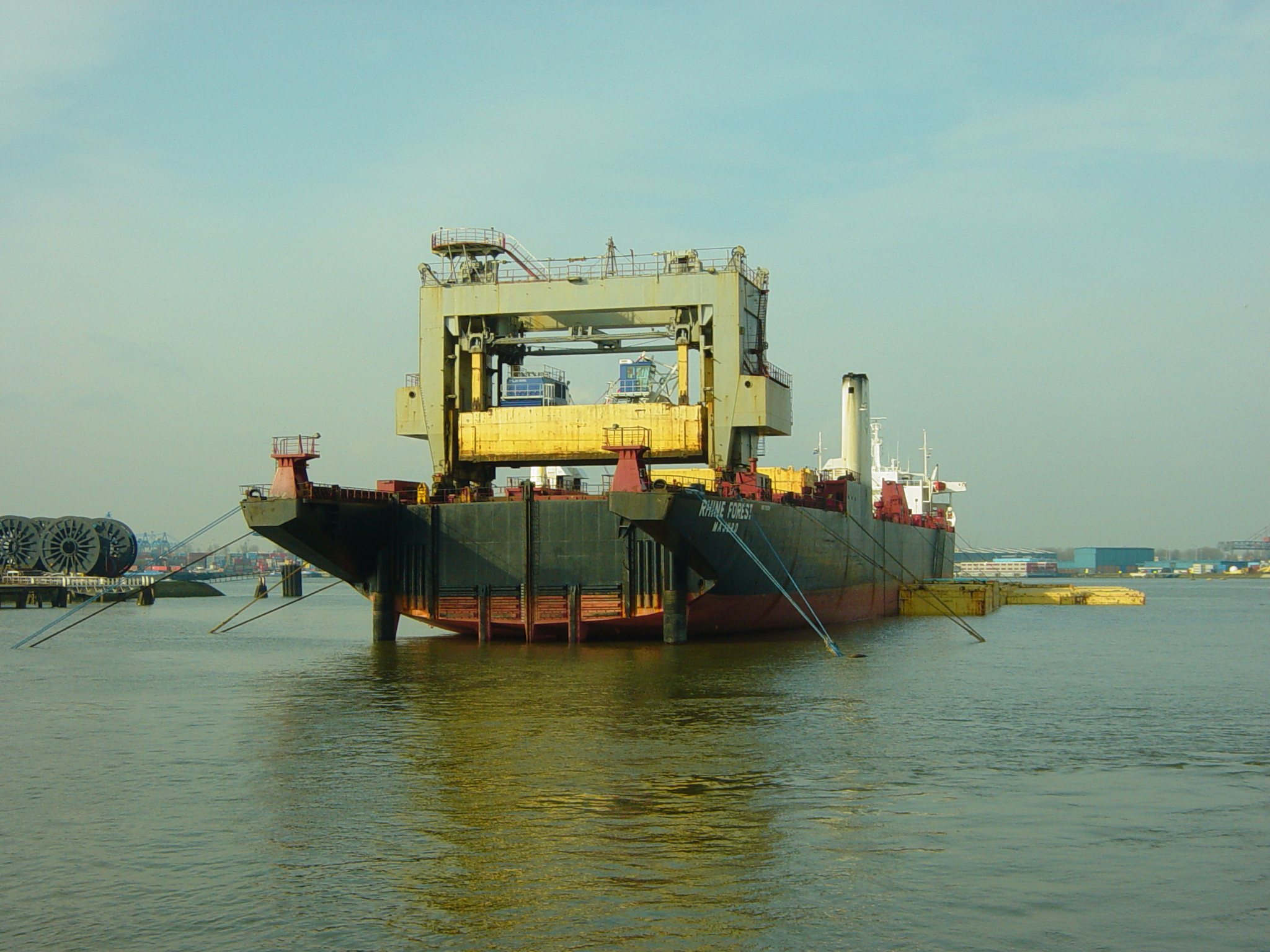
MV Rhine Forest in the Port of Rotterdam

The lighter aboard ship (LASH) system refers to the practice of loading lighters (a type of barge) aboard a bigger vessel for transport. It was developed in response to a need to transport lighters, which are usually unpowered, between inland waterways separated by open seas. Lighters are typically towed or pushed around harbors, canals or rivers and cannot be relocated under their own power. The carrier ships are known variously as LASH carriers, barge carriers, kangaroo ships or lighter transport ships.

== History ==
=== Development ===
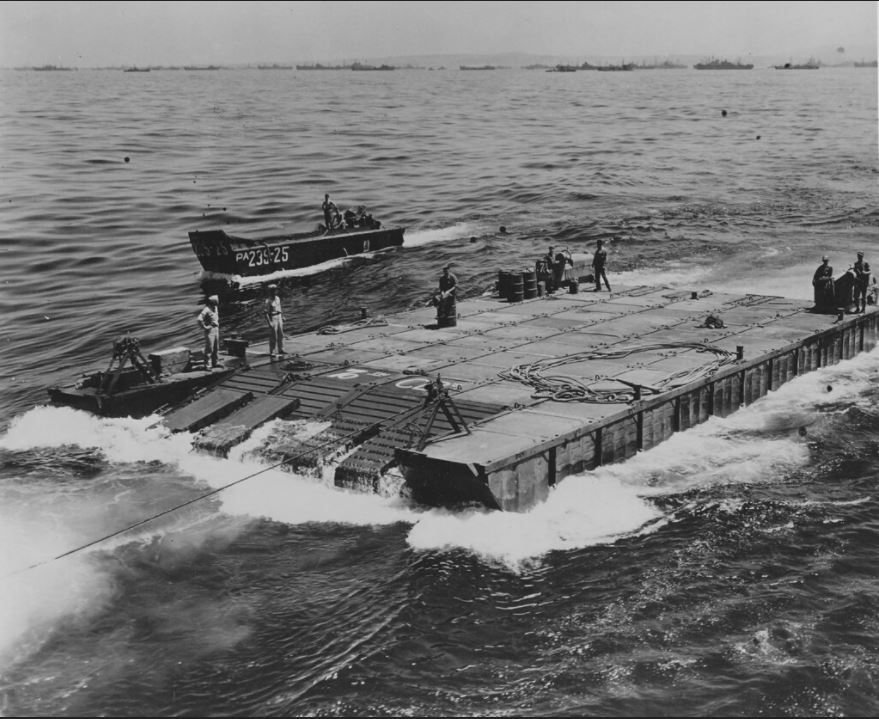
70th Naval Construction Battalion Seabees operating a 6 x 20 barge, May 1945

During World War II, the United States Seabees developed a pontoon assembly for moving cargo from transports to assault beachheads. This approach was the forerunner to the LASH system. By the 1950s, the needs of cargo transport customers were no longer being met by the break bulk system of loading individual cargo pieces into a ship's hold. The dimensions and shapes of cargo pieces varied widely, and the ISO standard cargo container had only slowly begun to be adopted during the 1960s. Large container terminals with extensive conveyor systems and storage areas were still only in the planning or development stages at the time.

The LASH system was developed as an alternative and supplement to the developing container system. The lighters, which may be characterized as floating cargo containers, served dual purposes: transportation over water, and the establishment of a modular, standardized shape for loading and unloading cargo. The lighters are loaded onto a LASH carrier at the port of embarkation and unloaded from the ship at the port of destination. Each lighter was approximately 60 ft × 30 ft × 15 ft (18.3 m × 9.1 m × 4.6 m) (L×W×H), with a capacity of 385 t (379 long tons; 424 short tons) and 550 m^{3} (19,000 cu ft); the dry (unladen) weight of each steel lighter was 3.9 t (4.3 short tons).

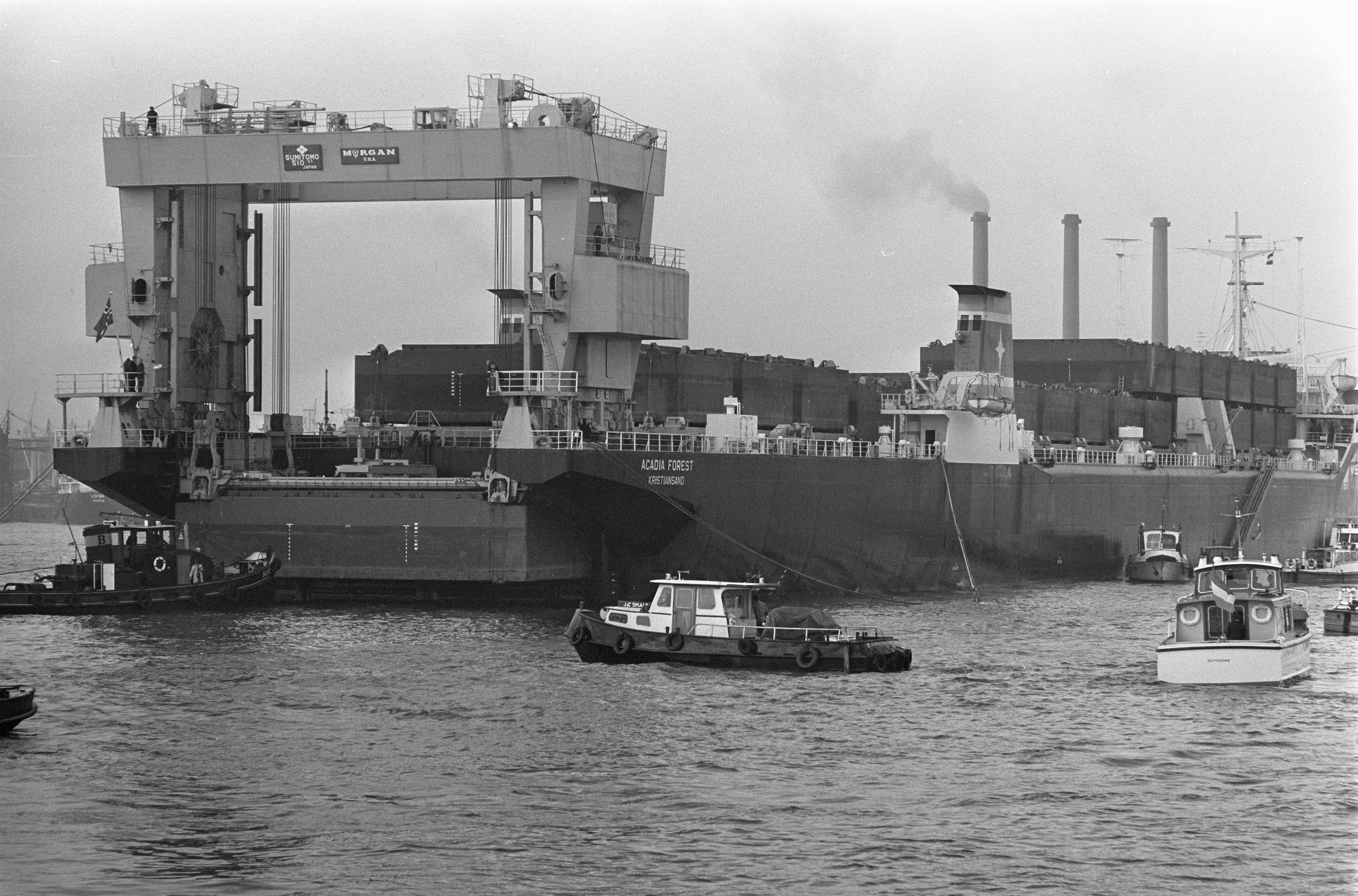
Stern of Acadia Forest, photographed in Rotterdam, showing one of the lighters on the gantry crane, positioned fully aft.

The system was developed during the 1960s by the American shipbuilding engineer Jerome Goldman. Acadia Forest, commissioned in September 1969, was the first LASH carrier - the ship could take up 75 standardized lighters, with about 376 metric tons of total loading capacity. At the time, it was a novel kind of ship, the first vessel designed primarily to transport other, smaller ships.

In the late 1980s, the Soviet Union built Sevmorput, a nuclear-powered LASH carrier. Sevmorput is one of only four nuclear powered cargo vessels ever built, and is the largest and the only one in an active commercial service, as it mainly operates in the Russian domestic waters along the Northern Sea Route, where it's unencumbered by the unwillingness of ports to accommodate nuclear ships, a problem that made other nuclear cargo vessels impractical.

=== Economic impact ===
At the time of its invention, the system was considered by experts to be a considerable advancement in shipping technology. LASH carriers were able to transport five times more cargo than a comparable conventional transport ship, the loading and unloading process was much more efficient, and a lack of harbor equipment or quay moorings provided no obstacle since the lighters could be loaded directly onto the ship. The system also relieved the pressure to unload as quickly as possible, since the lighters already in the water could be moved while others were being unloaded. All told, these ships spent more than 80% of their annual application time at sea, whereas conventional ships often lay at harbor for as much as half the year.

=== Problems and shortcomings ===
New problems which were as yet unknown to shipping companies arose with the advent of the LASH system and similar barge carriers. Aboard the carrier ship, the lighter is simply a large cargo container, but in the seaport and on the inland waterways it becomes a vessel. As a vessel, they are subject to requirements for equipment regulations like anchors. Also, serving waterways which freeze over in winter required a high capital expenditure.

Studies showed that the costs of addressing these issues, along with the costs of operating the carrier ships and their lighters, were much higher than for the customary freighter ships or the ISO-compliant container ships that were beginning to conquer the transportation market. While barge carriers and lighters are a technologically interesting sea transport system, they are economic only under certain specific conditions of traffic and economy.

In the United States, LASH operators were subject to Jones Act tariffs on the value of repairs made to ships engaged in coastwise trade. LASH operators were thus required to pay a tariff on repairs to their cargo-carrying equipment (barges), unlike container ship operators, who could send their intermodal containers aboard for low-cost repairs. To mitigate this competitive disadvantage, Congress exempted LASH vessels from the tariff.

=== Preservation ===
On 15 December 2007, Rhine Forest, ex-Bilderdijk of the Holland-Amerika Line, entered the Port of Rotterdam for the last time, prior to being withdrawn from service because of low utilization on the New Orleans/Rotterdam route. It is a sister ship of MS München. The LASH lighter with registration p. CG 6013 was donated to De Binnenvaart, an inland-shipping museum in Dordrecht, where it is now part of an exhibit.

== Designs ==
=== LASH ===
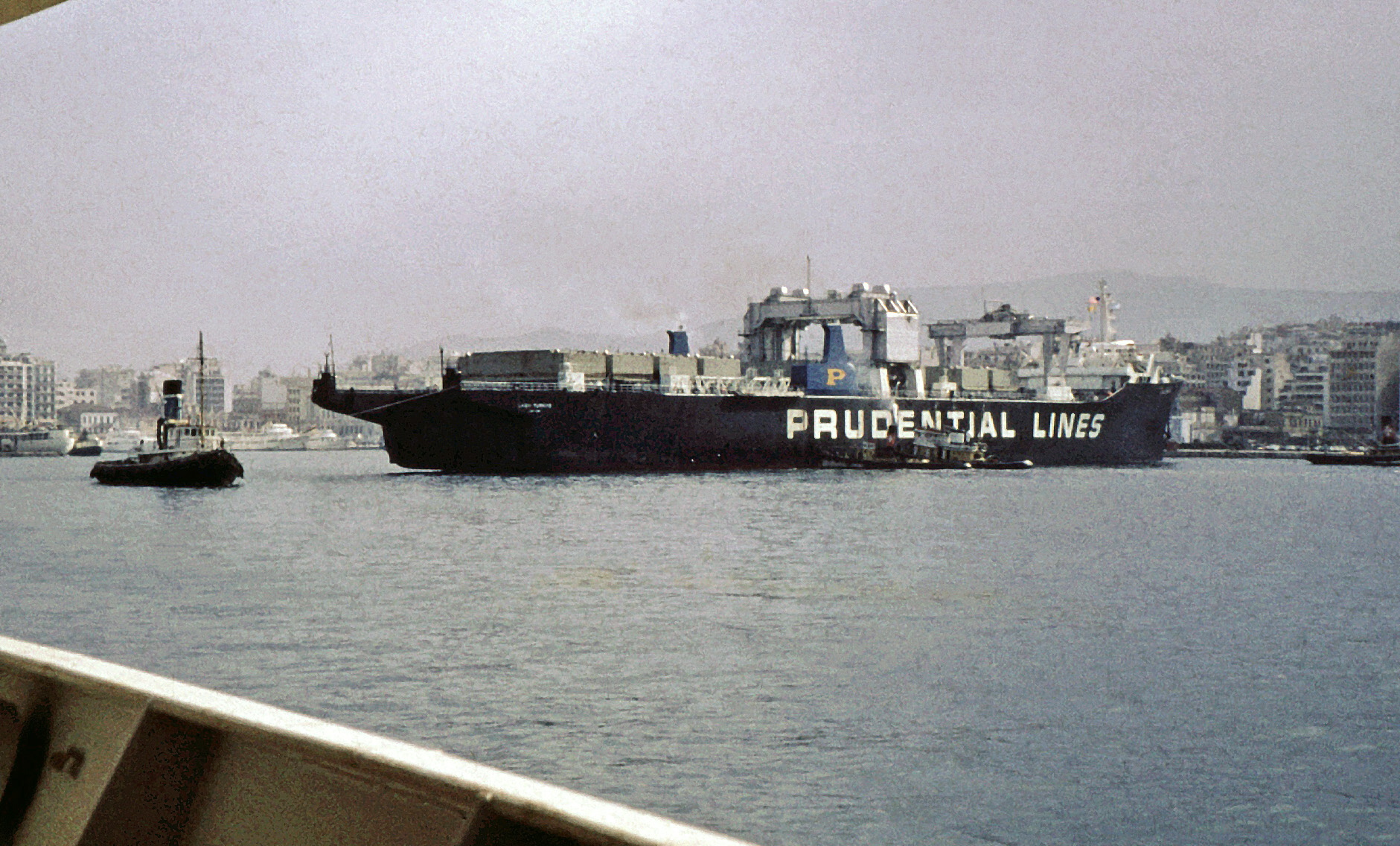
Lash Turkiye 1971 in Piraeus

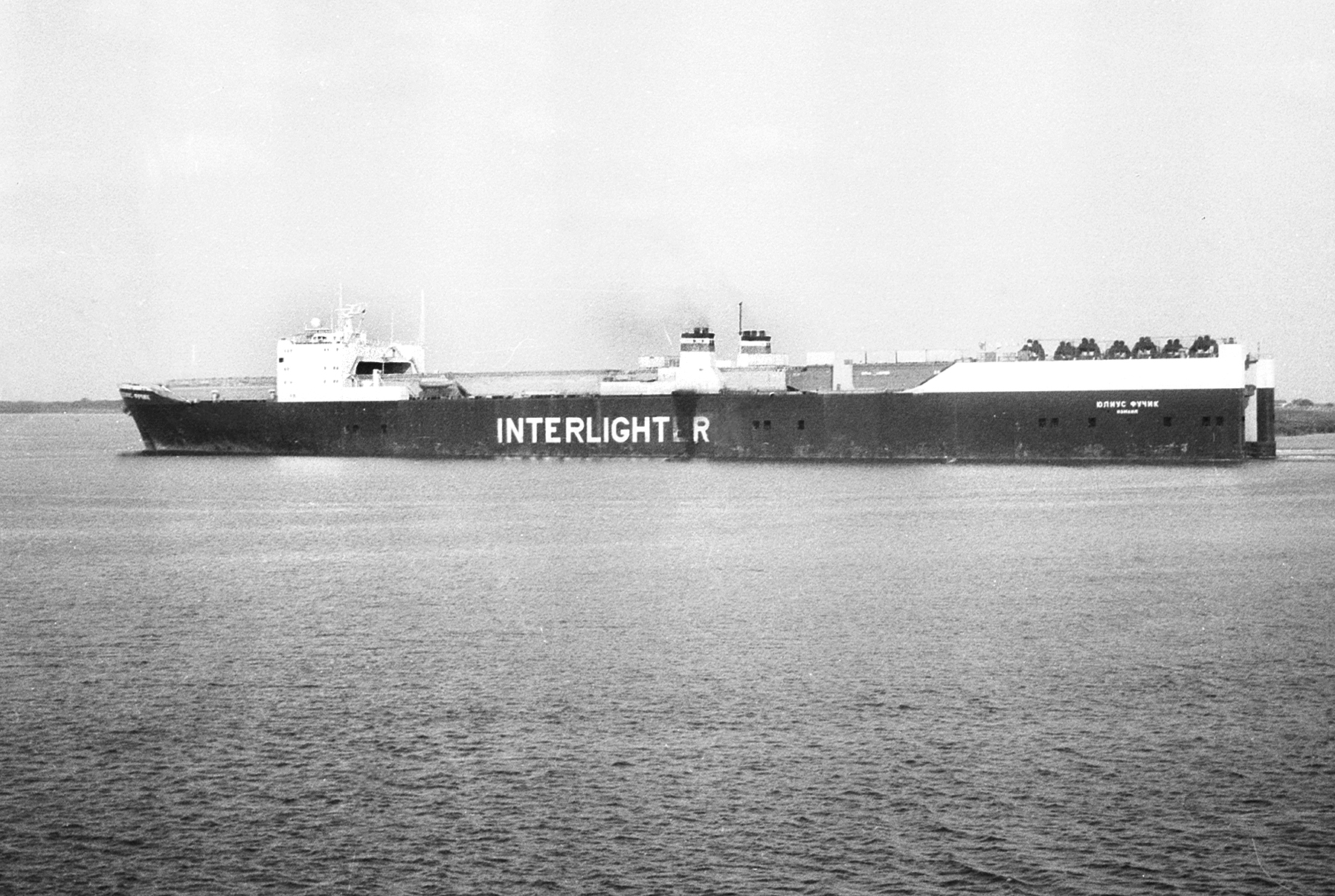
Yulius Fuchik, a Soviet and later Ukrainian barge carrier based on the Sea Bee system.

LASH barges are loaded at inland river and shallow ports. Then, the barges are towed to ocean port's fleeting areas to meet the LASH mother vessel. On arrival, the mother vessel crane lifts the LASH barges onto the ships. LASH cargo does not require transshipment, as the movement from the origin to destination takes place with a single bill of lading.

An important technical problem raised by the invention of the new transport system was the shape of the lighters. Several other designs, differentiated mainly by the shape of the lighters and the loading mechanism, were proposed, but the LASH system found the largest range of applications. In this approach, the lighters were individually lifted onto the carrier ship by a large gantry crane located at the stern of the ship. The crane could move the entire length of the ship and stack the lighters atop each other in the ship's body and on the deck. The cranes had a load-carrying capacity of more than 500 Mp. Loading or unloading a lighter took on average fifteen minutes. LASH ships were constructed in Europe, Japan and the US with almost uniform parameters.

The host vessel is sometimes purpose-built or modified with a door at the waterline, to allow the payloads to be loaded and unloaded without special lifting equipment. An example would be SS Cape Florida (AK-5071) (originally LASH Turkiye), built at Avondale Shipyard for the American shipping line Prudential Grace, and later transferred to the Ready Reserve Fleet.

==== Technical data ====
LASH Carrier
Parameter	LASH 1	LASH 2
Overall length	262 m 860 ft	250 m 820 ft
Beam	32.50 m 106.6 ft	30.50 m 100.1 ft
Draught	11.30 m 37.1 ft	10.70 m 35.1 ft
Tonnage	43,000 t 47,000 short tons	29,600 t 32,600 short tons
Speed	19 kn 35 km/h; 22 mph	22 kn 41 km/h; 25 mph
Power	26,000 hp 19,000 kW	32,000 hp 24,000 kW

LASH Lighter
Parameter	
Length	18.70 m 61.4 ft
Beam	9.50 m 31.2 ft
Headway	4.00 m 13.12 ft
Weight	80.00 t 88.18 short tons
Capacity	380.00 t 418.88 short tons
Draught	2.60 m 8 ft 6 in

=== Sea Bee system ===
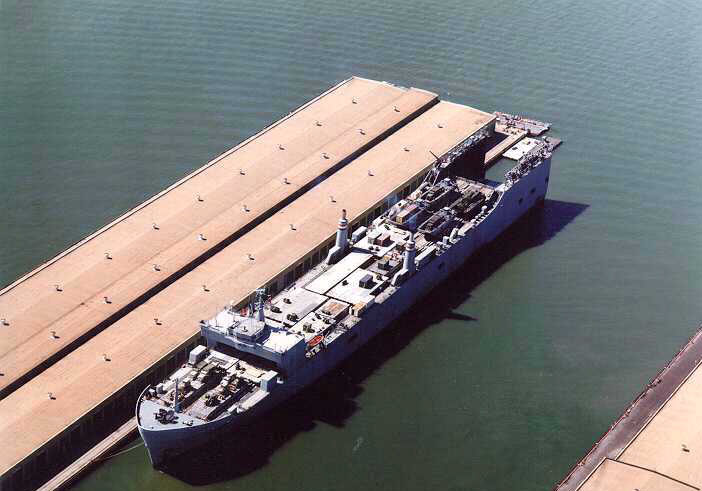
SS Cape Mohican (T-AKR-5065) built as the SS Tillie Lykes a type C8-S-82a

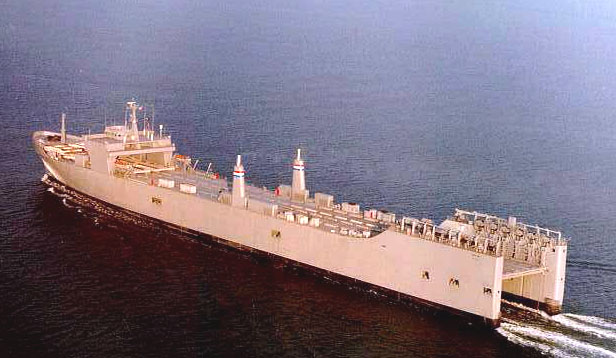
SS Cape May (T-AKR-5063) at C8-S-82a type ship

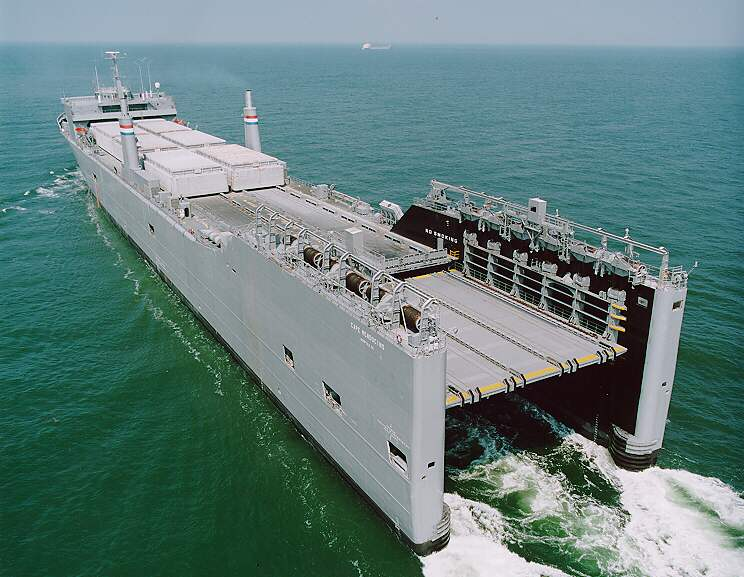
SS Cape Mendocino a type C8-S-82a

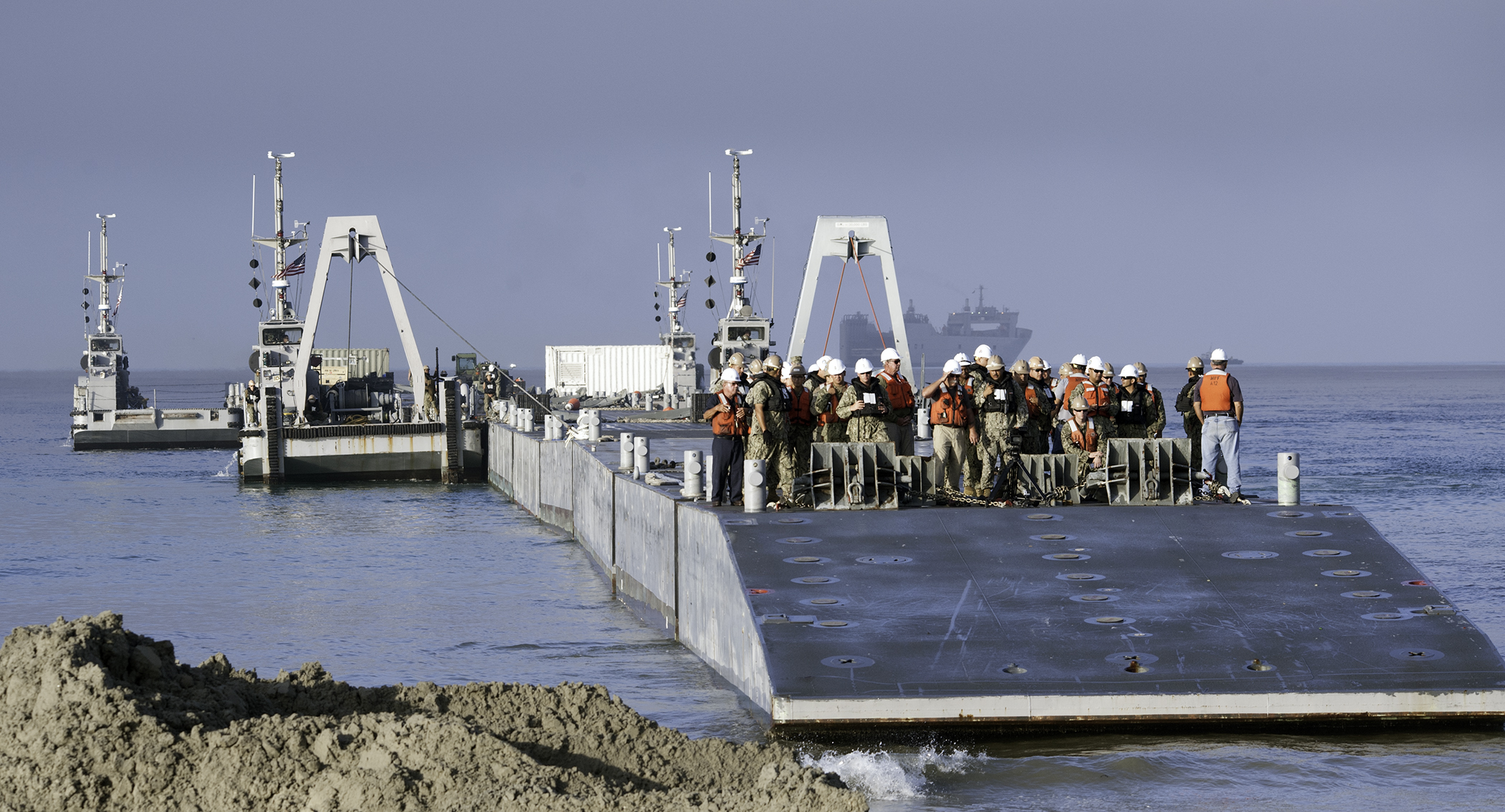
150926-N-KK081-196 (22851642026) The improved Navy lighterage system (INLS)

Another related system was the Sea Bee, which had a lifting system located at the stern of the carrier ship, known as Type C8-class ship. The lift, known as a "Syncrolift" was a platform that could be lowered below the water surface. Two lighters weighing up to 1,000 metric tons are maneuvered onto the submerged platform and raised to the height of the deck, where special rails engage and transport the lighters down the length of the ship to their berthings. The lighters used in the Sea Bee system are considerably larger than the LASH lighter, and the loading hardware is also stronger, with a lifting force of more than 2,000 Mp.

The first ship of a series of three Sea Bee ships was SS Doctor Lykes, followed by SS Almeria Lykes and SS Tillie Lykes all of which were operated by Lykes Brothers Steamship Company. The "Sea Bee" vessels had three decks and could transport 38 lighters (12 on the lower decks and 14 on the upper deck). The dual function of the ship is noteworthy, as it had storage tanks with a capacity of nearly 36000 m³ volume built into its sides and the unusually large double hull, allowing it to be used also as a product tanker. The ships were later purchased by Military Sealift Command.

Finnish state-owned shipbuilding company Valmet built two barge carriers largely based on the Sea Bee system for the Soviet Union in Vuosaari Shipyard in the late 1970s, Yulius Fuchik and Tibor Szamueli. Of these, Yulius Fuchik was featured in a prominent role in the novel Red Storm Rising by Tom Clancy, where it was modified to masquerade as Doctor Lykes.

==== Technical data ====
Seabee-Carrier
Parameters	
Overall length	266.70 m 875.0 ft
Beam	32.26 m 105.8 ft
Height to the first deck	9.70 m 31.8 ft
Height to the main deck	16.10 m 52.8 ft
Height to the upper deck	22.80 m 74.8 ft
Draught	10.00 m 32.81 ft
Capacity	27,500 t 30,300 short tons
Displacement	45,400 t 50,000 short tons
Speed	20 kn 37 km/h; 23 mph
Power	36,000 hp 27,000 kW

Seabee-Lighter
Parameters	
Length	29.75 m 97.6 ft
Beam	10.67 m 35.0 ft
Headway	3.80 m 12.5 ft
Weight	150 t 170 short tons
Capacity	850 t 940 short tons
Draught	3.25 m 10.7 ft

=== BACAT system ===
A Danish project with the name BACAT (Barge-Catamaran) was introduced at the end of 1973. It was used for the transport of several hundred thousand metric tons of load between northern Europe and Great Britain. The system was similar to the Sea Bee, but the lighters were smaller and had an individual load-carrying capacity of only 140 tons.

==== Technical data ====
BACAT-Carrier
Parameters	
Overall length	103.50 m 339.6 ft
Beam	20.70 m 67.9 ft
Headway	10.50 m 34.4 ft
Draught	5.40 m 17.7 ft
Capacity	2,700 t 3,000 short tons
Speed	13 kn 24 km/h; 15 mph
Power	2,250 hp 1,680 kW

BACAT-Lighters
Parameters	Lighter type 1	Lighter type 2
Length	16.80 m 55.1 ft	18.75 m 61.5 ft
Beam	4.70 m 15.4 ft	9.50 m 31.2 ft
Draught	2.47 m 8 ft 1 in	2.50 m 8 ft 2 in
Capacity	140 t 150 short tons	370 t 410 short tons

=== BACO System ===
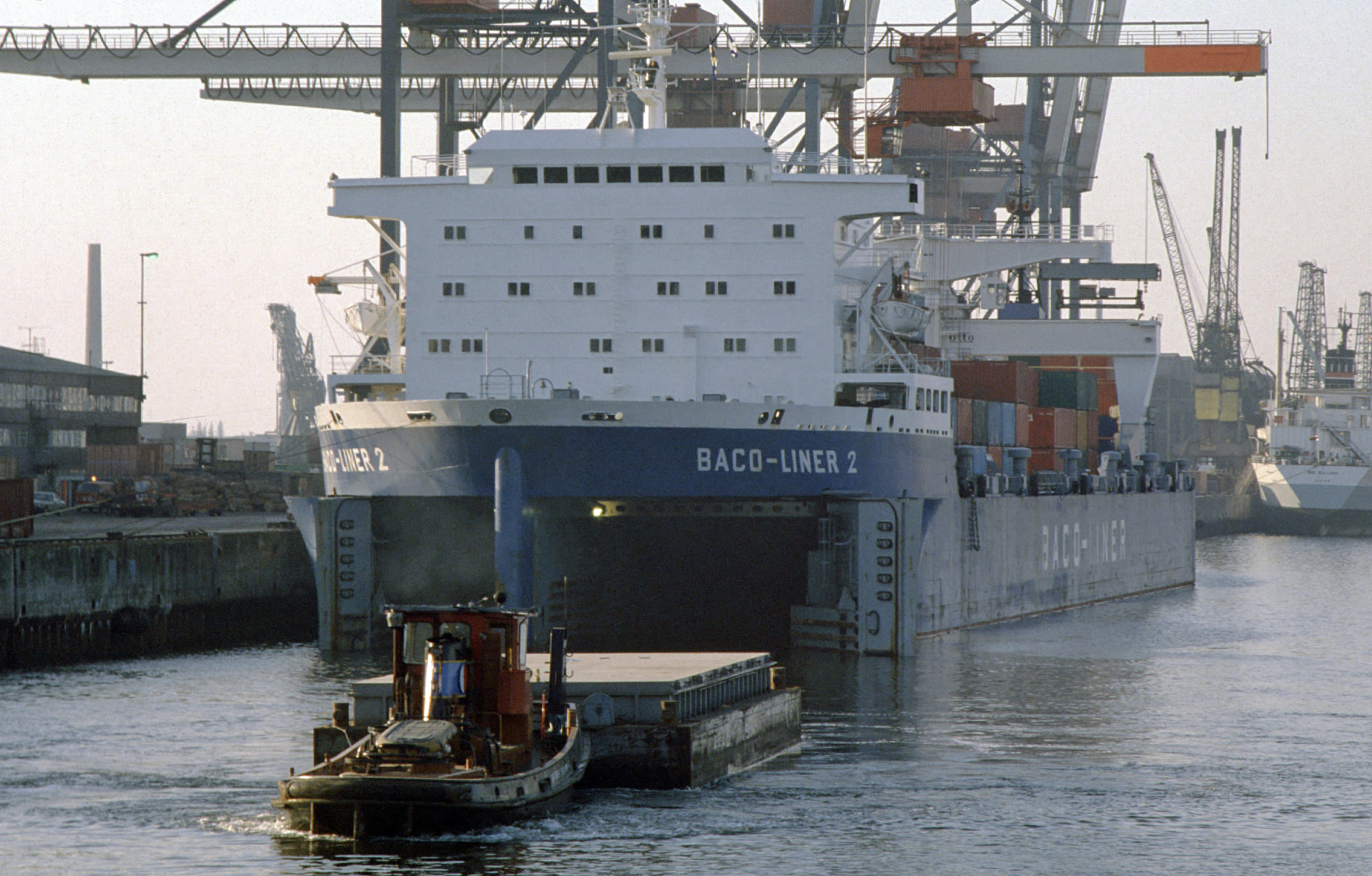
Baco Liner 2 1982 during float-in of barges

1979 saw the introduction of the BaCo system, newly developed by Captain H. Mönke and Thyssen Nordseewerke, in which the carrier could transport barges in addition to standard shipping containers, therefore the name BaCo. In addition, the barges were floated into the flooded hold through bow doors, akin to how ships enter a floating dry dock. The hold could be made watertight by closing two vertically foldable inner doors and two large outer doors; water in the hold could be pumped out during sea passage. The deck was suited for the stowage of containers, for which a movable gantry crane was provided.

The BaCo barges were relatively large compared to the LASH barges, having a deadweight of 800 t, whereby the max. draught was very large with 4.15 m. The BaCo beam of 9.5 m corresponded to the standard beam of European inland waterway transport barges, so that also four Europa barges of Type I could be stored instead of the 12 Baco barges. The container capacity was 652 TEU

In total three Baco Liners were built between 1979 and 1984, named Baco Liner 1, Baco-Liner 2 and Baco Liner 3. Owner was the Baco-Liner GmbH Emden, founded by the shipyard, the Rhein-, Maas- und See-Schiffahrtskontor GmbH (RMS) as well as Rhenus-WTAG, Dortmund. Operator was RMS. The BaCo barges were among others built by Cassens-Werft in Emden.

The Baco-Liners were employed in the liner's service between Northern Europe and West Africa and sailed without major incidents. After the sea transport shifted more and more to containers, the ships were scrapped between 2012 and 2013.

==== Technical data ====
BaCo-Liner
Parameters	
Length over all	204.10 m 669.6 ft
Beam	28.50 m 93.5 ft
Depth	14.50 m 47.6 ft
Draught	6.65 m 21.8 ft
Deadweight	21,100 t 23,300 short tons
Speed	15 kn 28 km/h; 17 mph
Power	10,570 hp 7,880 kW

BaCo shipping units
Parameters	BaCo	LASH
Length	24.00 m 78.74 ft	18.75 m 61.5 ft
Beam	9.50 m 31.2 ft	9.50 m 31.2 ft
Draught	4.15 m 13.6 ft	2.50 m 8 ft 2 in
deadweight	800 t 880 short tons	370 t 410 short tons
