= Binnenvaartmuseum =

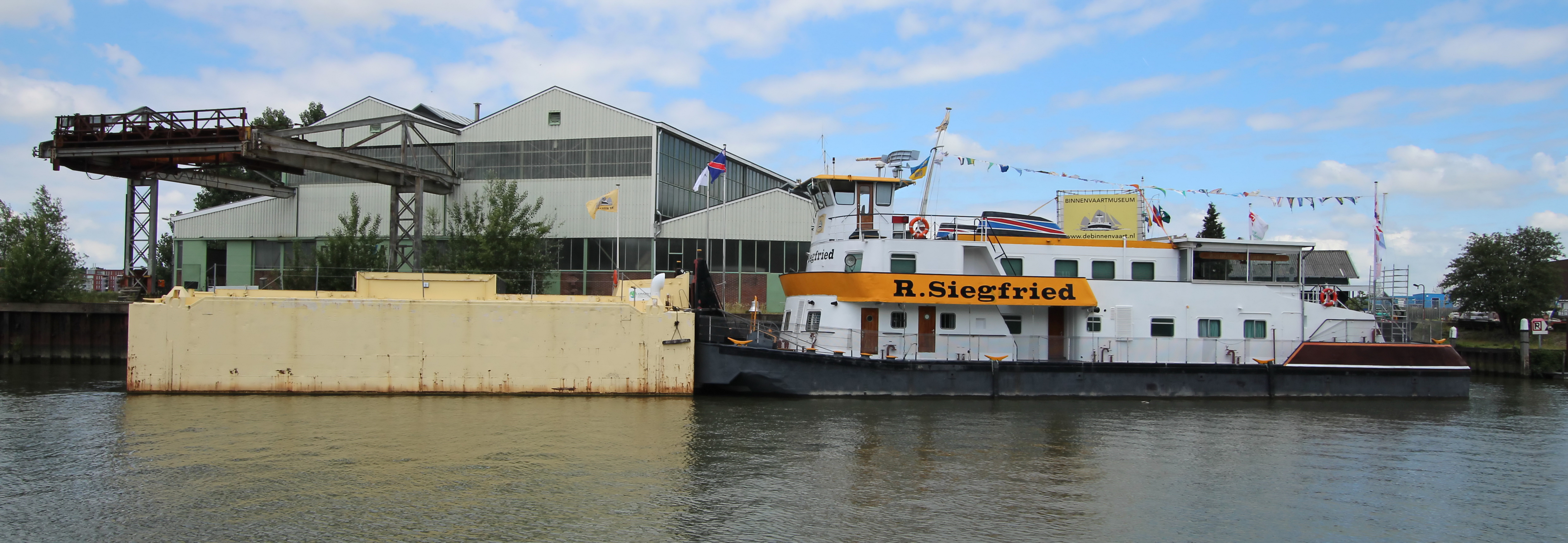
- Left: LASH carrier CG S 6013; Right: pusher boat René Siegfried
- Location: Dordrecht, Netherlands
- Coordinates: 51.8172°N 4.6863°E
- Type: Maritime museum
- Owner: Vereniging De Binnenvaart
- Website: Official website

Binnenvaartmuseum ('Inland Shipping Museum') is a floating museum in Dordrecht, South Holland, Netherlands, on the Wantij waterway near the former shipyard De Biesbosch.

== Description ==
The museum is run by Vereniging De Binnenvaart (established 1990), (Note: A vereniging (nl) is a type of legally-constituted organisation defined in Dutch law, with similar legal rights and responsibilities to other such types of associations and companies, but with its own kind of internal structure, which allows membership both of individuals and of corporate bodies.) which also runs the shore-based Binnenvaartcentrum. Binnenvaartcentrum collects documents relating to inland shipping in the Netherlands and elsewhere.

The museum is centered around René Siegfried, a decommissioned towboat (Dutch: duwboot, a type of working vessel used on inland waterways). René Siegfried was built in 1963 by De Biesbosch for the Strasbourg-based Compagnie française de navigation rhénane (CNFR). In its day, it was one of the most powerful towboats on the River Rhine (which is a major European waterway). It had a crew of 11, later reduced to 9. In 1989, it was taken out of service because of overcapacity in the industry. It was saved from being scrapped, its engines were removed, and it was converted into a floating restaurant containing items of historical interest, moored on the Rhine at Nierstein in southern Germany. In 2004, it was put on the market for sale; and the vereniging bought it, took it to the Netherlands, and refurbished it as a museum. It has been added to the Dutch Nationaal Register Mobiel Erfgoed ('National Register of Moveable Heritage').

In 2008, the vereniging acquired a decommissioned Rhine LASH carrier (registration number CG S 6013), and installed it as an extension to the museum. It is an example of one type of unpowered cargo carrier which René Siegfried would have pushed. In 2018, the vereniging acquired the French-built riverboat Marot, (Note: It has been said that Marot was named after a French resistance fighter who had that name or who had used it as a nom de guerre. If so, that person is not easy to identify.) and added it to their collection. Marot is a surviving example of a Fransemotor ('French motor boat'), one of several such boats built during the postwar years under the Marshall Plan to help European recovery. It was fitted out in 1953 at De Biesbosch as a Rhine working riverboat. It was in service for 65 years (in 1970, it was renamed Jan van Voorst), and was retired in 2018.

The museum is staffed by volunteers (and as a consequence opening times are limited), and entry is free. In addition to its displays of model ships, memorabilia, and the like, the museum has put on several series of themed exhibitions. A centrepiece of the permanent display is the afterpart of the hull of De Jonge Jacob, a wooden cargo carrier (a hektjalk) which wrecked in the Dordtsche Kil near Dordrecht in 1858, and which was partially raised in 2006.

== Pictures ==
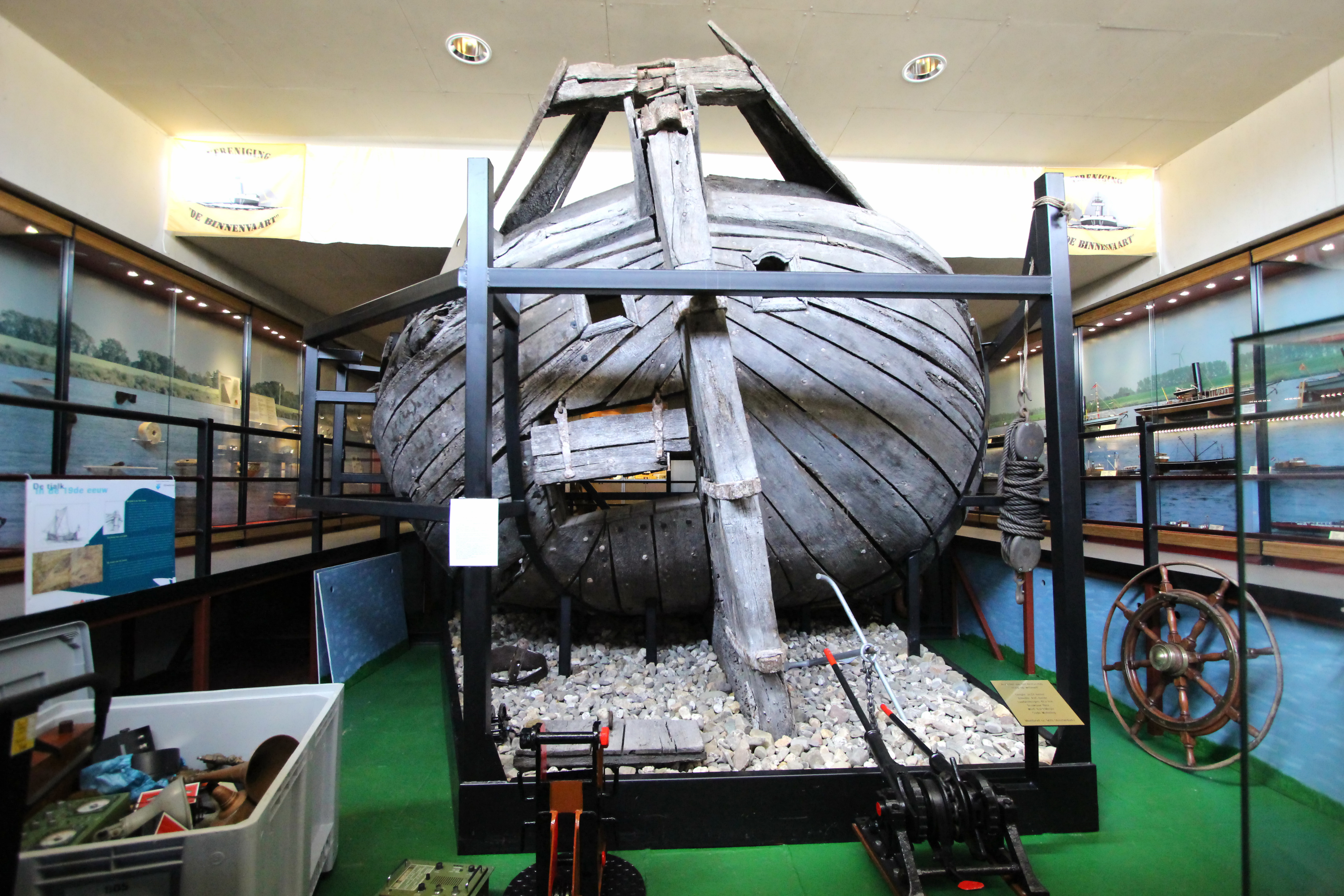
De Jonge Jacob, on display inside the René Siegfried
