= Type C8-class ship =

Type of Heavy Lift Barge Carrier

Type C8
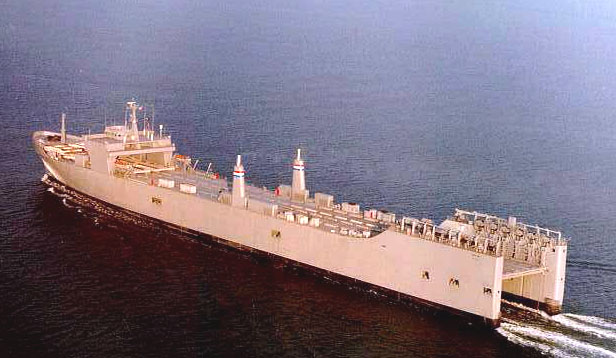
- SS Cape May (T-AKR-5063) at C8-S-82a type ship

Class overview
- Builders: Avondale Shipyard; GD's Fore River Shipyard; Bethlehem Sparrows Point Shipyard
- Built: 1968–1979
- Completed: 26
- Lost: none

General characteristics
- Type: Heavy Lift Barge Carrier: C8-S-81b, C8-S-81d, C8-S-82a, C8-S-85d
- Displacement: 20,574 to - 29,820 deadweight tons.
- Length: 876 ft (267 m)
- Beam: 106 ft (32 m)
- Draft: 40 ft (12 m)
- Installed power: steam turbines 22,109 HP to 32,000 hp
- Speed: 16.2 knots (30.0 km/h; 18.6 mph)
- Crew: 34 when operational

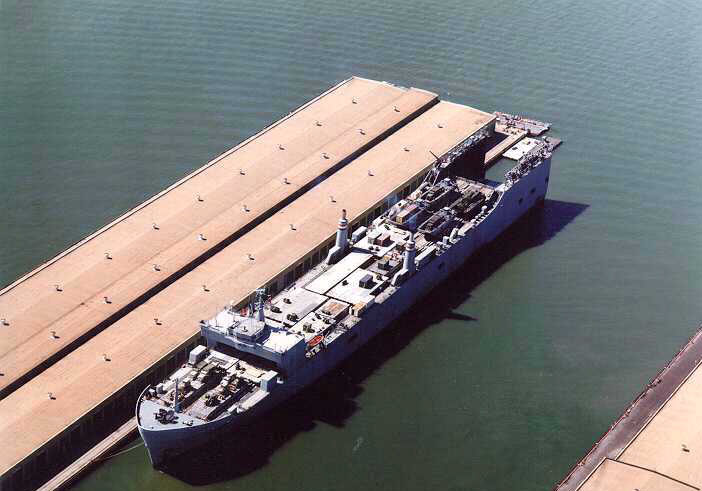
SS Cape Mohican (T-AKR-5065) built as the SS Tillie Lykes a type C8-S-82a

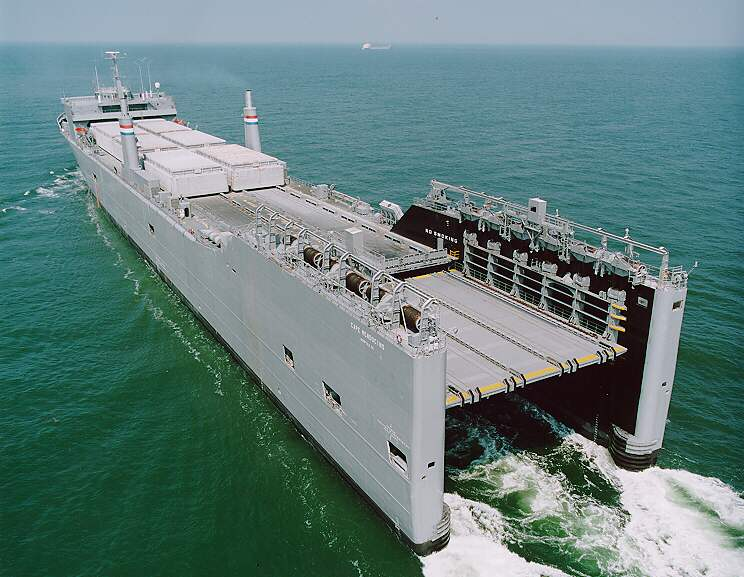
SS Cape Mendocino (T-AKR-5064), a type C8-S-82a

Type C8-class ships are a type of Heavy Lift Barge Carrier. Type C8 ships were the 8th type of ship designed by the United States Maritime Commission (MARCOM) in the late 1960s. As done with the Type C1 ships and Type C2 ships, MARCOM circulated preliminary plans for comment. The design presented was not specific to any service or trade route. Type C8 ships measuring 876 feet (267 m) from stem to stern, and designed to make 16.2 knots (30.0 km/h; 18.6 mph).

== Design ==
The Type C8 ships are a type of Heavy Lighter aboard ship. The lighter aboard ship or LASH is a system for loading barges or (lighters) onto a large vessel for transport. At the destination, the barge are unloaded and the vessel is then free to move on to the next shipment. Barges and lighters are usually unpowered floating platforms for inland waterways that are separated from the open seas. Barge and lighters are typically towed or pushed around harbors, canals or rivers by tugboats. The carrier ships are also known as LASH carriers, barge carriers, kangaroo ships and lighter transport ships. Barges are load into the ship from the rear-stern of the ship. Two barge-lighters weighing up to 1,000 metric tons placed onto an underwater platform. The ship raises the platform up to the deck. On the deck are special rails to move the lighters down the length of the ship to their holding spot. The ship as a loading power to lift with a force of more than 2,000 Mp.

== MARAD Design C8-S-81b ==
In the late 1960s, shipbuilding engineer Jerome L. Goldman designed the first LASH ships the Acadia Forest and the Atlantic Forest. Avondale shipyard start construction in 1969 of the second LASH ships the C8-S-81b. The eleven C8-S-81b LASH ships were of identical design and built from 1970 to 1973. The 11 ships were used by two shipping lines Prudential Grace Line in New York and Pacific Far East Line in San Francisco. The price for each ship was $21.3 million.

== Ships in type ==
- Avondale Industries built eleven C8-S-81b at 29,820 DWT each in 1970 - 1971 for the Grace Line. Example is the SS Lash Turkiye.
- Fore River Shipyard by General Dynamics Corporation Quincy, Massachusetts built three C8-S-82a at 20,574 DWT each in 1972. The three built for the Lykes Brothers Steamship Company: SS Doctor Lykes, SS Almeria Lykes and SS Tillie Lykes.
- Bethlehem Sparrows Point Shipyard built two C8-S-85d at 27,340 DWT each in 1979. The Austral Pioneer and Austral Puritan for the Farrell Lines.

== US Navy Cape M Class Heavy Lift Barge Carrier ==
C8-S-82a were used by the US Navy and called seabee LASH, (Lighter aboard ship).

- SS Cape May (T-AKR-5063) - Built as SS Almeria Lykes C8-S-82a
- SS Cape Mohican (T-AKR-5065) built as the SS Tillie Lykes C8-S-82a
- SS Cape Mendocino (T-AKR-5064) - Built as SS Doctor Lykes C8-S-82a. In October 2011 she was moved to the James River Reserve Fleet to the Beaumont Reserve Fleet to the Beaumont Reserve Fleet.

== Lash Lighter Basin ==
In San Francisco, California is Lash Lighter Basin, located by Heron's Head Park in San Francisco Bay. The Lash Lighter Basin at Bayview–Hunters Point, San Francisco is a protected port that is used by C8-class ships for loading and unloading lighter-barges. Barges from the Stockton Deepwater Shipping Channel, Sacramento Deep Water Ship Channel and Sacramento–San Joaquin River Delta are taken to Lash Lighter Basin. The Lash Lighter Basin is located at 37°44′19.8″N 122°22′18.9″W.

== Notable incident ==
- On May 21, 2001, the SS Cape Mohican (T-AKR 5065) was participating in an exercise at Chilpo Beach, just north of Pohang, South Korea. While in the harbor, heavy winds caused her to drag anchor approximately 150 feet and run aground on rocks, causing damage to her hull and internal tanks. This damage required salvage work and emergency dry-docking along with 1500 tons of steel to make her seaworthy again

== Type C9 ships ==
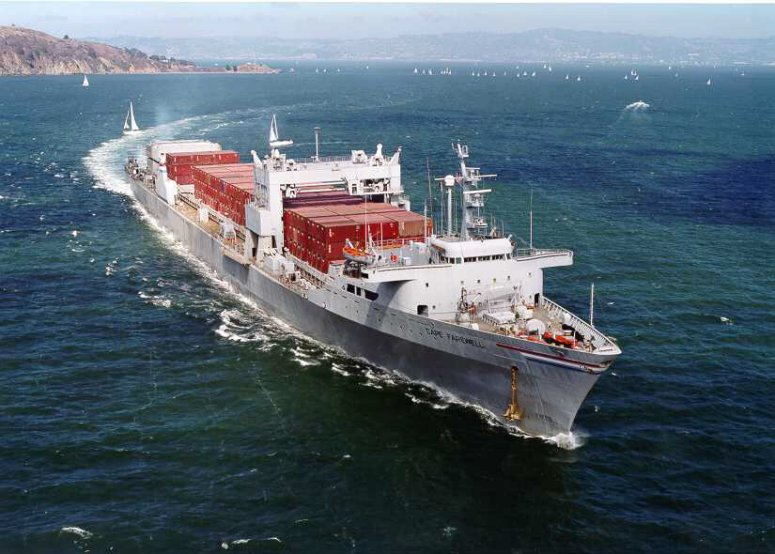
SS Delta Mar, now the SS Cape Farewell (AK-5073), a C9-S-81d

In 1980 Avondale Industries built two 41,500 DWT Type C9-S-81f barge carriers: the SS Edward Rutledge (now SS Spirit and the SS Edward Rutledge (Now MV George II, formerly SS Reliance). In 2024, after a lengthy shipyard period, the SS Reliance was renamed and resumed commercial service as the MV George II, after undergoing a conversion from steam power to LNG-fueled diesel, a modification that was first of its kind. In 1974-75 Avondale Industries built nine 41,000 DWT C9-S-81d barge carriers, some used by the US Navy. C9-S-81d examples are the SS Delta Norte and the SS Delta Mar built in 1971. In 1980-83 Avondale Industries also built three C9-M-132b, but these are 32,800 DWT container ships built for the American President Line: President Washington (now M/V Manoa), President Lincoln (now M/V Mahimahi) and President Monroe (now M/V Mokihana).

== Design C8-S-81b ships ==
MARAD Design C8-S-81b
Name	IMO-Nr.	shipping company	construction number	completion	Later names and fate
Lash Italia	7026912	Prudential Grace Line	1184	1970	Scrapped 1987
Lash Turkiye	7034335	Prudential Grace Line	1185	1971	1978 Delta Caribe, 1987 Cape Florida (T-AK-5071)
Lash Espana	7050248	Prudential Grace Line	1186	1971	1976 Austral Lightning, 1985 Cape Fear (T-AK 5061), July 2006 National Defense Reserve Fleet in Suisun Bay
Thomas E. Cuffe	7105471	Pacific Far East Line	1187	1971	978 conversion to C8-S-F81e container ship, 1979 President Hoover, 1993 Lihue
Golden Bear	7114185	Pacific Far East Line	1188	1971	1977 conversion to C8-S-F81e container ship, 1979 President Grant, 1996 Chief Gadao, 2006 Chief, demolition in Chittagong from May 31, 2006
Pacific Bear	?	Pacific Far East Line	1189	1971	1977 1977 conversion to C8-S-F81e container ship American Trader, 1986 President Harrison, scrapped 1996
Japan Bear	7125316	Pacific Far East Line	1190	1972	1978 Conversion to the C8-S-F81e container ship President Tyler, 1996 Ewa, demolition 2006
China Bear	7207645	Pacific Far East Line	1191	1972	1975 Austral Rainbow, 2000 Ustral, scrapped in Alang from August 16, 2000
Lash Atlantico	7207633	Prudential Grace Line	1192	1973	Scrapped 1996
Lash Pacifico	7216995	Prudential Grace Line	1193	1973	1989 American Kestrel, Scrapped 1995
Philippine Bear	7225714	Pacific Far East Line	1194	1973	1975 Austral Moon, 1984 American Veteran, Scrapped 1995

== Design C8-S-82a ships ==
MARAD Design C8-S-82a for Lykes Brothers Steamship Company
Name	IMO-Nr.	construction number	completion	Later names and fate
Doctor Lykes	7223314	18	1972	1986 RRF Cape Mendocino (AKR-5064)
Almeria Lykes	7205958	19	1972	1986 RRF Cape May (TAKR 5063)
Tillie Lykes	7223314	20	1973	1986 RRF Cape Mohican (T-AKR 5065)

== See also ==
- Type C4 ship
- T2 tanker
- Liberty ship
- Victory ship
