= Tibor Szamueli =

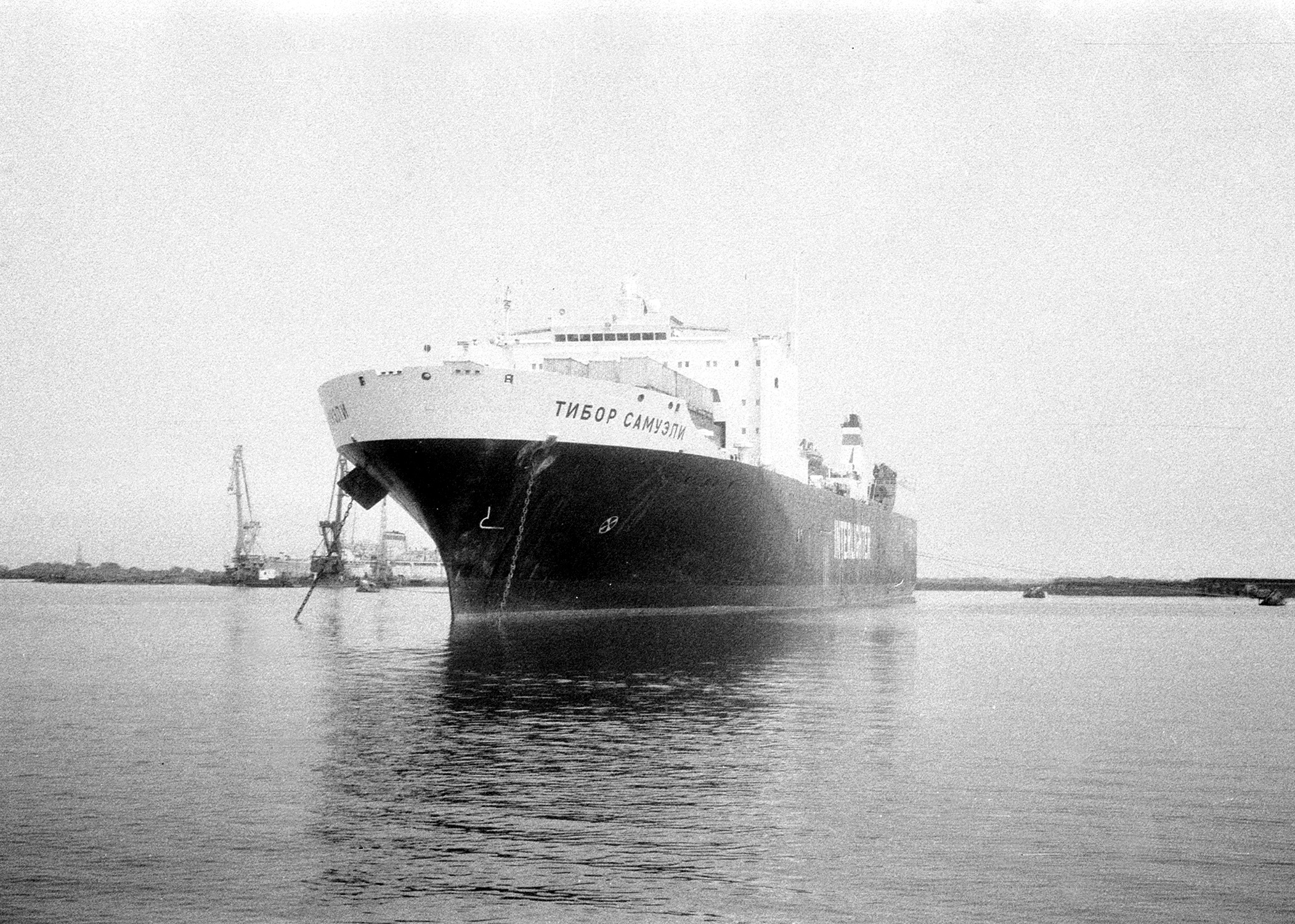
- Tibor Szamueli at Ust-Dunaysk, Ukraine, on 25 August 1992.

History
- Name: Tibor Szamueli (Тибор Самуэли) (1978–1998); Development Driller (1998–2002); Asian Reliance (2002–2003); Reliance (2003); C Reliance (2003)
- Namesake: Tibor Szamuely
- Operator: Interlighter (1979–1998?)
- Port of registry: Izmail, Soviet Union (1979–1991); Izmail, Ukraine (1991–1998?); Limassol, Cyprus (1998?–2002); Panama City, Panama (2002–2003); Ulan Bator, Mongolia (2003)
- Builder: Valmet Vuosaari shipyard (Helsinki, Finland)
- Cost: FIM 350 million
- Launched: 1979
- In service: 1979–2003
- Identification: IMO number: 7505334
- Fate: Broken up in Gadani in 2003.

General characteristics
- Type: Barge carrier
- Tonnage: 35,817 GRT; 15,497 NRT; 37,850 DWT
- Displacement: 60,262 tons
- Length: 266.4 m (874 ft)
- Beam: 35.0 m (114.8 ft)
- Height: 50.5 m (166 ft) from keel to mast
- Draft: 11.0 m (36.1 ft)
- Depth: 23.0 m (75.5 ft)
- Decks: Three cargo decks
- Deck clearance: 6.1 m (20 ft)
- Ramps: 2,600-ton lifting platform in the stern
- Installed power: 4 × Wärtsilä-Pielstick 16PC2-5V400 (4 × 6,620 kW)
- Propulsion: Two KaMeWa controllable pitch propellers
- Speed: 20.5 knots (38.0 km/h; 23.6 mph) (ballast); 19 knots (35 km/h; 22 mph) (service)
- Range: 12,000 nautical miles (22,000 km; 14,000 mi)
- Capacity: 26 1,300-ton lighters; 56 LASH barges 1,552 TEU
- Crew: 50–55

Tibor Szamueli was a Soviet and later Russian barge carrier. Derivatives of the Seabee system, she and her sister ship, Yulius Fuchik, were built in the late 1970s by the Finnish state-owned shipbuilder Valmet in Vuosaari shipyard. As the demand for lighter transport fell in the 1990s, she was sold and eventually broken up.

The ship was named for the Hungarian revolutionary Tibor Szamuely, who had a major role in the short-lived Hungarian Soviet Republic of 1919, her sister ship being called for the Czech Communist hero and martyr of the anti-Nazi Resistance Julius Fučík.

== Career ==
Tibor Szamueli and her sister ship were operated by Interlighter, a company founded in May 1978 by the governments of Bulgaria, Hungary, Soviet Union and Czechoslovakia with the sole purpose of transporting lighters without transshipment between the countries along the Danube river and the countries in South and South-East Asia. The transportation service was offered under the brand "Danube-Sea Line". The barges carried by Tibor Szamueli were loaded in various ports along the Danube river and then pushed downstream to Sulina, Romania, where they were loaded in the ship. They were mainly transported to the Mekong Delta, a voyage that took around 18 days, and pushed upstream as far as Phnom Penh, Cambodia, for unloading. Occasionally, lighters were also carried to Karachi, Pakistan; Bombay, India; and Penang, Malaysia. The service continued until the early 1990s, when the demand for lighters dropped and the ships were laid up.

Both Yulius Fuchik and Tibor Szamueli were sold in the late 1990s and renamed Production Driller and Development Driller respectively, and were laid up in Piraeus, Greece. The ships changed hands again in 2002. Production Driller was renamed Asian Alliance and Development Driller became Asian Reliance. Both ships were sold for scrap in 2003 "as is" in Eleusis, Greece. Asian Reliance was rechristened Reliance and then C Reliance, and scrapped on Gadani Beach, Pakistan.
