= Baco Liner =

Baco-liner
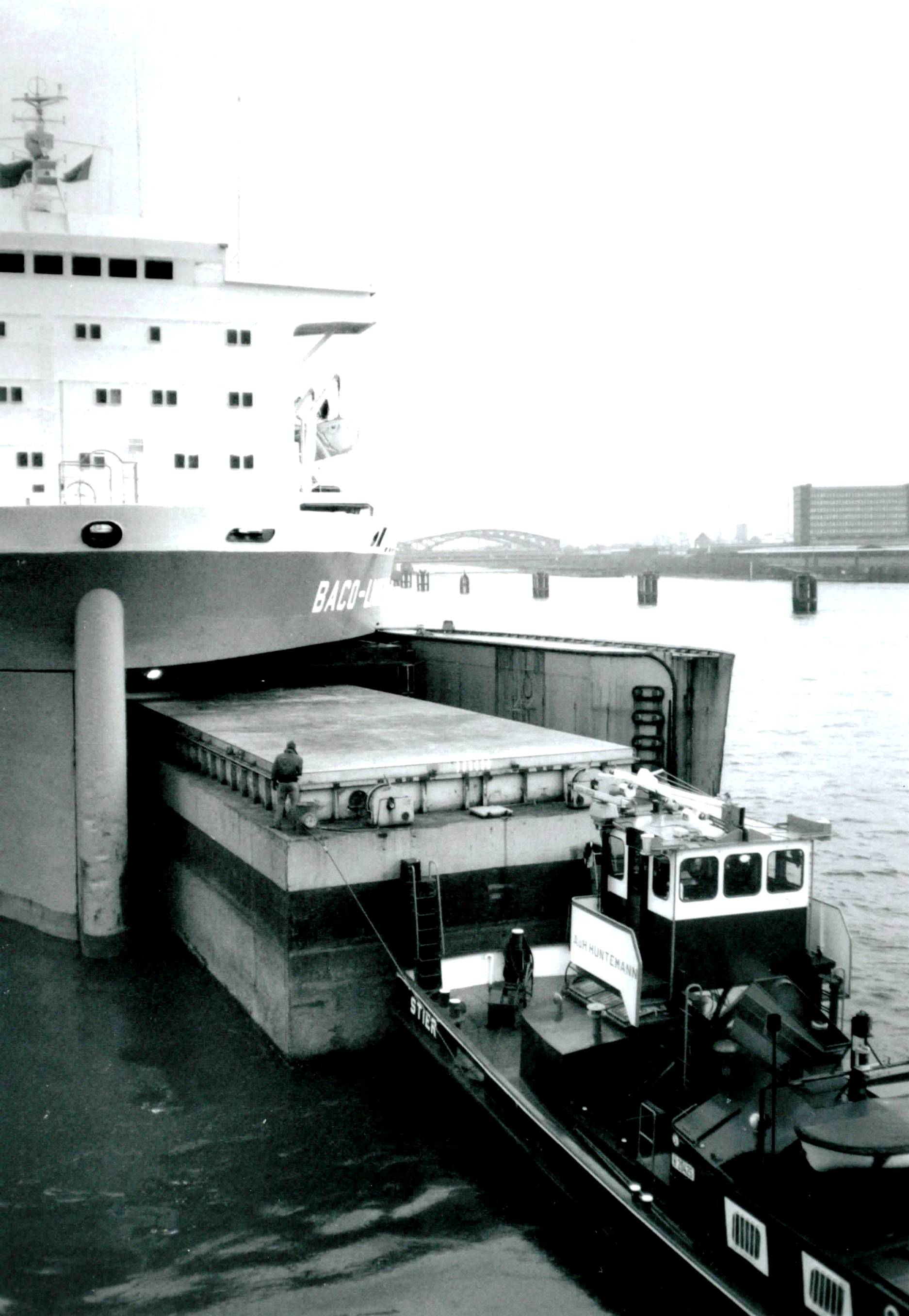
- A barge being loaded into a Baco Liner ship in 1994

Class overview
- Name: Baco-liner
- Builders: Nordseewerke
- Operators: Seerederei Bacoliner GmbH
- Planned: 3
- Completed: 3
- Retired: 3

General characteristics
- Type: LASH ship
- Tonnage: 22345 tonnes
- Length: 205 m (673 ft)
- Beam: 28.5 m (94 ft)
- Draught: 6.65 m (21.8 ft)
- Ramps: 2 bow doors
- Speed: 15 knots (28 km/h; 17 mph)
- Capacity: 12 barges with 800 tonnes each

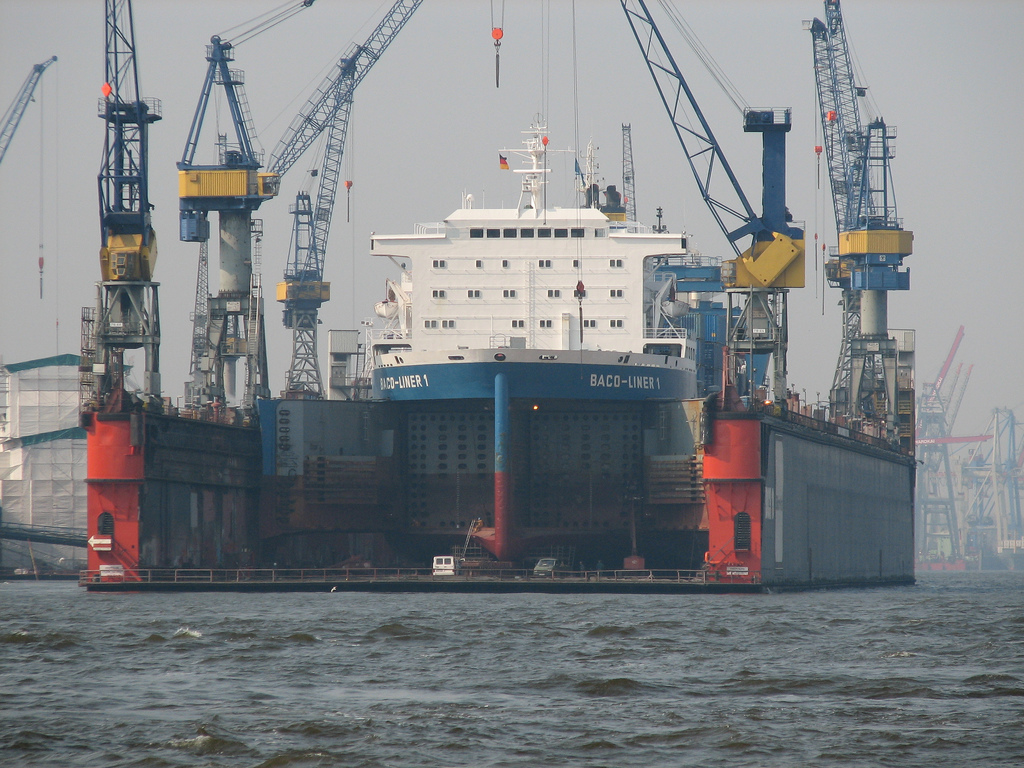
A Baco Liner ship in a Blohm + Voss floating drydock in Hamburg

BaCo Liner an abbreviation for 'Ba'rge - 'Co'ntainer - Carrier, was a shipping service between Europe and Africa owned by Seerederei Bacoliner GmbH of Duisburg, Germany. It used a fleet of specialized barge carrying LASH vessels which have a very unusual design: they carry both conventional shipping containers, and barges that are loaded through twin doors in the bow, a kind of 'float in-float out' arrangement.

This system of barges inside a larger ship allowed cargo to be discharged while at anchor mid-stream in African ports, avoiding port delays. The barges could be loaded up to 800 tonnes each, 12 could be loaded per ship. Container capacity was 500-650 TEU.

Each vessel was approx. 205 m long, 28.5 m beam, operating on a loaded draught of 6.65 m. Gross tonnage 22345 tonnes, deadweight 21800 tonnes including 12 barges with 800 tonnes each. Service speed was 15 knots.

In 2007, 24 Filipino crew of a Baco Liner vessel were kidnapped by pirates in Chanomi Creek, Nigeria.

== Fleet and fate ==
The fleet comprised the three barge carriers: BACO-LINER 1, BACO-LINER 2 and BACO-LINER 3, all completed between 1979 and 1984 by Thyssen Nordseewerke GmbH at Emden. They sailed under the Liberian flag, serving ports between Nouadhibou, Mauritania, and Port Harcourt, Nigeria.

BACO-LINER 3 was scrapped in Alang Beach, India, in July 2012. BACO-LINER 2 followed there in June 2013 and BACO-LINER 1 in August 2013. Vessel tracking services now list all three Baco-liners as scrapped.
