= Lykes Brothers =

Lykes Bros. Inc. is a private company founded by the Lykes Family of Tampa, Florida, in 1910. Today the Florida-based agribusiness is a diverse enterprise that includes cattle, citrus, farming, forestry, hunting, land and water resource management.

In the 1870s Dr. Howell Tyson Lykes abandoned a medical career in Columbia, South Carolina and took over a 500-acre (2.0 km^{2}) family cattle ranch in rural Hernando County north of Tampa. The Lykes Family started the first school in this county in Spring Hill, Florida and the library at the county seat, Brooksville, Florida also bears the Lykes name. Spring Hill refers to the community that grew up around the Lykes Family home called Spring Hill, which is distinct and separate from the later development by the Deltona Corporation by the same name. The family cemetery is located outside of Brooksville.

In 1895, Dr. Lykes moved to Ballast Point in Tampa, Florida where he began shipping cattle to Cuba. Gradually, his seven sons joined the family operations which incorporated in 1910 as Lykes Brothers. This corporation would come to comprise interests in land, citrus, phosphate mining, timber (eucalyptus, pine), sugarcane, a major shipping line (Lykes Brothers Steamship Company), cattle and meat processing, banking (First Florida Bank) and Lykes Insurance Company.

In the 1930s, Lykes Bros. purchased the 265,000-acre (1,070 km^{2}) Lykes Ranch in West Texas, south of Alpine.

Ferguson was chairman and CEO of First Florida Banks in Tampa. The bank and their 144 offices were acquired by Barnett Banks in 1992. By the 1950s, Lykes Bros. Steamships was the largest U.S. shipping line, with 54 cargo ships operating out of Gulf ports. A Lykes Bros. ship would be the first to sail into Shanghai harbor after the U.S. established relations with mainland China. A leader in citrus concentrate, the $15 million Lykes Pasco citrus-processing plant was the biggest in Florida. The corporation took a blow when La Candelaria, the 15,000-acre (61 km^{2}) Lykes estate 250 miles (400 km) east of Havana, was nationalized during the Cuban Revolution. It is now a cooperative farm.

== See also ==
- Lykes Palmdale Airport
- Lykes Building
- Muse, Florida
