= SS Cape May =

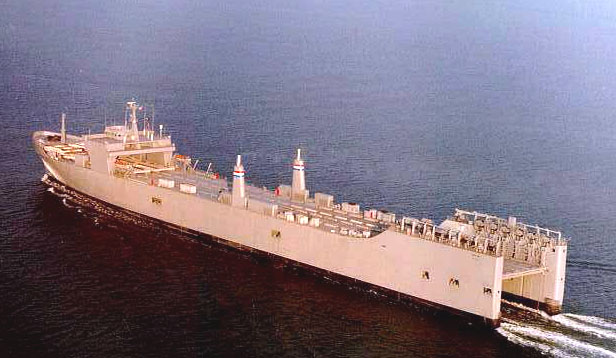

History

United States
- Name: SS Almeria Lykes
- Owner: United States Maritime Administration
- Builder: General Dynamics Quincy Shipbuilding Division, Quincy, Massachusetts
- Laid down: 31 October 1971
- Launched: 27 February 1972
- Acquired: 26 September 1972
- Commissioned: Purchased on 25 July 1986, by United States Maritime Administration
- Renamed: SS Cape May
- Identification: IMO number: 7205958; MMSI number: 366343000; Callsign: WDOU
- Fate: laid up at BRF, Beaumont, TX
- Status: disposal

General characteristics
- Class & type: Heavy Lift Barge Carrier
- Displacement: 18,900 tons empty, 55,660 full
- Length: 876 ft
- Beam: 106 ft
- Draft: 40 ft
- Propulsion: one steam turbine, one shaft
- Speed: 16.2 kts.
- Range: not disclosed
- Capacity: 24 barges, 19 CAFS
- Complement: 34 when operational, 9 while in reserve
- Time to activate: 5 days
- Armament: none
- Aviation facilities: Capable of landing a helicopter but not basing one

SS Cape May (T-AKR-5063) is a steam turbine powered heavy-lift Seabee barge carrier, one of two ships of her type in the Military Sealift Command's Ready Reserve Force.

She was originally built as the Maritime Administration type (C8-S-82a) hull SS Almeria Lykes, ON 536671, IMO 7205958, under MARAD contract (MA 241), for commercial use with the Lykes Brothers Steamship Company. She was laid down on 31 October 1971, at the General Dynamics Quincy Shipbuilding Division, MA, hull no. 18, launched on 27 February 1972, and delivered for service on 26 September 1972. The ship was turned over to MARAD 25 July 1986, and assigned to MSC's RRF as SS Cape May (AKR-5063)

Cape May is used in various tasks for the US military in heavy transport of goods in various theaters of action. She is currently in ready reserve status ready to be called upon for any large cargo work needed.

== See also ==
- SS Cape Mohican (T-AKR-5065), her sister ship
