= Lykes Palmdale Airport =

Private airport in Florida, U.S.

- IATA: none; ICAO: none; FAA LID: FL73

Summary
- Airport type: Private
- Owner: Lykes Brothers Inc.
- Location: Palmdale, Florida
- Elevation AMSL: 42 ft / 12.8 m
- Coordinates: 26°56′52″N 81°19′07″W
- Interactive map of Lykes Palmdale Airport

Runways
Direction	Length		Surface
Direction	ft	m	Surface
9/27	2,200	671	Turf

Lykes Palmdale Airport (FAA LID: FL73) is a small, private airport located in Palmdale, Glades County, Florida, United States, near Lake Okeechobee.

== Facilities ==
Lykes Palmdale Airport has one runway:

- Runway 9/27: 2,200 ft × 150 ft (671 m × 46 m), Surface: Turf
