= Lykes Brothers Steamship Company =

Transport company

Lykes Bros. Steamship Co., also called Lykes Lines, was a cargo shipping company acting from the beginning of the 20th century to 2005 having its main business in the trade to and from the United States.

== History ==
First house flag of the Lykes Brothers

Second house flag of the Lykes Brothers

In 1898, the sons of Dr. Howell Tyson Lykes started a shipping business on the Gulf Coast of Florida. They used a 109-foot, 75 ton three-masted schooner to ship cattle to Cuba as a replacement for herds which were wiped out in the Spanish–American War. The tradition of naming their ships after family members dates back to that time, when this schooner was named Doctor Lykes after their father. Three years later, an office was opened in Galveston, Texas, and Lykes began offering general cargo transportation between the US Gulf and Caribbean ports.

In 1922, the Lykes Bros. Steamship Co. was set up as a separate company, owned by the Lykes Brothers. The seven brothers had been trading cotton, lumber and grain for years so owning their own ships was a natural extension of their operations. During the 1920s, Lykes began to range beyond the Gulf of Mexico and Caribbean. Offices were opened in Europe, and routes were extended to the Mediterranean and Far East.

The 1930s saw Lykes acquiring 52 ships from Dixie and Southern States Lines, giving them a fleet of 67 ships. After passage of the Merchant Marine Act of 1936, they committed themselves to the replacement of their fleet with modern freighters. Sixteen had been delivered by December 1941, when the US entered World War II. During the war, Lykes carried 60 million tons of cargo and operated a maximum of 125 cargo ships for the government. 22 ships were lost along with 272 lives.

During the postwar years, Lykes returned to commercial activity. By the 1950s, it had a fleet of 54 ships totaling 568,978 deadweight tons. That fleet underwent a complete replacement between 1960 and 1973, when 41 new ships were built.

By then, Lykes steamship had become a subsidiary of Lykes Corp., which in 1978, merged with LTV Corp. In 1983, Lykes Bros. Steamship Co., Inc. was purchased by Interocean Steamship Corporation, a Florida corporation whose stockholders included descendants of the original seven Lykes brothers.

With the start of containerization, Lykes was soon participating, becoming a container carrier in the trade lanes of the United States East and Gulf coasts, North Europe, the United Kingdom, the Mediterranean region, Mexico and Africa. Being registered in the U.S., the company had the privilege of being allowed to transport cargo for the U.S. Army.

In December 1994, the company moved its headquarters from New Orleans, LA to Tampa, FL (to the former First Florida Tower (currently the Park Tower) at 400 North Tampa Street). The general offices were later moved to the SunTrust Tower at 401 East Jackson Street in Tampa. In October 1995, the company filed for chapter 11 reorganization. On February 24, 1997, U.S. Bankruptcy Court Judge Alexander Paskay approved a bid by CP Ships, Ltd. to buy Lykes Brothers Steamship Co. In the following years, CP Ships integrated the services of Ivaran Lines which they bought up in May 1998 and Christensen Canadian African Lines (CCAL) which was acquired in August 2000 into the Lykes Lines brand.

In late 2005, the Lykes Lines brand was replaced by the CP Ships brand following CP's one brand strategy promoted by the "One brand – One team" project. CP Ships itself was bought up by TUI AG and merged in mid-2006 in the Hapag-Lloyd organization.

== Awards ==
- IFW Shipping Line of the Year award
- CIFFA award for Best Service to Africa
- Lloyd's Loading List award for Fastest Transit Times on the North Atlantic

== In literature ==
John McPhee's Looking for a Ship (1990), a report on the state of the US Merchant Marine, centers on a South American voyage on the Lykes Brothers freighter Stella Lykes.

The shipping company is referred to in the Tom Clancy novel Red Storm Rising. The Soviet LASH ship Yulius Fuchik, is disguised as the Doctor Lykes for the attack on Iceland in the opening phases of the Soviet battle plan.

== International identifiers ==
SCAC Code: LYKL
Operator Code: LYK
BIC Codes (Container prefixes): LYKU, LYTU

== Vessels ==
- Adabelle Lykes (built in 1942)
- Ashley Lykes
- Frederick Lykes
- Joseph Lykes
- Gulf Banker
- Gulf Trader
- Gulf Shipper
- Marjorie Lykes
- SS Stella Lykes
- SS Ruth Lykes
- Velma Lykes
- SS Cape Mohican
- SS West Cobalt
- MVs Charlotte, Margaret, Adabelle & Sheldon Lykes circa 1000 TEU container ships of the Elbe-Express-Klasse (730 TEU extendable to circa 1000 TEU), bought from Hapag Lloyd in 1984 and refitted to US flag standards, scrapped 1995/1996 at Alang (link points to German Wikipedia article for the class). The other two vessels in the class (730 TEU unextended) ultimately owned by Chinese shipping lines, reflagged People's Republic of China, now scrapped.
- USS Hamul
- USS Lenoir
- USS Libra
- USS Pollux
- USS Valencia

Lykes also operated three Barge carrying ships, unique in design and unlike LASH (Lighter aboard ship) vessels. These ships had a submersible elevator capable of lifting 2 x 1,000-ton barges at a time. The barges were then moved into the ship via a "transporter". This electro/hydraulic "sled" moved onto the elevator and 76 hydraulic jacks lifted the barge just enough to bring it into the ship. It would then lower the barge onto blocks and return to the elevator for another barge. The transporters ran on railroad tracks. These vessels were truly state of the art for their time.

- SS Doctor Lykes, now SS Cape Mendocino (T-AKR-5064)
- SS Almeria Lykes, now SS Cape May (T-AKR-5063)
- SS Tillie Lykes, now SS Cape Mohican (T-AKR-5065)

== See also ==
- CP Ships
- Hapag-Lloyd
