= SS Cape Mohican (T-AKR-5065) =

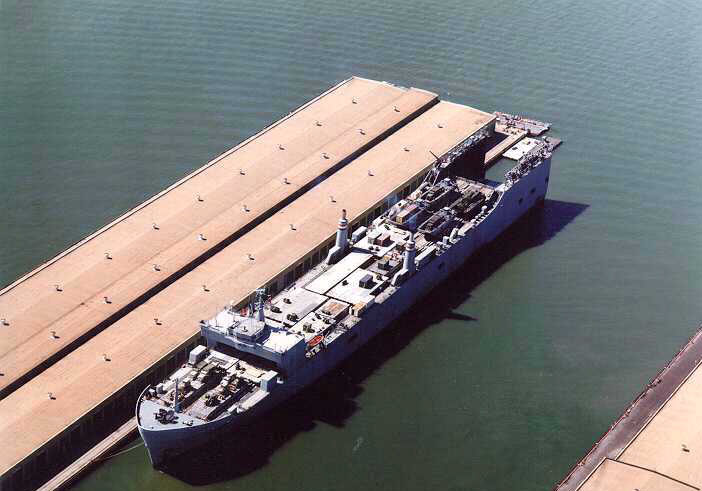

History

United States
- Name: Cape Mohican
- Builder: General Dynamics Shipyard, Quincy MA
- Laid down: 15 July 1971
- Launched: 23 September 1972
- Acquired: 20 March 1986
- Identification: IMO number: 7223314; MMSI number: 366386000; Callsign: WDOP; Hull number: T-AKR-5065
- Fate: Scrapped

General characteristics
- Displacement: 57,290 long tons (58,210 t)
- Length: 873 ft (266 m)
- Beam: 105 ft (32 m)
- Draft: 39 ft (12 m)
- Propulsion: two steam turbines, one shaft
- Speed: 16.2 knots (30.0 km/h; 18.6 mph)
- Complement: 34 (9 at reduced operational status)

SS Cape Mohican (T-AKR-5065) was a steam turbine powered heavy-lift Seabee barge carrier, one of two ships of her type in the Military Sealift Command's Ready Reserve Force. Cape Mohican was activated for service during Operation Desert Storm, and performed various transportation duties over the years. She was berthed at Port of Oakland, California as part of the National Defense Reserve Fleet (NDRF). Regular maintenance and sea trials kept her ready to activate on five days' notice.

Cape Mohican was the source of a 1996 spill of 40,000 US gallons (150,000 L; 950 bbl) of heavy fuel oil in San Francisco Bay causing $3.625 million in natural resources damages.

On 9 July 2021, Cape Mohican was taken by a tugboat out of San Francisco Bay, on her way via the Panama Canal to Texas, after being sold for scrap.

== Construction and commissioning ==
She was originally built as the United States Maritime Administration (MARAD) type (C8-S-82a) hull SS Tillie Lykes, ON 536672, IMO 7223314, under MARAD contract (MA hull 243), for commercial use with the Lykes Brothers Steamship Company. She was laid down on 15 July 1971 at the General Dynamics Shipyard in Quincy, Massachusetts, hull no. 20. The vessel was launched on 23 September 1972, and delivered for service on 16 March 1973. The ship was turned over to MARAD on 20 March 1986, and assigned to Military Sealift Command (MSC)'s Ready Reserve Force (RRF) as Cape Mohican (T-AKR-5065). Cape Mohican was one of three ships in the Cape M class, the other two of which are also named for capes in the United States whose names begin with the letter "M". It was one of several ships in the history of the United States Navy to be named SS Cape Mohican.

== Oil spill ==
On 28 October 1996, while Cape Mohican was in a dry dock just south of the present location of Oracle Park, a worker opened a valve on the ship thinking he was releasing water. Instead of water, fuel oil was released by the valve, and 40,000 US gallons (150,000 L; 950 bbl) of it spilled into San Francisco Bay. Although the spill was modest even in the local history of the bay (it was the largest to take place there between 1988 and 2007), it still polluted 120 miles (190 km) of shoreline and killed hundreds of birds. In 1998, MARAD and San Francisco Dry Dock Inc. paid a court settlement of $8 million, which was split roughly evenly between a fund for environmental restoration and reimbursement to agencies involved in the cleanup.

== Grounding ==
On 21 May 2001, Cape Mohican was participating in an exercise at Chilpo Beach, just north of Pohang, South Korea. While in the harbor, heavy winds caused her to drag anchor approximately 150 feet (46 m)t and run aground on rocks, causing damage to her hull and internal tanks. This damage required salvage work and emergency dry-docking along with 1,500 tons of steel to make her seaworthy again

== See also ==
- SS Cape May, sister ship
