= Avondale Shipyard =

American shipbuilding company

- Formerly: Avondale Marine Ways; Avondale Shipyards, Inc. Avondale Industries, Inc.
- Industry: Shipbuilding
- Founded: 1938 (as Avondale Marine Ways)
- Founders: James Grinstead Viavant; Harry Koch; Perry N. Ellis
- Defunct: October 2014
- Fate: Acquired by Litton Industries; later part of Northrop Grumman; became part of Huntington Ingalls Industries (2011); closed (October 2014)
- Headquarters: 29°55′26″N 90°11′06″W, Bridge City, Louisiana, United States
- Products: Naval and commercial vessels
- Services: Shipbuilding and ship repair
- Number of employees: 26,000 (peak)
- Parent: Huntington Ingalls Industries (2011–2014)

Avondale Shipyard was an independent shipbuilding company, acquired by Litton Industries, in turn acquired by Northrop Grumman Corporation. In 2011, along with the former Ingalls Shipbuilding, the yard was part of Huntington Ingalls Industries. It closed in October 2014. The yard was located on the west bank of the Mississippi River in an area called Bridge City, about 20 miles (32 km) upriver from New Orleans near Westwego, Louisiana. It was the site of the modernization of the battleship USS Iowa in the early 1980s and also constructed some of the lighter aboard ships (LASH). At one time, it was the largest employer in Louisiana, with about 26,000 employees.

== History ==
Avondale Shipyards was founded in 1938 as Avondale Marine Ways by James Grinstead Viavant, Harry Koch, and Perry N. Ellis. It was primarily a repair and barge-construction facility for craft working the Mississippi River. In 1941, the company employed only 200 workers.

They were awarded a contract to build tugboats for the United States Maritime Commission during World War II. This led to further contracts to build destroyers and destroyer escorts.

After World War II, Avondale took advantage of the expansion of the oil industry in Louisiana to build drilling barges and offshore oil rigs. They also built other commercial vessels, such as fishing boats. They again obtained government contracts to build military vessels during the Korean and Vietnam Wars.

Avondale Marine Ways was purchased by the Ogden Corporation in 1959 for $14 million. The following year, it was renamed Avondale Shipyards, Inc. The company was sold to its employees in 1985. In 1988, it became a publicly traded company, Avondale Industries, Inc. Workers voted to unionize with the New Orleans Metal Trades Council in 1993, leading to a lengthy and arduous legal battle between the workers and Avondale Industries. The Metal Trades Union eventually succeeded in 2000. The publication Bayou Worker, archived at Loyola University New Orleans, contains information related to the labor organizing efforts.

In 1998, the company won contracts worth $454.7 million for the construction of two ships by the U.S. Navy (a landing platform dock ship and the Navy's newest amphibious assault ship).

In mid-2010, Northrop Grumman announced its intention to close the Avondale yard by 2013 and consolidate its Gulf Coast shipbuilding operations at its Pascagoula, Mississippi, yard. Northrop Grumman did a spin-off of Northrop Grumman Shipbuilding to Huntington Ingalls Inc. effective as of March 31, 2011. The Avondale yard became the Huntington Ingalls Industries Avondale Operation, a subsidiary of Huntington Ingalls Inc. In February 2013, Avondale Plant was reorganized and entered sector of oil and gas production equipment.

USS Somerset was recorded as the last Navy ship to depart from the Avondale Ship Yard, on 3 February 2014.

== Ships built ==
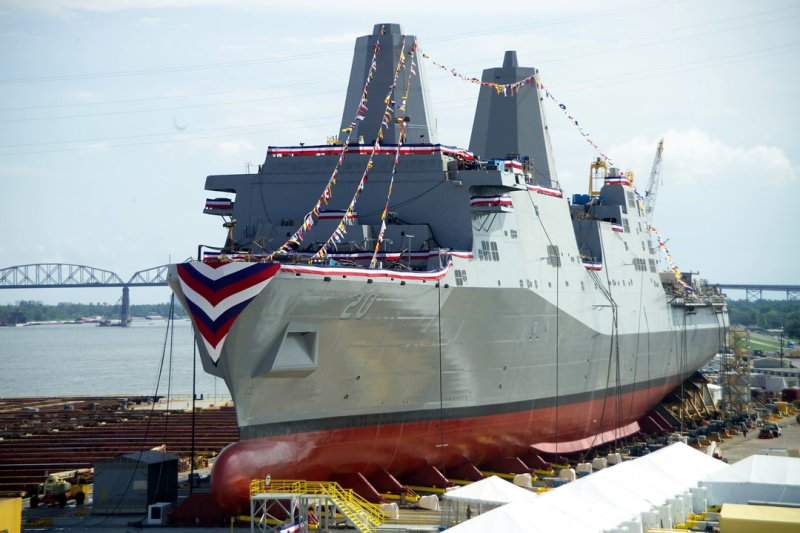
Green Bay ready for launching, 13 November 2004, Grumman Ship Systems, Avondale, LA.

Ships built by Avondale include:

- APL C-9-class container vessels (1980–1983), originally President Monroe, President Washington, and President Lincoln. These are now operated by Matson Navigation Company as M/V Manoa, Mahimahi, and Mokihana, respectively.
- MARAD Design C9-S-81d and C8-S-81d class (LASH-ships)
- USCGC Healy United States Coast Guard (USCG) icebreaker and research vessel (1999)
- San Antonio-class amphibious transport docks (6 out of 9 ships, 2000–present) including USS New York built with steel from the World Trade Center towers destroyed in the 9/11 attacks and USS Somerset built with steel from a crane that stood near Flight 93's crash site also destroyed on 9/11.
- Harpers Ferry-class dock landing ships (4 out of 4 ships, 1991–97)
- Whidbey Island-class dock landing ships (5 last of 8 ships, 1986–90)
- SS Velma Lykes, now TS Kennedy, training ship for Massachusetts Maritime Academy
- Cimarron-class fleet replenishment oilers (5 out of 5 ships, 1981–1983)
- Henry J. Kaiser-class fleet replenishment oilers (14 out of 16 ships, 1984–96)
- Bob Hope-class vehicle cargo ship (7 ships build between 1993–2001)
- Hamilton-class USCG high-endurance cutters (12 out of 12 ships, 1967–72)
- Knox-class frigates (27 out of 46 ships, 1967–74)
- USCGC Greenbrier - USCG river tender
- Vernon C. Bain Correctional Center, a New York City prison ship (1992)

== See also ==
- Pendleton Shipyard Company
- Lockheed Shipbuilding and Construction Company
