= Federal Shipbuilding and Drydock Company =

1917–1948 shipbuilding company in the United States

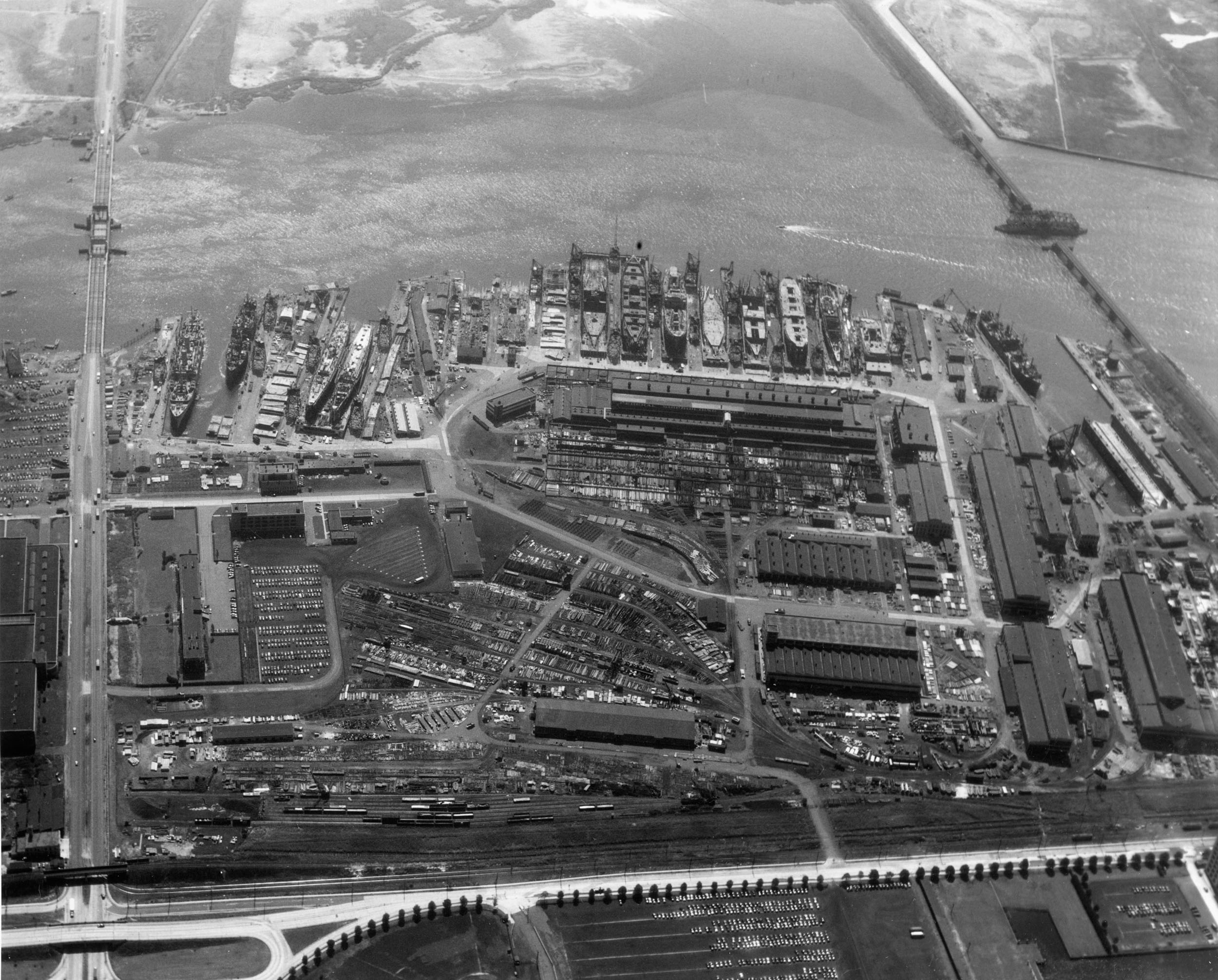
- Federal Shipbuilding and Dry Dock Company, 1945
- Industry: Shipbuilding
- Founded: July 24, 1917
- Defunct: 1948
- Fate: liquidated
- Headquarters: Kearny, New Jersey
- Parent: United States Steel Corporation

The Federal Shipbuilding and Drydock Company was a United States shipyard in New Jersey active from 1917 to 1948. It was founded during World War I to build ships for the United States Shipping Board. Unlike many shipyards, it remained active during the shipbuilding slump of the 1920s and early 1930s that followed the World War I boom years. During World War II, it built merchant ships as part of the U.S. Government's Emergency Shipbuilding program, at the same time producing more destroyers for the United States Navy than any yard other than the Bath Iron Works. Operated by a subsidiary of the United States Steel Corporation, the shipyard was located at Kearny Point where the mouth of the Hackensack River meets Newark Bay in the Port of New York and New Jersey.

Around 570 vessels were contracted for construction by Federal SB&DD Company with about 100 not delivered fully completed due to the end of the World War II. Federal also had a yard at Port Newark during World War II that built destroyers and landing craft.

== History of the Federal Yard at Kearny ==
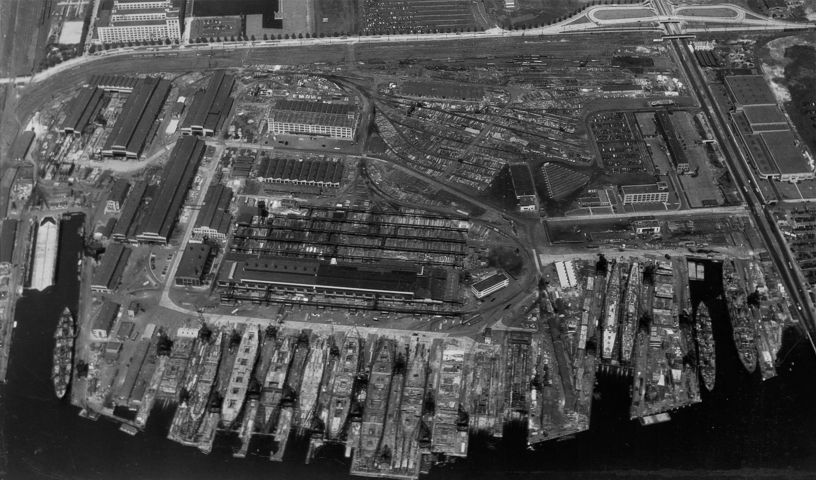
Aerial view of Federal Shipbuilding in May 1945

Federal Shipbuilding and Dry Dock Company was founded July 24, 1917, as a subsidiary of United States Steel Corporation to supply ships for the United States Shipping Board during World War I. The site on Kearny Point was first surveyed during the summer of 1917. The shipyard was to consist of everything needed to fully complete a ship from a facility power plant to a wood joining shop. A steel plate mill and boiler shop were to be built as well. $10 million ($251 million today) was allocated for construction. The American Bridge Company was contracted to provide 10,000 tons of steel for the structures. E. H. Gary was president of Federal in August 1917. The ship-ways were completed by the fall of 1917 with keels being laid by November 1917. Federal completed a 9,600-ton ship around six weeks before World War I ended as well as two other ships before the close of 1918. 27 ships were delivered to the Emergency Fleet Corporation in 1919. Federal accounted for 5% of the steel merchant tonnage built in 1919.

By June 1921, the Federal yard at Kearny had a 535 by 161.5 feet (163.1 m × 49.2 m) boiler construction shop to build Scotch marine boilers, exhaust stacks, tanks, uptakes and other related items. 235 boilers had been constructed from September 1919 to June 1921. Boilers constructed there were mostly 15 feet (4.6 m) diameter or larger. At that time, 250 men were able to construct three boilers a week with a single 8-hour shift each day.

By November 1921, Federal had shipbuilding ways for twelve 15,000-ton vessels and had constructed a 9,000-ton floating dry dock. The dry dock was first used June 23, 1921, when Transmarine Corp.'s SS Suhulco docked. The Kearny yard was 17 acres (6.9 ha) with 2,400 feet (730 m) of frontage on the Hackensack River. A wet basin was located at the southern end with a 100-ton 3-legged jib crane for fitting out new ships.

On Sunday night, May 18, 1924, a fire destroyed the largest building at the Kearny yard causing an initially estimated $500,000 in damage. Other estimates were $1.6 million or as high as several million dollars in damage. Firemen used four mobile cranes to try to extinguish fires in the pattern building and the plate shop. Over a thousand workers were idled by the fire. The shipyard had around 5,000 workers at the time and was said to be one of the largest steel fabrication plants in the world. Fireboats and numerous firemen from around the area were called in to fight the fire which spread rapidly through the wooden structures at the Kearny yard.

The Federal yard at Kearny remained operational during the difficult interwar period and Great Depression when many shipyards across the country did not.

=== 1940 to closure ===
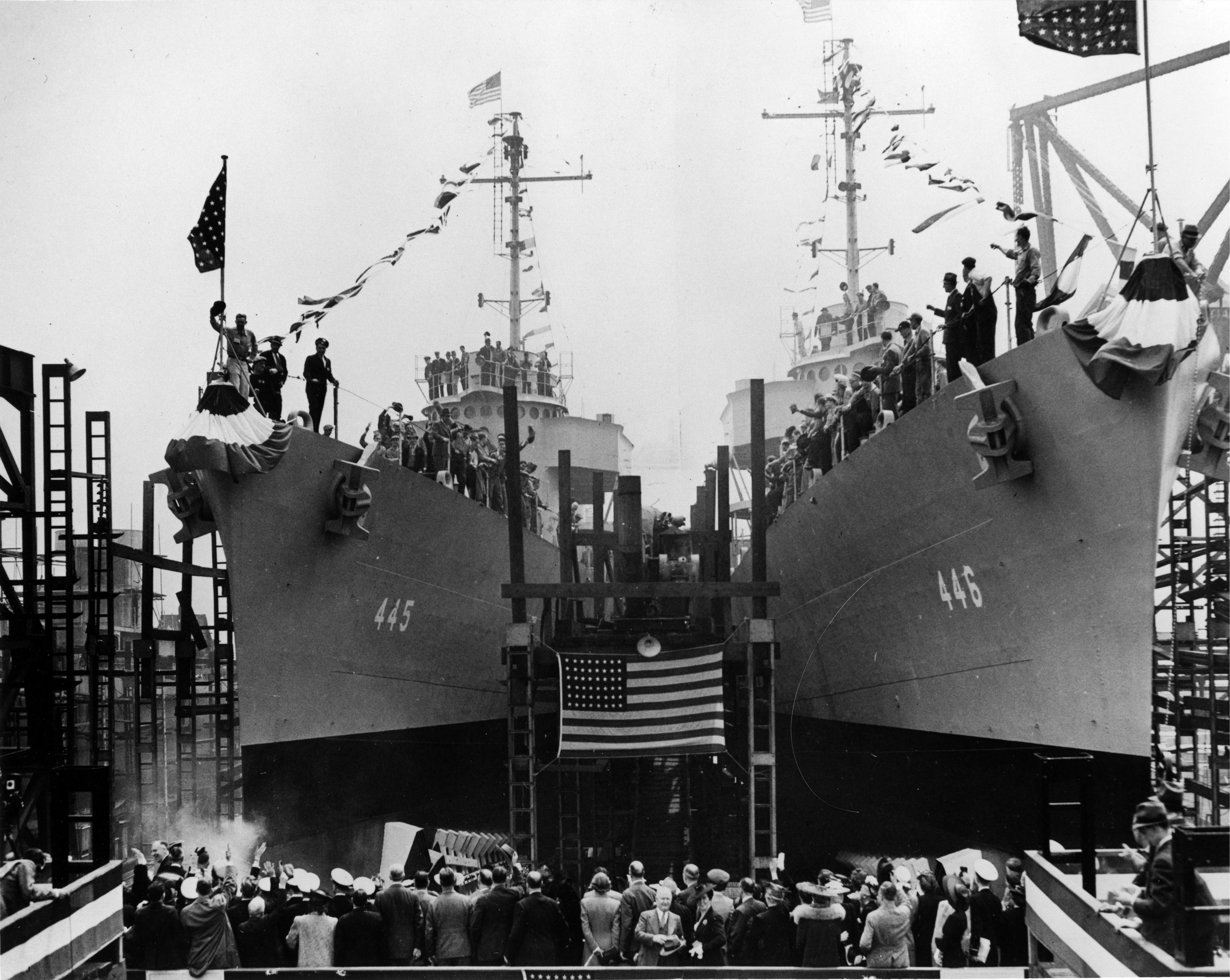
May 1942 launch of USS Fletcher (DD-445) and USS Radford (DD-446) at Federal. 2 of the 4 destroyers launched on May 4, 1942.

Federal made national news when around 16,000 workers went on strike at Kearny from August 7 to August 25, 1941. Work was stopped on $493 million ($10.8 billion today) in Navy and merchant shipbuilding contracts as the nation ramped up ship construction before entering World War II. The strike was ended when President Franklin D. Roosevelt ordered the Navy to seize control of the facility. The final sticking point in negotiations had been the refusal of management at Federal to accept demands to require a "maintenance of membership" clause which would effectively make the shipyard a closed shop. Company president Lynn H. Korndorff offered the shipyard to the Navy rather than accept the demands to become a closed shop.

When the Navy took over, the yard fell under the supervision of Rear Admiral Harold G. Bowen Sr. as Officer-in-charge. It was the first take over of an industrial plant by the Navy in that era. While the union was enthusiastic about the seizure, they did not get the response they were expecting when the Navy took control. According to Rear Admiral Bowen in his autobiography, while he was cordial with labor, he refused to acknowledge any union's right to collectively bargain for the workers at Kearny. He also refused to take steps to implement the "maintenance of membership" issue. By November 1941, the "maintenance of membership" clause was still not being enforced and the union sought relief from the Defense Mediation Board.

After 134 days of operation by the Navy, control of the shipyard was returned to the company on January 6, 1942. Under Navy control the shipyard laid 12 keels, launched 10 and commissioned 7 ships. Secretary of the Navy Frank Knox returned the shipyard and asked that the company and union work out the remaining issue. Failing that, the two parties would use newly established national machinery to resolve the dispute. The "maintenance of membership" issue had still not been resolved. In May 1942, Federal finally gave in to demands to require membership in the CIO Industrial Union of Marine and Shipbuilding Workers. Company president Lynn H. Korndorff said Federal only complied with the order of the National War Labor Board because of the war emergency. The incident was viewed as one of the first major tests of the NWLB.

According to John T. Cunningham in "Made in New Jersey," Federal "completely proved its might". On one day alone in May 1942, the company launched four destroyers in a 50-minute period. By 1943, Federal Shipbuilding was employing 52,000 people and building ships faster than any other yard in the world."

Federal continued to set company construction speed records throughout the war. In July 1943, Federal claimed records of 170 days from keel to commissioning on the 2,050-ton Fletcher-class destroyer USS Dashiell (DD-659) and 137 days on the 1,630-ton Gleaves-class destroyer USS Thorn (DD-647). Federal also said Type C2 ships were being built in an average time of 82 days. In July 1943, destroyer escorts were being launched about once a week since spring of 1943. Between the Newark and Kearny yards, Federal launched a company record of 11 ships in 29 days during March 1943.

After World War II ended, a number of destroyers were cancelled including some that were partially constructed. Federal had contracts to build several cargo ships for the United States Maritime Commission. Five Type C3-class ships were for Lykes Lines and six for American South African Line. Two bulk carriers were built for National Gypsum and three Type C2 ships for Grace Line's "Santa" / South American passenger-freight service. Federal also converted SS Uruguay from wartime service for Moore-McCormack starting in 1946.

4,000 shipyard workers at Federal joined 90,000 other east coast shipyard workers in a strike action on 1 July 1947. The strike at Federal ended in November 1947 after 140 days.

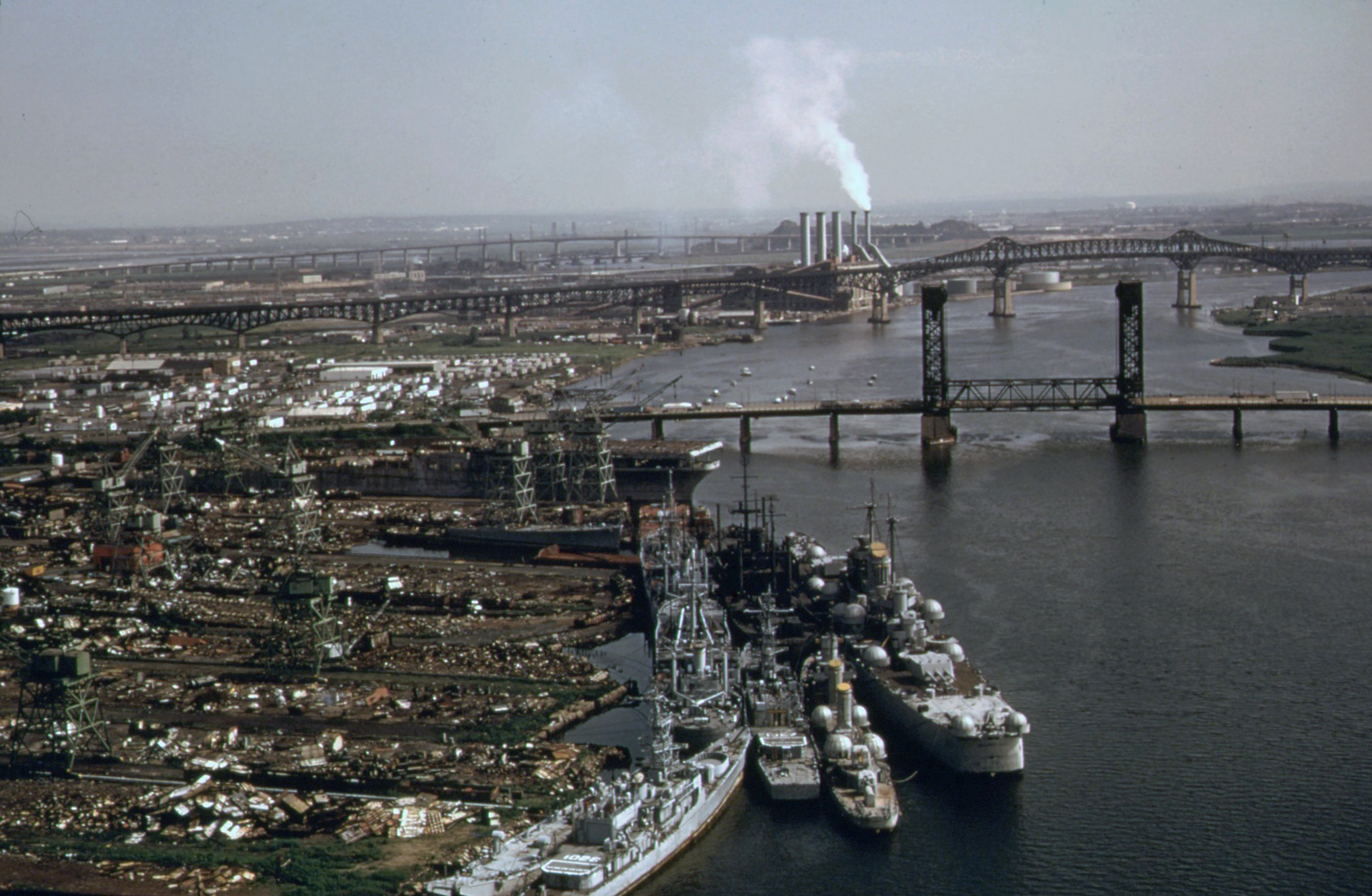
Site of the former Federal yard at Kearny in foreground on left, c.1974.

On April 23, 1948, Lynn H. Korndorff, the President of Federal Shipbuilding and Drydock Company announced that the US Navy had agreed to purchase facilities at Kearny for around $2,375,000 ($31.8 million today), its depreciated book value. The Navy planned to hold the facility in a standby state for potential emergency reactivation. The New York Times regarded this sale price to be "astoundingly low". In July 1948, Federal's large floating dry dock was towed 1,700 miles in 19 days to Gulf Shipbuilding Corporation's Chickasaw, Alabama, shipyard, which had been constructed during World War I by U.S. Steel, parent of Federal SB&DD.

Around 465 ships were delivered by Federal SB&DD Company out of its 569 hull numbers allocated. 325 were delivered from the Kearny yard and 140 from Port Newark.

Instead of building ships, the site eventually hosted a salvaging operation where numerous ships were scrapped. In 1975, the former Federal yard was described as one of the nation's largest ship breaking yards. According to the 1975 head of the River Terminal Development Corp, the first ship to be scrapped at the yard was USS Enterprise (CV-6) in 1959. Other carriers scrapped there included Essex, Randolph, Boxer, Wasp and Antietam. Battleships, battle cruisers, cruisers and submarines had also been scrapped at the former Federal yard as of the mid-1970s. Texas Tower 3 was also scrapped at the Federal yard by Lipsett Corp.

=== Current use ===
Portions of the Federal yard have been converted into warehouses and mixed-use business parks by property developers including River Terminal Development Corp. and the Hugo Neu Corporation. In November 2013, Federal's Building 77 completed its renovation and reopened as the USS Juneau Memorial Center, which now houses Hudson County's Office of Emergency Management. During the COVID-19 pandemic, the Juneau Center became a county-operated vaccination mega-site.

== Ships built at Kearny ==
=== Military ships ===
The Federal Shipbuilding and Drydock Company built eleven classes of ships for the U.S. military. Of the 387 ships of those classes constructed nationally, 108 came from Kearny. Of the 415 World War II–era destroyers of all classes produced nationally, 69 came from Kearny.

- Light cruisers
  - Atlanta-class (2 of 8) – CL-51–CL-52 in 1940 – 1941
  - Juneau-class (all 3) – CL-119–CL-121 in 1945 – 1946
- Destroyers
  - Mahan-class (2 of 18) – DD-368–DD-369
  - Somers-class (2 of 5) – DD-381, DD-383
  - Benham-class (3 of 10) – DD-397–DD-399
  - Sims-class (2 of 12) – DD-411–DD-412
  - Gleaves-class (26 of 66)
    - (4 of 18, interwar era) – DD-431–DD-432, DD-439–DD-440
    - (22 of 48, WWII era) – DD-453–DD-456, DD-483–DD-490, DD-618–DD-623, DD-645–DD-648
  - Fletcher-class (29 of 175) – DD-445–DD-448, DD-465–DD-466, DD-498–DD-502, DD-659–DD-661, DD-666–DD-680
  - Allen M. Sumner-class (18 of 58) – DD-692–DD-709
- Attack cargo ships
  - Andromeda-class (21 of 32) – AKA-15–AKA-20, AKA-53, AKA-55, AKA-58–AKA-63, AKA-94–AKA-100

==== Canceled orders ====
USS Buffalo (CL-84) and USS Newark (CL-88) were cancelled 16 December 1940.

=== Merchant ships ===
The last ships for the United States Shipping Board were delivered by January 1920. Federal Kearny built 30 of the 48 Design 1037 ships. These were the very first ships built at the site, with yard numbers 1 through 30.

- USSB #955–#964
  - Liberty, Federal -> Fukuzan Maru. Piave, Mercer, Marne → Yuzan Maru, The Lambs
  - Homestead, Duquesne, McKeesport, Braddock
- USSB #1422–#1441
  - Donora, Lorain
  - Waukegan, Youngstown, Ambridge, Clairton, Innoko, Wytheville
  - Belfort, Westmoreland, Bellbuckle, Vincent, Bellhaven, Winona County
  - Bellepline, Anaconda, Bellerose, Kearny, Bellflower, Bellemina

For private contractors

- 18 cargo ships for the parent company U.S. Steel / the Isthmian Steamship Company
  - Steel Age, Steel Maker, Steel Voyager, Steel Worker, Steel Mariner (6,000t, 1920)
  - Steel Trader, Steel Exporter, Steel Engineer, Steel Inventor, Steel Ranger (6,000t 1920)
  - Steel Seafarer, Steel Scientist, Steel Navigator (6,000t, 1921)
  - Steel Traveler (7,000t, 1922)
  - Steel Motor, Steel Vendor (1,700t, 1923)
  - Steel Chemist, Steel Electrician (1,700t, 1926)
  - See also: related work done in Chicksaw
- 11 tankers for Standard Oil of New Jersey
  - Walter Jennings, E. T. Bedford, J. A. Moffet Jr. (9,600t / 9,800t, 1921)
  - R.P. Resor, T. C. McCobb (7,500t, 1936)
  - Esso Bayonne, Esso Bayway (7,700t, 1937)
  - Esso Houston, Esso Boston (7,700t, 1938)
  - Esso Montpelier, Esso Concord (7,700t, 1940)
- 4 passenger ships for the Grace Line (9,100t)
  - Santa Rosa, Santa Paula (1932)
  - Santa Lucia, Santa Elena (1933)
- 5 tankers for Pan-American Patroleum
  - Pan-Maine, Pan-Florida (7,200t, 1936)
  - Pan-New York, Pan-Maryland (7,700t, 1938)
  - Pan-Rhode Island (7,700t, 1941)
- 2 tankers for Imperial Oil in 1921 (11,000t, 1921)
  - Vancolite, Victolite
- tanker Gulfpride for Gulf Oil in 1927 (12,500t)
- passenger Dixie for the Southern Pacific SS Line 1928 (8.200t)
- 2 tankers for Standard Shipping in 1930
  - G. Harrison Smith, W. S. Farish

Several ships for the Maritime Commission were built before the war broke out.

- 3 T3 in 1939
  - Markey, Neosho, Esso Trenton
- 6 C2 in 1939 and 1940
  - Challenge, Red Jacket, Lightning, Flying Cloud, Flying Fish
- 6 C3 in 1940 and 1941
  - Sea Fox, Sea Hound, Sea Panther, Almeria Lykes, Howell Lykes, Mormacyork
- 5 C1-B in 1940 and 1941
  - Joseph Lykes, Zoella Lykes, Reuben Tipton, Fred Morris, John Lykes
  - 2 DeLaval Trenton. steam turbines, double reduction gears, 1 shaft, uncertain: Fred Morris

== Federal Yard at Port Newark ==
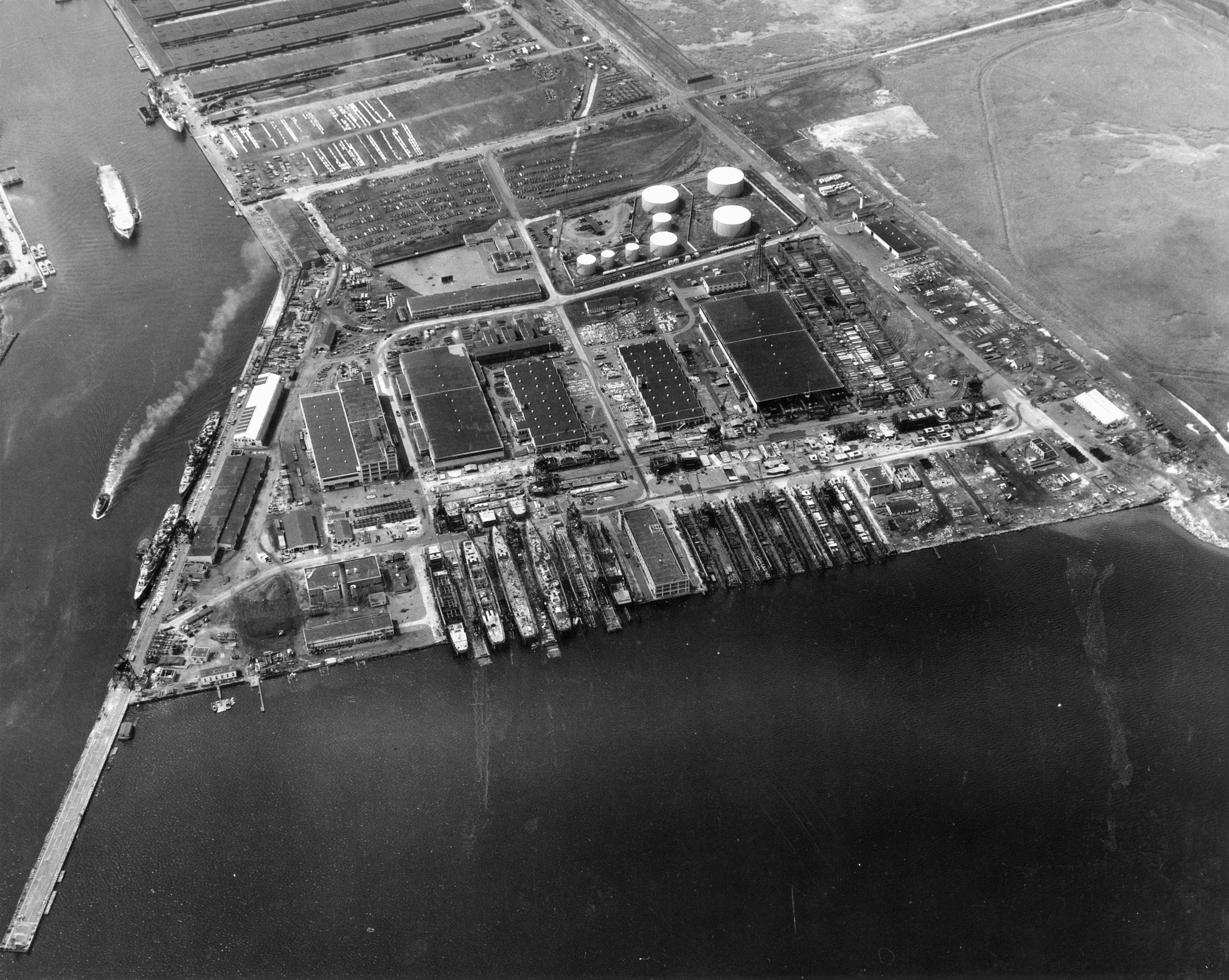
Yard at Newark in 1945

In January 1942, Federal Shipbuilding and Drydock Company announced they were expanding their facilities to increase capacity and employ an additional 10,000 workers. They expanded to the site of the former Submarine Boat Corporation at Port Newark (40.69306°N 74.12960°W). After nine months of construction to rebuild the facility, the first ships were launched at the Port Newark yard on October 10, 1942. All of the Gearing-class destroyers built at Federal were built at the Newark yard. The Port Newark yard closed after the war and the site gained some notoriety in late 1947 during a dispute over the scrapping of the battleship New Mexico and two others by Lipsett Corp. The site was an automobile terminal parking lot in the 2010s.

- 36 of 923 LCI(L)
  - #161 ... #196
- 52 of 563 destroyer escorts and APDs
  - 36 of 72 Cannon-class destroyer escorts (built October 1942 - January 1944)
    - Levy (DE-162) ... Roche (DE-197)
  - 16 of 83 John C. Butler-class destroyer escorts (built November 1943 - August 1944)
    - Corbesier (DE-438) ... Joseph E. Connolly (DE-450)
    - Gilligan (DE-508) ... Heyliger (DE-510)
- 10 of 415 destroyers
  - 10 of 98 Gearing-class
    - Gearing (DD-710) ... Hamner (DD-718)
    - Epperson (DD-719) – completed by Bath Iron Works
    - Castle (DD-720) – scrapped incomplete
    - Woodrow R. Thompson (DD-721) – scrapped incomplete
- 42 of 558 Landing Ship Medium: LSM-253 - LSM-294

== See also ==
- Chickasaw Shipyard Village Historic District – the site of a U.S. Steel shipbuilding yard in Chickasaw, Alabama, which was later owned by Gulf Shipbuilding Corporation, a subsidiary of Waterman Steamship Corporation during World War II.
