= Flying Cloud =

Flying Cloud may refer to:

- Flying Cloud (clipper), an 1851 clipper built by Donald McKay
- Flying Cloud (log canoe), a 1932 log canoe built by John B. Harrison
- Flying Cloud Airport, an airport in Eden Prairie, Minnesota
- REO Flying Cloud, a car produced by the REO Motor Car Company
- SS Flying Cloud, either of two type C2 ships built for the United States Maritime Commission
- WS-124A Flying Cloud, a Cold War balloon bomb project of the United States Air Force

== See also ==
- All Sail Set: A Romance of the Flying Cloud, a children's book by Armstrong Sperry
