= USS Spokane =

Juneau-class light cruiser

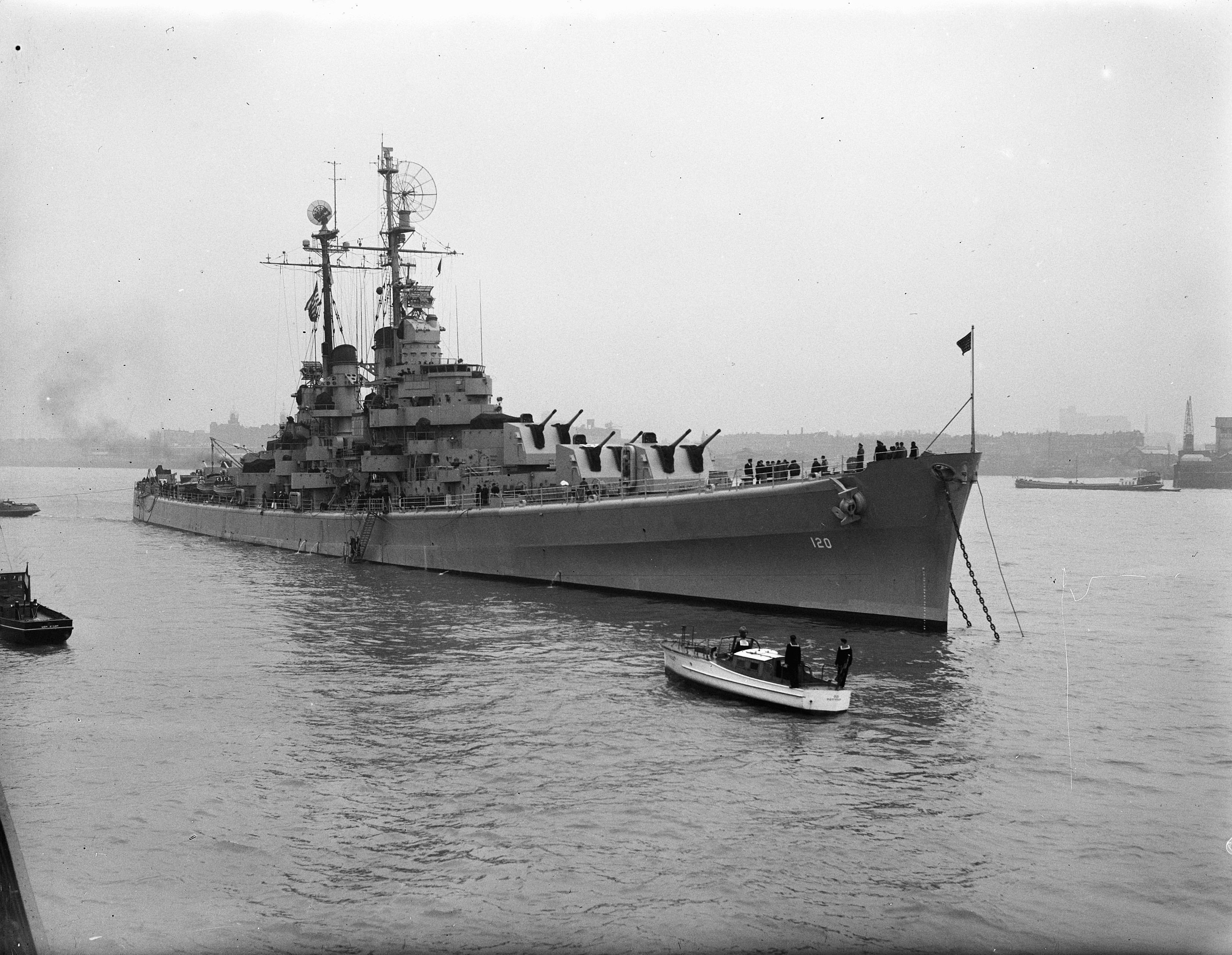
- USS Spokane in Rotterdam on 12 February 1948

History

United States
- Name: Spokane
- Namesake: City of Spokane, Washington
- Builder: Federal Shipbuilding and Drydock Company
- Laid down: 15 November 1944
- Launched: 22 September 1945
- Sponsored by: Mrs Patrice Munsel
- Commissioned: 17 May 1946
- Decommissioned: 27 February 1950
- Reclassified: CLAA-120, 18 March 1949; AG-191, 1 April 1966
- Stricken: 15 April 1972
- Identification: Hull symbol:CL-120; Callsign:NTDU
- Honors and awards: See Awards
- Fate: Scrapped, 17 May 1973

General characteristics (as built)
- Class & type: Juneau-class light cruiser
- Displacement: 6,500 tons (standard); 8,450 tons (loaded)
- Length: 541 ft 0 in (164.9 m)
- Beam: 52 ft 10 in (16.1 m)
- Draft: 20 ft 6 in (6.2 m)
- Propulsion: 4 × 665 psi boilers; 2 geared steam turbines; 78,749 hp (58.723 MW)
- Speed: 32.7 knots (61 km/h)
- Range: 6,440 nautical miles (11,930 km) at 20 knots (37 km/h)
- Boats & landing craft carried: 2 × lifeboats
- Complement: Officer: 47; Enlisted: 695
- Sensors & processing systems: Early: SC-2 air-search radar; SK-2 air-search radar; SG-1 surface-search radar; Later: AN/SPS-6 air-search radar; SR-3 surface-search radar; SP fighter-direction radar
- Armament: 6 × dual 5"/38 caliber guns; 6 × quad Bofors 40 mm guns; 4 × dual Bofors 40 mm guns; 8 × dual Oerlikon 20 mm cannons; Juneau: 6 × dual 5"/38 caliber guns; 7 × dual 3"/50 caliber guns
- Armor: Belt: 1.1–3 3/4 in (28–95 mm); Deck: 1 1/4 in (32 mm); Turrets: 1 1/4 in (32 mm); Conning Tower: 2 1/2 in (64 mm)

USS Spokane (CL-120/CLAA-120/AG-191) was the second ship of the Juneau-class light cruiser of the United States Navy.

== Construction and career ==
She was laid down on 15 November 1944 at the Federal Shipbuilding and Drydock Company in Kearny, New Jersey; launched on 22 September 1945, sponsored by Miss Patrice Munsel; and commissioned on 17 May 1946.

Spokane shifted to Bayonne, New Jersey, and then to Brooklyn, New York, where she sailed on 24 June for Guantánamo Bay, Cuba, for her shakedown cruise and to conduct battle practice and weapons firing. She returned to New York on 11 September. The cruiser was assigned to the 2nd Fleet for duty in European waters, and sailed for Plymouth, England, on 7 October.

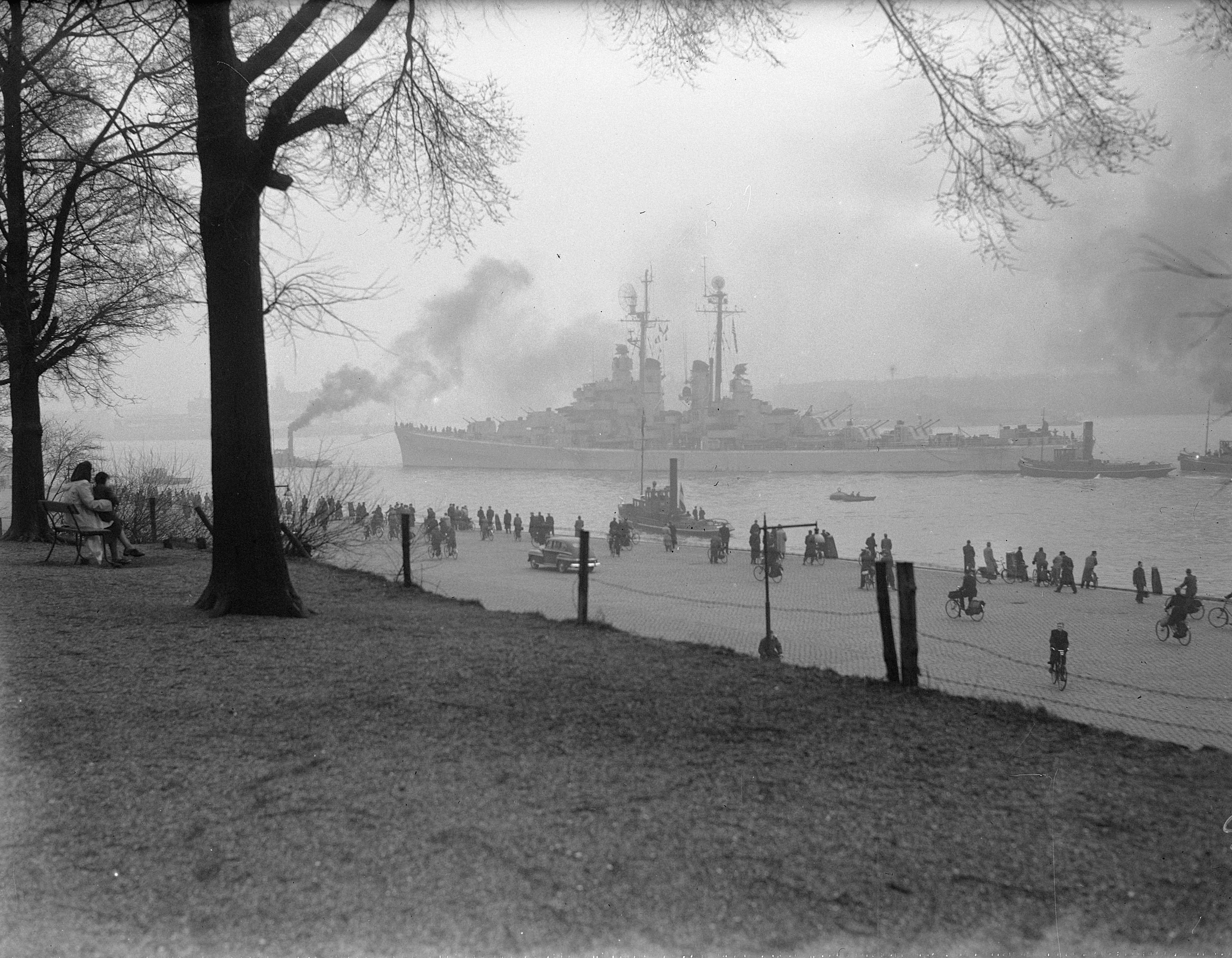
USS Spokane in Rotterdam

Spokane operated out of British ports until mid-January 1947. During her tour, she visited Scotland, Ireland, Norway, and Denmark. On 27 January, she stood out of Plymouth and proceeded to the United States via Portugal, Gibraltar, and Guantánamo Bay, where she participated in fleet exercises before arriving at Norfolk, Virginia, on 18 March. Following fleet and bombardment exercises in the Chesapeake Bay during the summer, she had a period of yard availability at the Brooklyn Navy Yard from 22 September to 14 October. The cruiser returned to Norfolk for Navy Day, 27 October, and then prepared for another deployment.

Spokane stood out of Norfolk on 29 October, and rendezvoused with other units of the 2nd Task Fleet for tactical exercises off Bermuda until 8 November, when she sailed for England. She arrived at Plymouth on 16 November, and was assigned to duty with Naval Forces, Eastern Atlantic and Mediterranean. Four days later, the ship donned "full dress" in celebration of the marriage of Her Royal Highness, Princess Elizabeth of England. The cruiser visited Bremerhaven, Germany from 24 to 26 November, and returned to England for tactical operations. In February 1948, the ship called at Rotterdam, Netherlands, where she was visited by his Royal Highness Prince Bernhard on 17 February. On 1 March, Spokane stood out of Plymouth en route to the east coast, and arrived at Norfolk on 11 March. On 18 March, her designation was changed to CLAA-120.

Spokane's operations along the eastern seaboard during the remainder of the year were broken by an overhaul at the New York Navy Yard from 27 May-15 September. On 4 January 1949, the ship sortied with Philippine Sea and Manchester for the Mediterranean. On 25 January, at Athens, the cruiser was paid a royal visit by King Paul and Queen Fredrika of Greece. Spokane participated in war games with 6th Fleet units, and visited ports in Turkey, Italy, France, Sardinia, Tunisia, Libya, and Algeria before returning to Norfolk on 23 May.

Spokane acted as a training ship for Naval Reserves of the 4th Naval District during the summer and then participated in training exercises in the Virginia Capes area.

=== Decommissioning ===
On 24 October 1949, Spokane sailed to New York for inactivation. She was placed in reserve, out of commission, on 27 February 1950, and berthed at New York. On 1 April 1966, she received the new hull number AG-191, to be used as a sonar test ship. Spokane was struck from the Naval Vessel Register on 15 April 1972. She was sold to Luria Brothers & Company, Inc., on 17 May 1973 and scrapped.

== Awards ==
- World War II Victory Medal
- Navy Occupation Medal with (Europe clasp)
