= Vandalia =

Vandalia was a plan by British investors in 1770 to occupy 2,500,000 acres of land and create a new colony in the Ohio Valley in North America.

== Places ==
=== United States ===
- Vandalia, Illinois
- Vandalia, Indiana
- Vandalia, Michigan
- Vandalia, Missouri
- Vandalia, Montana
- Vandalia, Ohio
- Vandalia, West Virginia

=== Elsewhere ===
- A poetic name for Andalusia, since it was ruled by the Vandals
- An imaginary place in Don Quixote

== Other ==
- USS Vandalia, four ships in the United States Navy
- Vandalia Gathering, an annual festival in Charleston, West Virginia, United States

== See also ==
- Vandal Kingdom, established by the Germanic Vandal people
- Vandalia Railroad (disambiguation)
