= Juneau-class cruiser =

WWII-era U.S. Navy light cruiser class

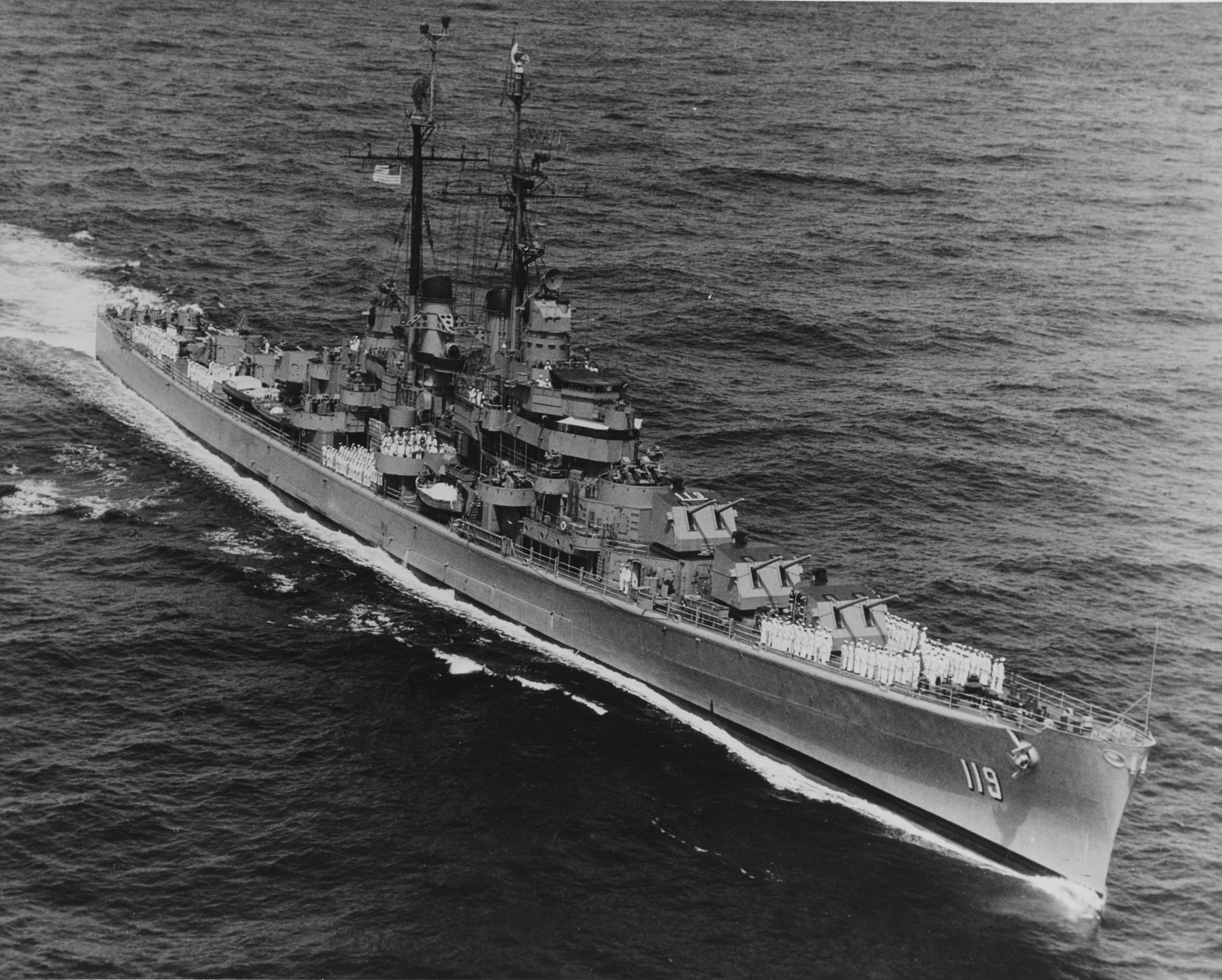
- USS Juneau on 1 July 1951

Class overview
- Name: Juneau class
- Builders: Federal Shipbuilding and Drydock Company
- Operators: United States Navy
- Preceded by: Atlanta class
- Succeeded by: CL-154 class (not built)
- Built: 1944–1946
- In commission: 1946–1955
- Completed: 3
- Retired: 3

General characteristics
- Class & type: Light cruiser
- Displacement: 6,500 tons (standard); 8,450 tons (loaded)
- Length: 541 ft 0 in (164.9 m)
- Beam: 52 ft 10 in (16.1 m)
- Draft: 20 ft 6 in (6.2 m)
- Propulsion: 4 × 665 psi (4,590 kPa) boilers; 2 geared steam turbines; 78,749 hp (58,723 kW)
- Speed: 32.7 knots (60.6 km/h; 37.6 mph)
- Range: 6,440 nmi (11,930 km; 7,410 mi) at 20 knots (37 km/h; 23 mph)
- Boats & landing craft carried: 2 × lifeboats
- Complement: 742
- Sensors & processing systems: Early: SC-2 air-search radar; SK-2 air-search radar (Fresno and Spokane); SG-1 surface-search radar; Later: AN/SPS-6 air-search radar; SR-3 surface-search radar; SP fighter-direction radar; Mark 56 fire-control system
- Armament: 6 × dual 5"/38 caliber guns; 6 × quad Bofors 40 mm guns; 4 × dual Bofors 40 mm guns; 8 × dual Oerlikon 20 mm cannons; Juneau: 6 × dual 5"/38 caliber guns; 7 × dual 3"/50 caliber guns
- Armor: Belt: 1.1–3 3/4 in (28–95 mm); Deck: 1 1/4 in (32 mm); Turrets: 1 1/4 in (32 mm); Conning tower: 2 1/2 in (64 mm)

The Juneau-class cruisers were a class of United States Navy light cruisers that were modified versions of the Atlanta-class cruiser design. The ships had the same dual-purpose main armament as USS Oakland (herself a modified Atlanta class) with a much heavier secondary anti-aircraft battery, while the anti-submarine depth charge tracks and torpedo tubes were removed along with a redesigned superstructure to reduce weight and increase stability. Three ships were ordered and built, all completed shortly after World War II, but only Juneau remained active long enough to see action during the Korean War.

== Redesign ==
The Atlanta-class cruisers increased wartime complement and armament; and the loss of Atlanta and Juneau (here referring to the Juneau of the Atlanta class, not to be confused with the lead ship of the Juneau class) revealed weaknesses in their stability and hull integrity of the ships which was addressed in a 1942 redesign at the same time as the modified Cleveland-class cruiser, the Fargo-class cruiser. The ships had the same main armament as Oakland, but the bridge and superstructure were redesigned to remove weight and increase visibility, and the reduction in weight allowed increased antiaircraft guns to be added; however, the weight of this additional armament negated the redesign's weight saving and stability goals even prior to launch. Watertight integrity was improved by removing doors on the lowest decks of the ship between bulkheads. In addition, all the anti-submarine armament was removed, along with the torpedo battery.

== Specifications ==
The main gun battery of the Juneau class was composed of six dual 5-inch/38 caliber (127 mm) gun mounts (twelve 5-inch guns). The class was designed with a secondary anti-aircraft armament of thirty-two 40 mm anti-aircraft guns, and sixteen 20 mm rapid-fire anti-aircraft cannon with high-explosive shells. After the war, the ships were planned under project SCB 74D to convert to a 3 in (76 mm) secondary armament to replace the 40 mm guns, but only Juneau was converted.

The class was powered by the same equipment as the Atlanta class: four 665 psi (4,590 kPa) boilers, connected to two geared steam turbines producing 75,000 hp (56 MW), and the ships could maintain a top speed of 33.6 knots (62 km/h). On trial Juneau made 32.48 knots (60 km/h) at 78,985 shaft horsepower (58,899 kW). The ships of the Juneau class had the same armor as the Atlanta class: a maximum of 3.75 in (95.3 mm) on their sides, with the 5-inch gun mounts being protected by 1.25 in (31.8 mm) and the conning tower by 2.5 inches (64 mm). The ships were originally designed for 47 officers and 695 men.

== Service history ==
Three ships were built and none of the ships served during World War II; the lead ship of this class, Juneau (CL-119) which was named after the war loss Juneau (CL-52), was launched on 15 July 1945 and commissioned on 15 February 1946. Spokane was launched on 22 September 1945, and commissioned on 17 May 1946. Fresno was launched on 5 March 1946 and commissioned on 27 November 1946.

Spokane and Fresno were decommissioned in 1949 and 1950 prior to the start of the Korean War, but Juneau, at this point redesignated as an anti-aircraft cruiser CLAA-119, participated in the conflict. On 2 July 1950, Juneau, along with HMS Jamaica, and HMS Black Swan were attacked by four torpedo boats and two motor gunboats of the North Korean Navy, and the combined firepower of the Anglo-American ships sank three enemy torpedo boats and both gunboats near Chumonchin Chan. She was decommissioned in 1955, shortly after the war ended. All three ships were considered for refitting as guided missile cruisers or ASW ships but ultimately were sold for scrap in the 1960s.

== Ships in class ==
Ship name	Hull No.	Builder	Laid down	Launched	Commissioned	Decommissioned	Fate
Juneau	CL-119	Federal Shipbuilding and Drydock Company, Kearny, New Jersey	15 September 1944	15 July 1945	15 February 1946	23 July 1955	Struck 1 November 1959; Sold for scrap on 29 April 1960 to Union Metals & Alloys Corp., New York, New York
Spokane	CL-120	Federal Shipbuilding and Drydock Company, Kearny, New Jersey	15 November 1944	22 September 1945	17 May 1946	27 February 1950	Struck 15 April 1972; Sold for scrap on 17 May 1973
Fresno	CL-121	Federal Shipbuilding and Drydock Company, Kearny, New Jersey	12 February 1945	5 March 1946	27 November 1946	17 May 1949	Struck April 1965; Sold for scrap on 17 June 1966

== See also ==
- List of cruisers of the United States Navy
