= USS Juneau (CL-119) =

Light cruiser of the United States Navy

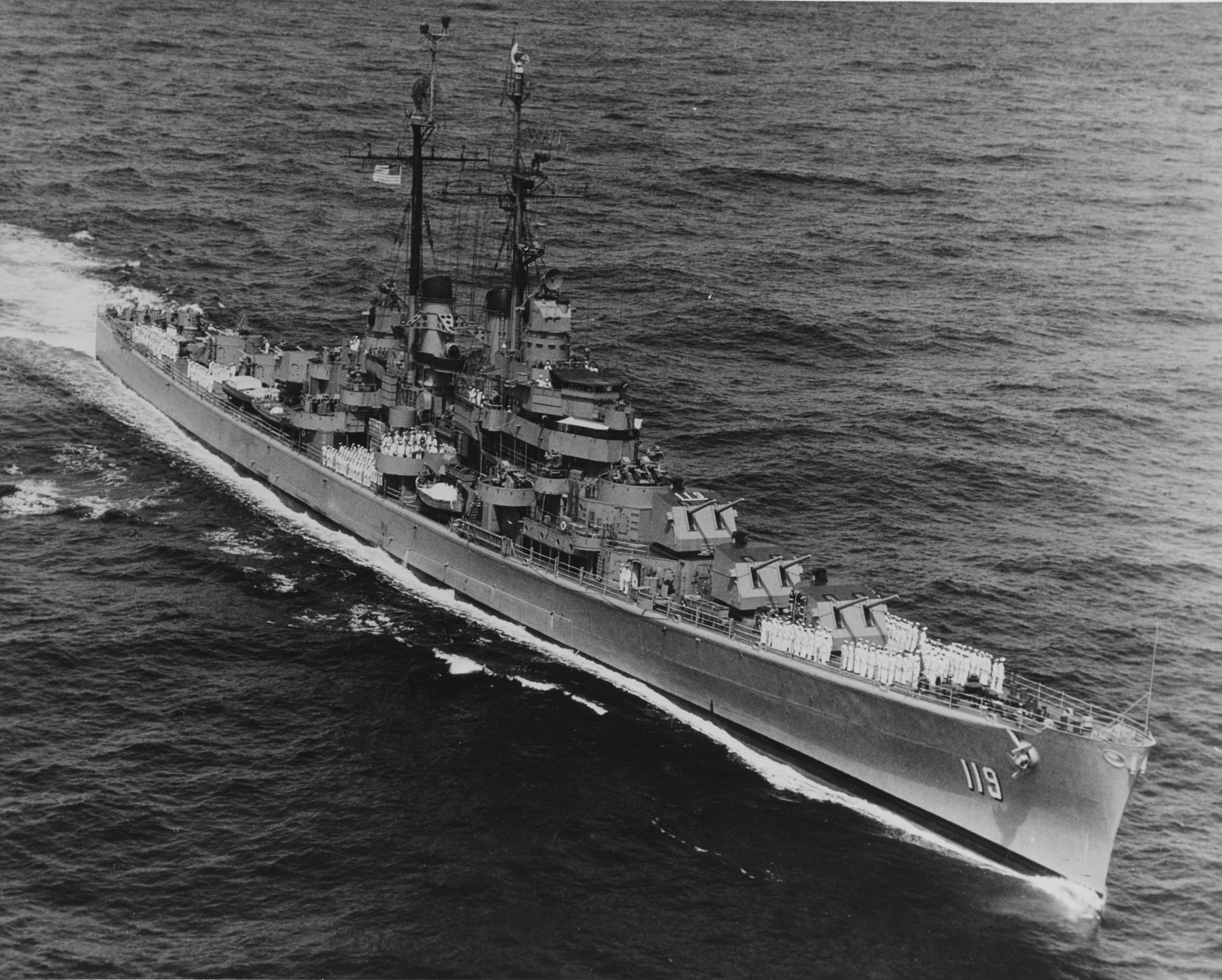
- USS Juneau underway on 1 July 1951

History

United States
- Name: Juneau
- Namesake: City of Juneau, Alaska
- Builder: Federal Shipbuilding and Drydock Company
- Laid down: 15 September 1944
- Launched: 15 July 1945
- Sponsored by: Mrs. B. L. Bartlett
- Commissioned: 15 February 1946
- Decommissioned: 23 July 1955
- Reclassified: CLAA-119, 18 March 1949
- Stricken: 1 November 1959
- Identification: Hull number: CL-119; Callsign:NTLP
- Nickname(s): The Galloping Ghost
- Honors and awards: See Awards
- Fate: Scrapped, 29 April 1960

General characteristics (as built)
- Class & type: Juneau-class light cruiser
- Displacement: 6,500 tons (standard); 8,450 tons (loaded)
- Length: 541 ft 0 in (164.9 m)
- Beam: 52 ft 10 in (16.1 m)
- Draft: 20 ft 6 in (6.2 m)
- Propulsion: 4 × 665 psi boilers; 2 geared steam turbines; 78,749 hp (58.723 MW)
- Speed: 32.7 knots (61 km/h)
- Range: 6,440 nautical miles (11,930 km) at 20 knots (37 km/h)
- Boats & landing craft carried: 2 × lifeboats
- Complement: Officer: 47; Enlisted: 695
- Sensors & processing systems: Early: SC-2 air-search radar; SG-1 surface-search radar; Later: AN/SPS-6 air-search radar; SR-3 surface-search radar; SP fighter-direction radar
- Armament: As built: 6 dual 5"/38 caliber guns; 6 quad and 4 dual Bofors 40 mm guns; 8 dual Oerlikon 20 mm cannons; 1952 Configuration: 6 dual 5"/38 caliber guns; 6 dual and 2 single 3"/50 caliber guns
- Armor: Belt: 1.1–3 3/4 in (28–95 mm); Deck: 1 1/4 in (32 mm); Turrets: 1 1/4 in (32 mm); Conning Tower: 2 1/2 in (64 mm)

The second USS Juneau (CL-119/CLAA-119) was the lead ship of the United States Navy Juneau-class cruisers.

== Construction and commissioning ==
Juneau was laid down by the Federal Shipbuilding and Drydock Company in Kearny, New Jersey, on 15 September 1944; launched on 15 July 1945; sponsored by Mrs. B. L. Bartlett; and commissioned 15 February 1946.

== Service history ==
=== Mediterranean, 1946-1949 ===
Juneau spent her first year of commissioned service in operations along the Atlantic seaboard and Caribbean. Prior to the Korean War, she deployed three times in the Mediterranean. The ship cleared New York on 16 April 1947, and joined the 6th Fleet at Trieste on 2 May where she aided in stabilizing the unresolved question of territorial ownership between Italy and Yugoslavia. During an extended tour of Greece, she provided ample warning to the communists that aggression would not go unchallenged. The ship returned to Norfolk on 15 November for training, and was back on duty with the 6th Fleet from 14 June-3 October 1948 and again from 3 May-26 September 1949. As on her first cruise, she ranged the Mediterranean to assure Europeans and Africans of the USA's intention to guard world peace and freedom.

Having been reclassified CLAA-119 on 18 March 1949, Juneau departed Norfolk on 29 November for the Pacific.

=== Korean War, 1950-1952 ===
She arrived at Bremerton, Washington, on 15 January 1950 and took part in operations along the Pacific coast. On 22 April, she became flagship for Rear Admiral J. M. Higgins, Commander Cruiser Division 5 (CruDiv 5), and reported for duty in Yokosuka, Japan on 1 June, where she began surveillance patrols in the Tsushima Straits. When the Korean War broke out on 25 June, Juneau was one of the few ships immediately available to Vice Admiral C. Turner Joy, Commander of Naval Forces, Far East. She patrolled south of the 38th parallel to prevent enemy landings, conducted the first shore bombardments on 29 June at Bokuko Ko, destroyed enemy shore installations, engaged in the first naval action on 2 July when she sank three enemy torpedo boats near Chumonchin Chan, and supported raiding parties along the coast. On 18 July, Juneau's force, which included British units such as the Royal Navy light cruiser HMS Belfast, laid down a deadly barrage on enemy troop concentrations near Yongdok which slowed down the North Korean advance southward.

The ship departed Sasebo Harbor on 28 July and made a sweep through the Formosa Straits before reporting for duty with the 7th Fleet at Buckner Bay, Okinawa, on 2 August. She became flagship of the Formosa Patrol Force on 4 August, remaining until 29 October when she joined the Fast Carrier Task Force operating off the east coast of Korea. The ship conducted daily plane guard for the attack carriers, and returned to Long Beach, California, on 1 May 1951 for overhaul. In nine months she was updated with improved Mk 37, 56 and 63 fire control and an improved armament of 14 3-inch/50cal (6x2 & 2x1) and 12 5-inch (6x2). Underway on Jan 26 1952 and a period of operations off the Pacific coast and in Hawaii. She returned to Yokosuka on 19 April 1952 and conducted strikes along the Korean coast in coordination with carrier planes until returning to Long Beach on 5 November.

=== Atlantic, 1953-1955 ===
Juneau engaged in training maneuvers and operations until 7 April 1953 when she arrived Norfolk to rejoin the Atlantic Fleet. On 13 May the cruiser departed for duty with the 6th Fleet once again, and returned home on 23 October. She operated in the Atlantic and Caribbean until 18 November 1954, then returned to the Mediterranean for her last tour of duty.

== Decommissioning and sale ==
After her return to the East Coast on 23 February 1955, she was placed in reserve at Philadelphia on 23 March 1955, and remained inactive until decommissioned on 23 July 1955. The ship was then attached to the Philadelphia Group of the Atlantic Reserve Fleet until 1 November 1959, when she was struck from the Naval Vessel Register. Juneau was sold for scrapping to the Union Minerals and Alloys Corporation, New York in 1962.

== Awards ==
- World War II Victory Medal
- Navy Occupation Medal
- National Defense Service Medal
- Korean Service Medal with five battle stars
- United Nations Korea Medal
