= USS Fresno (CL-121) =

Juneau-class light cruiser

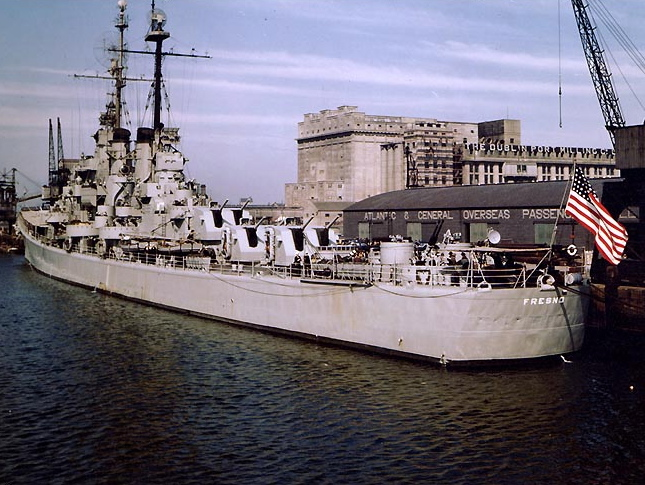
- USS Fresno (CL-121), at Dublin, Ireland, May 1948.

History

United States
- Name: Fresno
- Namesake: City of Fresno, California
- Builder: Federal Shipbuilding and Drydock Company, Kearny, New Jersey
- Laid down: 12 February 1945
- Launched: 5 March 1946
- Sponsored by: Mrs. Ruth R. Martin
- Commissioned: 27 November 1946
- Decommissioned: 17 May 1949
- Reclassified: CLAA-121, 18 March 1949
- Stricken: April 1965
- Identification: Hull symbol:CL-121; Hull symbol:CLAA-121; Code letters:NKEL
- Fate: Sold for scrap on 17 June 1966

General characteristics (as built)
- Class & type: Juneau-class light cruiser
- Displacement: 6,718 long tons (6,826 t) (standard); 8,340 long tons (8,470 t) (max)
- Length: 541 ft 6 in (165.05 m) oa
- Beam: 53 ft (16 m)
- Draft: 20 ft 6 in (6.25 m) (mean); 26 ft 6 in (8.08 m) (max)
- Installed power: 4 × Steam boilers; 75,000 shp (56,000 kW)
- Propulsion: 2 × geared turbines; 2 × screws
- Speed: 32.5 kn (37.4 mph; 60.2 km/h)
- Complement: 623 officers and enlisted
- Armament: 12 × 5 in (127 mm)/38 caliber Mark 12 guns (6×2); 6 × quad 40 mm (1.6 in) Bofors anti-aircraft guns; 6 × dual 40 mm (1.6 in) Bofors anti-aircraft guns; 8 × dual 20 mm (0.79 in) Oerlikon anti-aircraft cannons; 8 × 21 in (533 mm) torpedo tubes; 6 × depth charge projectors; 2 × depth charge tracks
- Armor: Belt: 1.1–3 3/4 in (28–95 mm); Deck: 1 1/4 in (32 mm); Turrets: 1 1/4 in (32 mm); Conning Tower: 2 1/2 in (64 mm)

General characteristics (post-war)
- Armament: 12 × 5 in (127 mm)/38 caliber Mark 12 guns (6×2); 4 × quad 40 mm (1.6 in) Bofors anti-aircraft guns; 4 × dual 40 mm (1.6 in) Bofors anti-aircraft guns

The second USS Fresno (CL-121) was a United States Navy Juneau-class light cruiser launched on 5 March 1946 by Federal Shipbuilding and Dry Dock Company of Kearny, New Jersey, sponsored by Mrs. Ruth R. Martin; and commissioned on 27 November 1946, with Captain Elliott Bowman Strauss in command. She was reclassified CLAA-121 on 18 March 1949.

== Service history ==
During her first operational cruise, from 13 January-7 May 1947, Fresno not only concluded her preliminary training in the Caribbean, but also visited Montevideo, Uruguay, during a presidential inauguration and called at Rio de Janeiro. On 1 August, she sailed from Norfolk, Virginia for a tour of duty which took her to ports both of northern Europe and the Mediterranean, returning to Norfolk on 1 December.

A second overseas deployment, from 3 March-19 June 1948, found Fresno visiting Amsterdam, Dublin, Bergen, and Copenhagen from her overseas base at Plymouth, England. Her coastwise operations from Norfolk included cruises to Prince Edward Island and Bermuda prior to her decommissioning at New York Naval Shipyard on 17 May 1949. Placed in reserve, she was berthed at Bayonne, New Jersey. She was sold for scrap on 17 June 1966.

== Awards ==
- World War II Victory Medal
- Navy Occupation Medal with "EUROPE" clasp
