= SS Mormacyork =

SS or MS Mormacyork may refer to one of two Type C3 ships built for the United States Maritime Commission on behalf of Moore-McCormack Lines:

- SS Mormacyork (1939) (MC hull number 43), built by Federal Shipbuilding; transferred to the United States Navy as submarine tender USS Pelias (AS-14) in 1940; scrapped 1973
- MS Mormacyork (1940) (MC hull number 45), built by Sun Shipbuilding; transferred to the United States Navy as transport USS Anne Arundel (AP-76) in 1942; scrapped 1970
