= SS Sea Panther =

SS Sea Panther may refer to one of several Type C3 ships built for the United States Maritime Commission:

- SS Sea Panther (1940) (MC hull number 40, Type C3), built by Federal Shipbuilding; operated as SS Doctor Lykes for Lykes Brothers; acquired by the United States Navy for use as cargo ship USS Hamul (AK-30) in June 1941; converted to destroyer tender, AD-21, January 1943; placed in National Defense Reserve Fleet in September 1962; scrapped October 1975
- SS Sea Panther (1943) (MC hull number 390, Type C3-S-A2), built by Ingalls Shipbuilding; acquired by the United States Navy and converted to Bayfield-class attack transport USS Elmore (APA-42); sold for commercial service in 1948; scrapped in 1971
