= USS Vandalia (IX-191) =

Steel-hulled tanker of the US Navy in service 1944-1945

History

United States
- Name: Vandalia
- Namesake: Three cities in the US
- Owner: Standard Oil
- Builder: Federal Shipbuilding and Drydock Company
- Launched: 9 February 1921
- Completed: 1921 as Walter Jennings
- Commissioned: 23 December 1944
- Decommissioned: 20 November 1945
- Stricken: 5 December 1945
- Fate: Wrecked by typhoon 9 October 1945. Sold for scrap 31 December.

General characteristics
- Type: Tanker
- Displacement: 22,491 tons
- Length: 516 feet 6 inches
- Beam: 68 feet 1-inch
- Draught: 28 feet 8 inches
- Speed: 10 knots
- Complement: 105 officers and men
- Armament: One 4 in (100 mm) gun; One 3 in (76 mm) gun

USS Vandalia (IX-191), a twin-screw, steel-hulled tanker, was the third ship of the United States Navy to be named for Vandalia, the name of three cities in the United States that is also used poetically for various regions.

As Walter Jennings, her construction was completed in 1921 by the Federal Shipbuilding Company of Newark, New Jersey, for the Standard Oil Company of New Jersey and she served under the aegis of Standard Oil through the 1920s and 1930s. Allocated to the Navy by the United States Maritime Commission's War Shipping Administration in late 1944, the ship was renamed Vandalia on 18 October 1944, being designated as unclassified miscellaneous vessel IX-191. She was accordingly taken over from the War Shipping Administration on 23 December 1944 and was commissioned on the same day at Pearl Harbor, Hawaii.

Vandalia departed Pearl Harbor on 27 February 1945 for Eniwetok in the Marshall Islands and made port on 11 March. Routed to Saipan with a Mariana Islands-bound convoy, Vandalia developed an engine casualty and was forced to reverse course and turn back to Eniwetok for repairs. The vessel got underway on 18 March but was rerouted on 23 March to Ulithi in the Carolina Islands. Entering the harbor at her destination two days later, she proceeded to her assigned berth, remaining there into the summer as station tanker at Ulithi.

She subsequently shifted to Buckner Bay, Okinawa, to serve as storage tanker there in September. On 9 October, a particularly heavy and violent typhoon swept over Okinawa. Vandalia ran aground at 1518, coming to rest about 200 yards (180 m) from Miyegusuku Lighthouse on Naha Island and sinking rapidly. The 140-knot (260 km/h) winds lashed the ship, and heavy seas pounded the old tanker unmercifully. One engine failed, and the ship went out of control, carried along with the fury of the typhoon, as the ship's force determinedly tried to pump out the engine room, fire room, and after compartments. She came to rest listing to starboard, and the danger immediately confronting the commanding officer, Lieutenant John F. Auge, USNR, was that of the ship capsizing. Accordingly, Auge gave the order to abandon ship, which was done by 0740 on 10 October. There were no casualties.

Seaman Kermit S. Heistad of White Lake, Wisconsin, served as a gunner aboard the Vandalia in the months before the ship ran aground and nearly capsized in Buckner Bay. Heistad and two other unidentified shipmates were largely responsible for saving the lives of the crew and officers. On 12 October 1945, Seaman Heistad wrote an eye-witness account of the successful rescue in a letter to his sister, Rachel Heistad, also of Wisconsin:

"We hit the rocks Monday at 3:30 pm," Seaman Heistad wrote. "The wind was blowing at 144 miles per hour. We landed by two smaller ships which had 47 men on them and we took them on our ship by lines. Many of us were washed over board. Sometimes the waves would wash us back on and some times others would throw us a line and save us. Everyone was there two (sic) save the other fellow, forgetting about themselves. I've never heard of greater Heroism. There was not one man lost from our ship or the other two. Our crew as a whole was recommended for a citation.

"Almost 5:30 pm our ship drifted off the rocks and began to sink. At 7:30 the water was getting to (sic) high to stay on the stern. So we all went forward to the bridge carrying the wounded in stretchers (sic). We stayed in the bridge until 6:00 am Wednesday morning. We knew that the ship couldn't last my (sic) longer. Most of the ship was under water and it was turning over. We had the small boat that I and 2 other fellows used to run and so we asked the captain if we could try and get some of the men ashore. He said it was useless, but we could try. So we lowered the boat and got the wounded men in first and started for shore. The captain said if we got ashore we would never get back to get the rest of the men. I prayed every inch of the way back.

"There was black oil all over the water and I was covered with it," Seaman Heistad wrote. "It got in my eyes so I could hardly see and in my mouth and choked me. But we made it back to the ship. God did it all. We went back and forth 7 times to save the crew. We knew we wouldn't make it back every time, but we did. God has all the glory. The officers and captain waited until the last trip and the ship had nearly disappeared when we got ashore. All the men just about tore us apart they were so happy. Everyone was crying. I was covered with oil all over and they wiped me off with their handkerchiefs. Several of them came with their billfolds and tried to give them to us. All I could say was thank God.

"All during the night on the ship there were many things going on," Seaman Heistad wrote in his letter. "Many of them will never be mentioned. All the men were praying. None of us thought we would get threw (sic) alive. The strain was too much for some. They wanted to jump over the side. We had all we could do to keep the men together. We used a table for cleaning and sewing up wounds. Some of the men were awfully badly wounded. One had an awful tear and bruise on his leg. Another had his nose torn all loose and he was cut all over. There were 5 or 6 that were hurt very badly. I can never forget the cries of pain as they were treated and the cries of men as they were washed over the side. I just can't write what is in my heart. It can't be put into words. When we think every man was saved from drownding (sic) surely it was God's mercy. Oh, how I thank him. The captain said he was recommending the 3 of us on the boat for a silver star. But the medals are small. If I do get it, it will be God's medal and not mine."

Neither Heistad, nor the two other unidentified seamen who aided in the rescue, received official Naval recognition for their actions. However, Heistad received hometown accolades for his part in saving the crew of the Vandalia. A memorial display featuring a copy of Heistad's original letter, photos of the Vandalia pre- and post-typhoon, an account of the Allied military gathering in Buckner Bay, and the impact of the storm was presented 11 November 2010, by Heistad's son, Torrey S. Heistad, to the White Lake, Wisconsin, Historical Society. The display now hangs in the White Lake community museum. Kermit Heistad was also featured in an article in the Antigo (Wisconsin) Daily Journal on 13 November 2010, and on television station WAOW in Wausau, Wisconsin on 26 December 2010.

Immediately after the typhoon, the Vandalia commander observed that the ship appeared to be damaged beyond economical repair but nonetheless stationed a guard on board to prevent pilferage. A guard was retained on board until 20 November when, after stripping her of whatever remained of value, Vandalia was decommissioned and abandoned.

Struck from the Naval Vessel Register on 5 December 1945, the tanker was eventually purchased by the China Merchants and Engineers, Inc., for scrap, on 31 December.
