= Vandalia Railroad =

Vandalia Railroad may refer to:

- Vandalia Railroad (1983), a shortline subsidiary of Pioneer Railcorp
- Vandalia Railroad (1905–1917), a subsidiary of the Pennsylvania Railroad

== See also ==
- Vandalia (disambiguation)
