= SS Sea Hound =

SS Sea Hound may refer to one of several Type C3 ships built for the United States Maritime Commission:

- SS Sea Hound (1940) (MC hull number 39, Type C3), built by Federal Shipbuilding; delivered April 1940, renamed Frederick Lykes, World War II as War Shipping Administration cargo ship allocated to Army March 1942, bareboat chartered to Army, USAT Frederick Lykes July 1943—February 1946, redelivered Lykes Brothers 1946, sold renamed Harbor Hills then Kings Point 1965, sold by U.S. Marshall 1970, scrapped Taiwan in 1971
- SS Sea Hound (1942) (MC hull number 389, Type C3-S-A2), built by Ingalls Shipbuilding; acquired by the United States Navy and converted to Bayfield-class attack transport USS DuPage (AP-86/APA-41); sold for commercial service in 1948; scrapped in 1973
