= USS Winston =

Cargo ship of the United States Navy

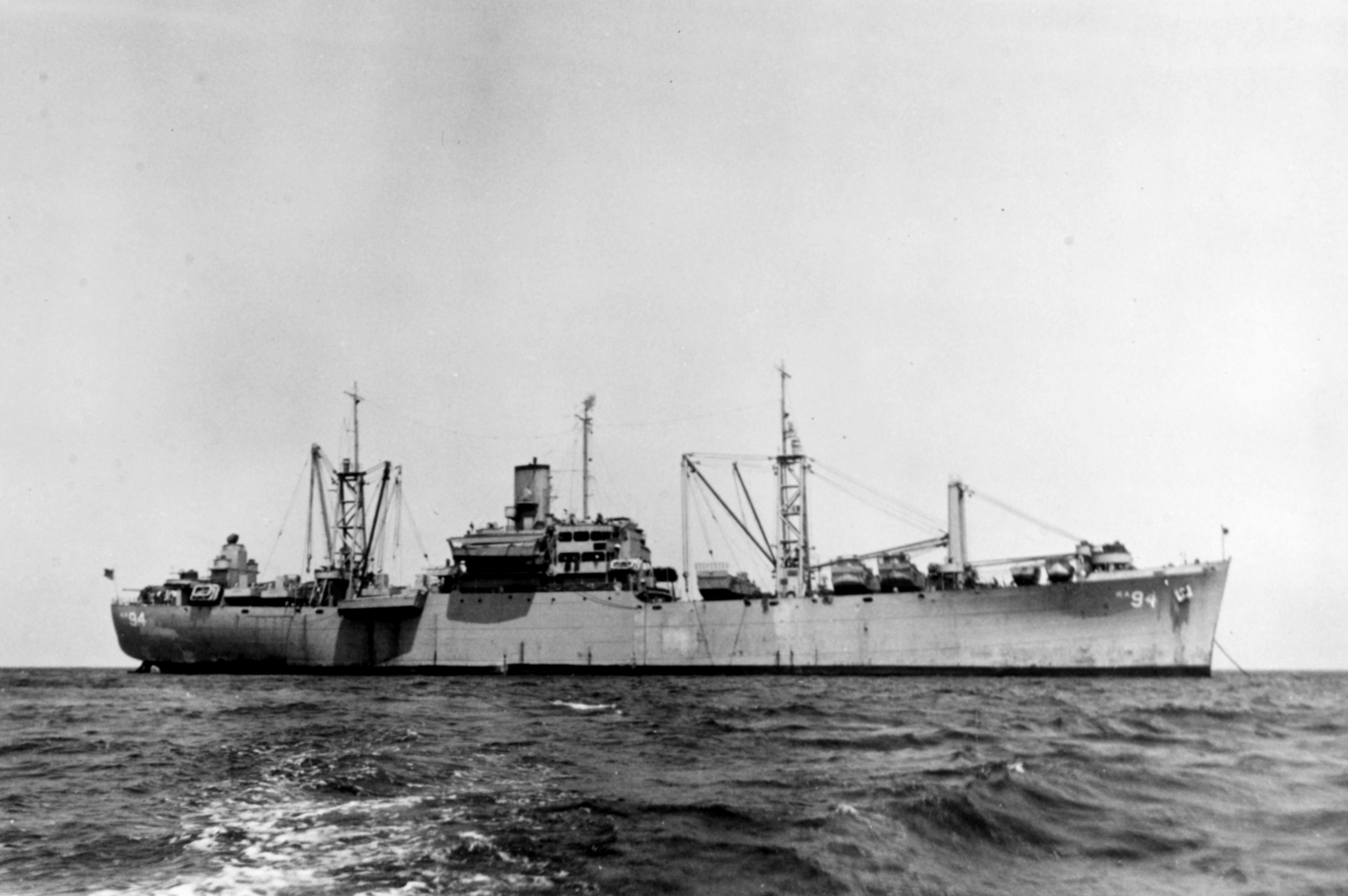

History

United States
- Name: USS Winston
- Namesake: Winston County, Alabama; Winston County, Mississippi
- Builder: Federal Shipbuilding and Drydock Company, Kearny, New Jersey
- Laid down: 10 July 1944
- Launched: 30 November 1944
- Acquired: 18 January 1945
- Commissioned: 19 January 1945
- Decommissioned: 1 February 1957
- Recommissioned: 24 November 1961
- Decommissioned: November 1969
- Reclassified: LKA-94, 1 January 1969
- Stricken: 1 September 1976
- Honours and awards: 7 battle stars (Korea); 7 battle stars (Vietnam)
- Fate: Sold for scrap, 15 November 1979

General characteristics
- Class & type: Andromeda-class attack cargo ship
- Type: Type C2-S-B1
- Displacement: 14,200 long tons (14,428 t) fully loaded
- Length: 459 ft 2 in (139.95 m)
- Beam: 63 ft (19 m)
- Draft: 26 ft 4 in (8.03 m)
- Speed: 16.5 knots (30.6 km/h; 19.0 mph)
- Complement: 247
- Armament: 1 × 5"/38 caliber gun mount; 4 × twin 40 mm gun mounts

USS Winston (AKA-94/LKA-94) was an Andromeda-class attack cargo ship in service with the United States Navy from 1945 to 1957 and from 1961 to 1969. She was scrapped in 1979.

== History ==
Winston (AKA-94) was named after counties in Alabama and Mississippi. She was laid down on 10 July 1944 at Kearny, New Jersey, by the Federal Shipbuilding and Drydock Company under a Maritime Commission contract (MC hull 216), launched on 30 November 1944, sponsored by Mrs. Benjamin Fairless, delivered to the Navy on 18 January 1945, and commissioned at the New York Navy Yard on 19 January 1945.

=== World War II, 1945 ===
Winston completed her fitting-out at New York and then departed on 3 February, bound for the Virginia Capes. She reached Hampton Roads the following day and, for the next nine days, conducted shakedown training in the Chesapeake Bay. Following post-shakedown availability at the Norfolk Navy Yard, she put to sea once again on 1 March, bound for Hawaii. En route, the vessel transited the Panama Canal on 7 March and arrived in Pearl Harbor on the 20th. After discharging her cargo, the attack cargo ship stood out of Pearl Harbor on 29 March, set a course for the west coast, and reached San Francisco on 4 April. There, Winston loaded 2,496 tons of cargo bound for the 4th Marine Division, headed back toward Hawaii on 10 April, and arrived at Maui nine days later. She discharged her cargo there and, on 27 April, received orders to conduct amphibious training at Kahoʻolawe Island. That operation lasted until 1 May. The following day, she stopped briefly at Honolulu before departing Hawaii on her way back to the west coast. She arrived in San Francisco Bay on 9 May, loaded ammunition at Port Chicago, and headed back to Hawaii on the 14th. In June and July, she made two more such round-trip voyages ferrying ammunition between Oʻahu and San Francisco. After her return to Pearl Harbor in August, Winston resumed duty with the amphibious forces. The war, however, ended before she saw any combat action.

=== Far East, Atlantic & Pacific deployments, 1945–1950 ===
Winston supported the American postwar occupation in Asia. On 7 September, she stood out of Pearl Harbor to transport the Army's 98th Infantry Division to Japan. She stopped at Saipan from the 19th to the 22nd and arrived at Wakayama, Japan, on 27 September. On 1 October, Winston got underway for the Philippines and, a week later, entered port at Manila. On the 8th, she moved to Subic Bay where she loaded landing craft to replace those she had left with the occupation forces in Japan. The following day, the ship left Subic Bay and headed – via Lingayen Gulf and Aringay – back to Japan. She reached Hiro Wan on 22 October and remained there for eight days. She put to sea again on the 30th and set a course for Pearl Harbor. Winston made a three-day stop at Oahu, from 10 to 13 November, before continuing on toward the United States. She transited the Panama Canal on 29 November and arrived at Norfolk, Virginia, on 7 December.

For almost two years, the ship plied the waters of the western Atlantic, participating in amphibious maneuvers with Marines from the Central American coast in the south to the shores of Greenland in the north. Late in 1947, Winston was inactivated briefly at Baltimore; but she returned to active service early in 1948. During that year, she resumed exercises with the Marines and travelled the length of the coast of North America. At the beginning of 1949, she embarked units of the 2nd Marine Division and sailed on 3 January for a four-month tour of duty in the Mediterranean. On 24 May, the attack cargo ship returned to the United States from her first cruise with the 6th Fleet. After disembarking the Marines at Morehead City, North Carolina, she proceeded to Norfolk and resumed east coast operations out of that port.

On 2 September, she left the Chesapeake Bay on her way to the Pacific Ocean. The ship transited the Panama Canal on the 7th, remained at Balboa until the 10th, and then headed north to the Pacific Northwest. She visited Olympia, Seattle, and Tacoma before moving south to San Diego on 29 September. Winston departed that port on 10 October, bound for Hawaii. For the next three weeks, she participated in Operation "Miki", a combined Army, Navy, Air Force, and Marine Corps exercise simulating a massive invasion of the Hawaiian Islands. She returned to the west coast in mid-November and paid visits to Tacoma, Washington, and San Francisco, California, before heading south toward Panama on 22 November. She entered the canal on 4 December, set a course back toward the Virginia Capes later that day, and arrived in Hampton Roads on 8 December. For the next seven months, Winston made training voyages out of Norfolk and conducted amphibious exercises with Marines embarked.

=== Korean War, 1950–1953 ===
However, the eruption of hostilities in the Far East late in June 1950 – when communist North Korea invaded South Korea – took the attack cargo ship back to the Orient. On 14 August, Winston stood out of Hampton Roads, bound – via the Panama Canal and the California coast – for the western Pacific. She transited the canal on the 19th and arrived in San Diego on the 27th. On 1 September, the ship embarked upon a non-stop voyage to Kobe, Japan, which she reached on the 16th. After two days at Kobe, Winston continued her voyage to the combat zone off the coast of Korea. On 26 September, she and the other units of Transport Division (TransDiv) 11 landed reinforcements at Inchon where, only 11 days before, the United States Navy had landed troops in a classic combined operation which forced communist forces to withdraw from much of South Korea. She continued participation in that operation for five days before retiring to Sasebo, Japan. Two weeks later, she returned to Inchon to reembark Marines for the landings at Wonsan carried out between 25 and 31 October. Completing her part in that operation, the attack cargo ship began a shuttle service between Pusan and the combat areas ferrying fresh troops and supplies – first to Wonsan and, later, to Hŭngnam.

Late in November, Chinese communist forces entered the conflict and began an all-out drive against United Nations forces to drive them out of North Korea. By early December, most UN troops were pushed across the 38th parallel into South Korea, but a few held coastal enclaves at Wonsan and Hŭngnam. Winston participated in the evacuation of troops from both areas. That operation occupied most of the final month of 1950. During the first eight months of 1951, the attack cargo ship continued her duty running troops and supplies between various points on the eastern coast of Korea. When UN forces began their push back northward, the naval forces along the eastern coast supported their advance by elaborate feints at amphibious landings far behind enemy lines. Winston participated in three of those diversions between April and June. Otherwise, her mission remained one of cargo and troop transportation.

After visits to Sasebo and Hong Kong in June and July, respectively, she departed Hong Kong on 14 July and shaped a course back to the United States. She arrived in San Diego on 1 August and began operations along the California coast. At the beginning of 1952, she left the coast for a voyage to Hawaii and an overhaul at the Pearl Harbor Naval Shipyard. At the conclusion of this refurbishing work, she resumed operations along the west coast out of San Diego.

In November, Winston loaded ammunition at San Francisco and, on the 12th, headed out to sea to return to the western Pacific. She arrived in Yokosuka, Japan, on the 29th; but, instead of heading back to the Korean coast immediately, the attack cargo ship made a circuit of port visits, stopping at Sasebo, Hong Kong, Subic Bay, and, returning to Japan, at Naha and Kobe before reentering Yokosuka. Between 12 and 14 February 1953, she made her first return visit to Korea, carrying troops and equipment from Japan to Pusan. From then until the armistice in July, shuttle missions between Japan and Korea remained her sole mission. Then, as the diplomatic offensive replaced military operations, the issue of prisoner exchange came to the fore, and Winston was chosen as one of the ships to participate in "Operation Big Switch". She made four trips between Koje-do, Cheju-do, and Pusan repatriating over 3,000 prisoners of war and civilian internees between August and September 1953.

=== Pacific Fleet, 1953–1957 ===
She returned to Japan early in September and, after stops at Sasebo and Yokosuka, the ship departed the latter port on 22 September to return to the United States. En route, she made a two-day layover at Pearl Harbor between 3 and 5 October and arrived in San Diego on the 12th. She remained there until 8 December, at which time she put to sea en route to Pearl Harbor and another shipyard overhaul.

After completing those repairs in February 1954, she headed home on the 24th and arrived at San Diego on 3 March. Six months of west coast operations under the auspices of the Commander, Amphibious Force, Pacific Fleet, ensued. In September, she headed back to the western Pacific once more for a five-month deployment during which she participated in 7th Fleet amphibious exercises and transported Marine Corps units between various bases in the Far East.

On 17 March 1955, Winston arrived back in San Diego to begin another six months with the Pacific Fleet Amphibious Force. Coastal operations, including participation in amphibious exercises at Camp Pendleton, occupied her through the summer. On 29 August, she stood out of San Diego on her way to the Far East once again. The ship entered Yokosuka on 15 September to begin an eventful tour of duty with the 7th Fleet.

She participated in Marine Corps landing exercises at Okinawa in November and, in February 1956, joined in another amphibious operation but this time at Iwo Jima. Late in February, she visited Yokosuka before heading home via Pearl Harbor. She reentered San Diego on 23 March and resumed local operations along the California coast. Those operations included a brief period of service in conjunction with the shooting of the film, The Good Shepherd. On 1 February 1957, Winston was placed out of commission, in reserve, apparently berthed at either San Diego or San Francisco. She also appeared in the movie "Away All Boats" which was released in 1958.

=== Recommissioned into the Pacific Fleet, 1961–1965 ===
After more than 45 months of inactivity, Winston was recommissioned at San Francisco on 24 November 1961. For the next year, she conducted operations in the eastern Pacific.

In late 1962, she began preparations for a deployment to the western Pacific. She stood out of San Diego on 16 October and stopped at Pearl Harbor at the beginning of November. There, she received orders to carry relief supplies to typhoon-stricken Guam which she did later that month. At Subic Bay for upkeep early in December, Winston began her first tour of duty with the 7th Fleet since recommissioning. That tour included a period of service as station ship at Hong Kong and missions training South Korean marines in amphibious operations at Pohang. She also carried an entire United States Marine Corps air group from Yokosuka to Kaohsiung, Taiwan. On 2 May 1963, the attack cargo ship ended her cruise back at San Diego; and she resumed local operations in the eastern Pacific. Amphibious training occupied her time during the summer, and an overhaul at Portland took care of late September, October, and November.

After post-overhaul training early in 1964, the ship voyaged to Hawaii to take part in amphibious exercises. She returned to the west coast in May and began preparations for another Far Eastern cruise. On 18 June, she stood out of San Diego bound, via Pearl Harbor, for the Orient. During her stop at Pearl Harbor, Winston and her boats took part in the shooting of Otto Preminger's film, In Harm's Way. By the time the ship arrived at Okinawa, the Gulf of Tonkin Incident had occurred and revised all 7th Fleet deployment plans. Thus, for the remainder of that tour of duty, Winston ranged the South China Sea conducting contingency patrols with combat-loaded Marine Corps units embarked, though her only South Vietnamese duty came as a result of a natural disaster rather than the civil war in that country. She supported relief efforts in the flood-soaked area around Da Nang. Near the end of the year, the ship pulled into San Diego to end her second western Pacific deployment since re-commissioning.

Winston spent the first five months of 1965 engaged in operations – amphibious exercises for the most part – along the coast of southern California. Late in May, she embarked Marines and their equipment for a brief deployment to the Far East. The ship stood out of San Diego on 24 May, made a three-day stop at Pearl Harbor along the way, and arrived in Buckner Bay, Okinawa, on 17 June. Between 21 and 28 June, she made a voyage from Buckner Bay to Sasebo, Japan, and back. During the latter part of the first week in July, Winston steamed from Okinawa to South Vietnam, arriving at Da Nang on the 7th. After a three-day layover, Winston put to sea, bound for Japan, and arrived at Yokosuka on the 19th where she remained for eight days. On the 27th, she sailed for the United States and, on 11 August, entered port at San Diego. Through the end of September, the ship went "cold iron" there for repairs but resumed operations out of her home port at the beginning of October. Amphibious exercises, independent ship's drills, and upkeep at San Diego occupied her during much of the winter of 1965 and 1966.

=== Vietnam War, 1966–1969 ===
During the latter half of February 1966, the ship prepared for another tour of duty in the western Pacific. Winston departed San Diego on 1 March 1966 for the first Far Eastern deployment in which she would conduct major operations in Vietnamese waters. She stopped at Pearl Harbor overnight on 10 and 11 March and arrived at Okinawa on the 26th. There, she unloaded one cargo and took on another – mostly lumber for construction activities at Chu Lai, South Vietnam. She arrived at Chu Lai on the 5th and spent the next four days unloading her cargo. On the 10th, she moved to Da Nang where she helped USS Skagit unload her cargo, and she herself loaded elements of the 4th Marines. The following day, she departed Da Nang for the Colo area near Huế, arriving there on the 12th. Between 13 and 15 April, her boats ferried ammunition and supplies up the Perfume River, both banks of which were in enemy hands.

At the completion of that dangerous mission, she reembarked all boats and crewmen and got underway for Hong Kong. Following a week of liberty, she returned to sea, set a course for Japan on 23 April, and arrived at Sasebo on the 27th. She spent three weeks in upkeep there before sailing on 16 May for Okinawa. She held amphibious training exercises in the Okinawa area on 17 and 18 May and, from 19 to 23 May, embarked Regimental Landing Team 5 and its equipment for transportation to Chu Lai. She set out for Vietnam on the 23rd and arrived at Chu Lai on the 27th. She unloaded cargo; disembarked passengers; and, after a brief stop at Da Nang on 2 June, got underway for Taiwan.

She arrived in Keelung on 4 June and remained there until the 7th when she returned to sea bound for Subic Bay in the Philippines. En route, however, she was rerouted to Yokosuka, Japan, where she arrived on 11 June. At the end of almost a month of upkeep at Yokosuka and several days of operations near Okinawa, Winston suffered damage to one of her boilers. That casualty forced her into Subic Bay for repairs, and she did not return to sea until 22 July.

On 26 July, after a rough transit which had taken her through the developing Typhoon "Ora", the ship returned to Vietnam at Cam Ranh Bay. The next day, she embarked men and equipment of the Army's 572rd Light Equipment Company for transportation north to Tuy Hòa. She anchored there the same day and began unloading. That operation lasted two days and proved difficult and hazardous due to the soft sand beach, large numbers of fishing craft and equipment crowding the area and large amounts of debris. On the 29th, she headed north from Tuy Hòa to evacuate a South Vietnamese unit from Qui Nhơn. That reverse amphibious operation saved the unit the heavy casualties it would have sustained fighting its way south along routes held by strong insurgent forces. Winston departed Qui Nhơn on 31 July and delivered the South Vietnamese troops to Tuy Hòa that same day. Over the next three days and nights, she completed another difficult unloading operation complicated by the proximity of the enemy and the possibility of hostile fishing craft. She departed the Vietnamese coast on 3 August and, after a stop at Okinawa, arrived at Yokosuka on the 11th. A week later, she headed home, stopped at Pearl Harbor from 27 to 29 August, arrived back in San Diego on 5 September, and resumed local operations along the southern California coast.

On 11 January 1967, Winston entered the Long Beach Naval Shipyard and began a three-month overhaul. She completed repairs on 27 April and spent the month of May engaged in refresher training. In June, she conducted amphibious exercises, and July brought preparations for her return to the western Pacific. The ship departed San Diego on 21 July and arrived in Pearl Harbor on the 29th. During the first week in August, she participated in another series of amphibious exercises conducted off Molokai. Two days after completing that training, she exited Pearl Harbor to resume her voyage west.

She arrived in Da Nang on 2 September and, after three days in port, returned to sea to join Amphibious Ready Group Alpha. During her six-week tour of duty with that mobile, self-contained amphibious unit, Winston participated in two combat operations. On 9 September, she helped backload marines of Special Landing Force (SLF) Alpha at Da Nang. On 16 September, she found herself off the Vietnamese coast near Hội An. During Operation Ballistic Charge, the Special Landing Force went ashore by both helicopters and surface assault craft. Winston's boats participated in the lift and in the backload operation a week later. Almost a month later, she again participated in an amphibious landing, Operation Bastion Hill, near Quảng Trị City. That operation ended on 20 October, and Winston served with ARG Alpha just eight more days before heading for Hong Kong and a liberty visit. From Hong Kong, she proceeded to Japan, arriving in Yokosuka on 17 November. After a brief upkeep, she began her homeward voyage on the 21st and entered San Diego on 10 December.

During the early months of 1968, Winston made preparations for another deployment to the western Pacific. She spent most of March in the shipyard at Treasure Island undergoing repairs. Late in April, she took part in Operation "Beagle Leash", an amphibious exercise which simulated an attack on the Marine Corps base at Camp Pendleton. Throughout the summer, the ship participated in various single-and multi-ship training exercises honing her amphibious landing skills in preparation for another combat cruise off the coast of Vietnam.

On 31 October, Winston stood out of San Diego and set course, via Pearl Harbor, for the Far East. She arrived at Okinawa on 24 November but departed the following day, bound for Vietnam. She arrived in Da Nang on 29 November, unloaded 300 tons of cargo, and set sail for Subic Bay that same day. The ship entered Subic Bay on 2 December and reported for duty with ARG Alpha. On the 9th, she put to sea to return to the coast of Vietnam. She arrived at Da Nang on the 11th and, for about a month, engaged in routine steaming with ARG Alpha.

On 1 January 1969, the ship was redesignated (LKA-94).

On 5 January, her troops went ashore in the I Corps combat zone for operations against Viet Cong forces in Operation Valiant Hunt. That action continued until 12 January but proved to be only a preliminary to Operation Bold Mariner which she joined on the 13th. Bold Mariner was purported to be the largest amphibious operation of the Vietnam War to that date, and Winston participated in it until 25 January. After a brief stop at Da Nang on the 26th to unload some cargo, the ship got underway for a liberty call at Singapore which lasted from 1 to 10 February. She arrived back at Da Nang four days later. The ship operated off the coast of Vietnam, periodically departing the area for port calls at various places, until May 1969. After a stop at Yokosuka, Japan, near the end of the month, she headed back to the United States. Winston arrived back in San Diego on 12 June.

=== Decommissioning and fate ===
There, she began preparations for inactivation. Winston was placed out of commission sometime in November 1969 and, on 17 February 1970, she was transferred to the temporary custody of the Maritime Administration for lay up with the National Defense Reserve Fleet at Suisun Bay, California Winston remained berthed at Suisun Bay until 1 September 1976 at which time her name was struck from the Navy List, and her transfer to the Maritime Administration was made permanent.

Winston was sold for scrap on 15 November 1979 to Apolina Limited, Hong Kong and removed from the Suisun Bay Reserve Fleet on 18 December 1979. Scrapping was performed by Keun Hwa Iron, Steel Works, and Enterprises Ltd of Taiwan, completed as of 23 April 1980.

== Awards ==
Winston earned seven battle stars during the Korean War and another seven battle stars for service during the Vietnam War.
