= USS Vandalia =

USS Vandalia has been the name of four ships in the service of the United States Navy. All of the ships are named after Vandalia, Illinois.

- USS Vandalia (1828), an 18-gun sloop-of-war
- USS Vandalia (1876), a screw sloop
- USS Vandalia (IX-191), originally known as Walter Jennings, a twin-screw, steel-hulled tanker, acquired by the Navy in 1944 and sank in a typhoon in 1945.
- USS Vandalia (PC-1175), a submarine chaser which served from 1943 until 1946.
