= SS Red Jacket =

A number of steamships were named Red Jacket.

- SS Red Jacket (1918), laid down as Red Jacket, launched as Quistconck
- SS Red Jacket (1919), laid down as Red Jacket, launched as Inspector

See also

- Red Jacket (clipper)
