= All Sail Set =

Children's novel by Amstrong Sperry

All Sail Set: A Romance of the Flying Cloud
- The front cover art for All Sail Set
- Author: Armstrong Sperry
- Country: United States
- Language: English
- Genre: Children's, Historical Fiction
- Publisher: Nonpareil Books
- Published: 1935
- Media type: Print (paperback)

All Sail Set: A Romance of the Flying Cloud is a children's novel written and illustrated by Armstrong Sperry. It was first published in 1935 and was a Newbery Honor recipient in 1936.

== Plot ==
The novel tells the story of Enoch Thatcher, a boy who sails on the maiden voyage of the legendary Flying Cloud, when the clipper set the record for sailing from New York to San Francisco around Cape Horn. It is notable for its accurate depiction of sailing ships, complemented by the detailed drawings.

== Reception ==
All Sail Set was a Newbery Honor recipient in 1936.

The Fort Worth Star Telegram called it "a magical book" with an "irresistible" romance.
