= Almeria Lykes =

Six ships operated by the Lykes Brothers Steamship Co have carried the name Almeria Lykes

- SS Almeria Lykes (1920), purchased 1922, sold 1940
- SS Almeria Lykes (1940), managed for USMC 1940–41, and again in 1942. Sunk during Operation Pedestal
- SS Almeria Lykes (1945), managed for USMC, scrapped 1971
- MV Almeria Lykes (1972), a Type C8 transferred to Military Sealift Command in 1986 and renamed USNS Cape May
- SS Almeria Lykes (1987), originally SS President McKinley
- MV Almeria Lykes (1996), chartered out as President Buchanan, off charter 1996 and renamed Almeria Lykes, renamed Lykes Navigator in 1998, sold 2005 to CP Ships and renamed CP Navigator, transferred to Hapag-Lloyd as the Oslo Express and eventually scrapped
