= Vandalia, West Virginia =

- Unincorporated community
- Location within the state of West Virginia Vandalia (the United States)
- Coordinates: 38°55′37″N 80°24′13″W
- Country: United States
- State: West Virginia
- County: Lewis
- Elevation: 1,086 ft (331 m)
- Time zone: UTC-5 (Eastern (EST))
  - Summer (DST): UTC-4 (EDT)
- GNIS feature ID: 1548624

Vandalia is an unincorporated community in Lewis County, West Virginia, United States.

== History ==
A post office called Vandalia was established in 1890, and remained in operation until 1907. The community derives its name from the Vandals, according to local history.
