= SS Flying Cloud =

SS Flying Cloud may refer to one of two Type C2 ships built for the United States Maritime Commission:

- MS Flying Cloud (1939) (MC hull number 17), a Type C2 diesel-powered ship built by Federal Shipbuilding; served as United States Navy cargo ship USS Jupiter (AK-43) during World War II; scrapped in 1971
- SS Flying Cloud (1944) (MC hull number 1197), a Type C2-S-B1 steam-powered ship built by Moore Dry Dock; scrapped 1972
