= Biological and Chemical Defence Review Committee =

Civilian body of military oversight

The Biological and Chemical Defence Review Committee, or BCDRC (French: Comité d'examen du programme de défense biologique et chimique, or CEPDBC), is a civilian body having oversight of the Canadian military's activities in the area of defence against biological and chemical warfare.

== History ==
The BCDRC was established more than 20 years ago in response to citizens' requests to be informed about the activities of the Canadian military involving chemical and biological armaments, particularly but not exclusively those at CFB Suffield.

CFB Suffield, an army base located in southeastern Alberta near the hamlet of Ralston, is primarily a training and research facility. With its expansive and isolated testing grounds, it had been the site of numerous field tests by the British and American forces of chemical warheads during the World War II and Cold War eras. Since 1971, it has hosted the British Army Training Unit Suffield for large-scale armoured warfare exercises.

Starting out as the Experimental Station Suffield in 1941 (as a replacement for the French/British experimental station at Beni Ounif in Algeria that had fallen to Axis powers in 1940), it was taken under the wing of the Defence Research Board in 1947, then renamed in 1967 to Defence Research Establishment – Suffield (DRES). Meanwhile, CFB Suffield was formally established as a co-located army base in 1971, largely to take over support operations for DRES activities. Finally, as the Defence Research Board evolved to become the Research and Development Branch in 1974 and Defence Research and Development Canada (DRDC) in 2000, the establishment at Suffield became known as DRDC Suffield, one of a handful of defence research establishments in the country under the authority of the Assistant Deputy Minister – Science and Technology of the Department of National Defence. Virtually all live-agent chemical and biological defence training and research activities are conducted at CFB Suffield.

Responding to protests and concerns raised by citizen groups, notably Voice of Women and Science for Peace, and suspicion over the development of offensive weaponry, the then-Minister of National Defence Perrin Beatty commissioned William H. Barton, a distinguished diplomat and civil servant, to study the activities of the Department of National Defence (DND) in the area of biological and chemical warfare. The so-called Barton Report of 1988 made numerous recommendations, one of which was the establishment of an advisory committee of senior scientists to annually visit DND facilities and review its biological and chemical programs. The succeeding Minister, Bill McKnight, established the BCDRC in May 1990.

== Mandate ==
Canada is a State Party to the Convention on the Prohibition of the Development, Production and Stockpiling of Bacteriological (Biological) and Toxin Weapons and on their Destruction (commonly called the Biological and Toxin Weapons Convention) and to the Convention on the Prohibition of the Development, Production, Stockpiling and use of Chemical Weapons and on their Destruction (commonly called the Chemical Weapons Convention). However, the threat from such weapons persists and the Government has an obligation to ensure that members of the Canadian Forces are able to protect themselves against them, whether while deployed abroad or while supporting domestic responses to terrorist incidents or other emergencies involving these agents or related materials.

Nevertheless, the Canadian public and the international community have the right to be assured that Canada maintains a strictly defensive capability in regard to such materials and that any research, development or training activities undertaken in this vein are conducted safely. The mandate of the BCDRC is to provide an independent, third party review of the Biological and Chemical Defence (BCD) research, development and training activities undertaken by the Department of National Defence (DND) and the Canadian Forces (CF) with a view to assessing whether they are defensive in nature and conducted in a professional manner with no threat to public safety or the environment.

The committee's activities are funded under a renewable, five-year Contribution Agreement with DND. These activities vary somewhat from year to year, but always include lengthy and in-depth visits to DRDC Suffield, the Department of Foreign Affairs and International Trade, National Defence Headquarters in Ottawa and the CF Health Services headquarters in Ottawa, where briefings and updates on a wide variety of matters are received. It also takes note of Organisation for the Prohibition of Chemical Weapons (OPCW) inspection reports. Other sites of recurring visits are DRDC Valcartier and the Canadian Forces Nuclear, Biological and Chemical (CFNBC) School in Borden, Ontario. CF naval, army and air force installations, other DND sites such as the Canadian Joint Incident Response Unit, and such organizations as the Centre for Security Science are also selected for occasional visits. Committee members also attend relevant conferences, workshops, training courses and symposia.

The Committee's activities, role and arms'-length relationship are rather unusual among treaty signatories, and have been acknowledged overseas.

== Membership ==
The Committee consists of three non-government scientific members and an executive officer who coordinates and administers the affairs of the Committee. The scientific members include a toxicologist nominated by the Society of Toxicology of Canada, a microbiologist nominated by the Canadian Society of Microbiologists and a chemist nominated by the Chemical Institute of Canada. The Executive Officer is a retired senior military officer.

For all Committee members, the terms of service were initially set at three years, but have varied in length since then. One of the scientific members is chosen by the committee to act as the Committee's Chair.

== Reporting ==
In its initial mandate, the committee reported to the Chair, Defence Science Advisory Board, who relayed the report to the Deputy Minister and the Chief of Defence Staff, who then could respond and eventually release the report to the public. Later, the reports were posted on a DND website dedicated to the BCDRC. Today, the BCDRC operates at arm's length from Government and operates its own website where its annual reports since 1991 are posted. Ahead of publication, the reports are still reviewed by the DND for national security reasons but have never been edited or censored. They are then translated into the other official language.
