= Ralston, Alberta =

Ralston
- Designated place
- Crown Village of Ralston
- Location of Ralston Ralston (Canada)
- Coordinates: 50°14′45″N 111°10′07″W
- Country: Canada
- Province: Alberta
- Region: Southern Alberta
- Census division: 1
- Municipal district: Cypress County

Government
  - Type: Unincorporated
  - Governing body: Cypress County Council

Area (2021)
  - Land: 1 km^{2} (0.39 sq mi)

Population (2021)
  - Total: 257
  - Density: 258.1/km^{2} (668/sq mi)
- Time zone: UTC−06:00 (Alberta Time)
- Area codes: 403, 587, 825

The Crown Village of Ralston is east of Highway 884 on CFB Suffield within Cypress County in southern Alberta, Canada. It is approximately 3 km (1.9 mi) north of the Hamlet of Suffield and the Trans-Canada Highway.

== History ==
Approval was given in August 1947 for the construction of 60 prefabricated housing units for scientists, technologists, and military personnel working at the Suffield Experimental Station at a site named after the Honourable J. L. Ralston. Due to delays, major construction did not complete until 1953.

In June 1969, Dr. Perry of the Defence Research Establishment Suffield (DRES) informed the tenants of the Crown village that the Defence Research Board was considering the possibility of closing Ralston due to the financial situation of the federal government at the time. A decision was to be reached in September or October of that year, and would affect approximately 150 families, the bowling alley, theatre, store, swimming pool and elementary school. At the time, of the 200 homes, approximately 40 to 50 were vacant. A committee was looking at the cost saving options that would be phased in over two years. One option was to move Ralston's houses to Medicine Hat and discussions were under way with the Central Mortgage and Housing Corporation (CMHC) concerning the possibility of setting up new housing in Medicine Hat. In the letter given to the occupants of Ralston's houses, Dr. Perry stated "I cannot emphasize too strongly that a decision to close the village, if adopted, will not in any way imply a change in the decision already made to continue the program and operation of DRES at the level established last fall, and I can assure you that any final action will be taken so as to minimize the possible hardships which may arise."

In April 1970, Ralston was saved from closure when Dr. Perry released that the Defence Research Board was "very favorably inclined towards incorporation" in a private letter to a citizen committee. The formal announcement was to be made publicly by Léo Cadieux, Minister of National Defence. The citizen committee, chaired by Dr. James Lipp, was "very happy with the information. Maybe with luck we'll have it done (incorporated) this year." A site survey of Ralston was undertaken and the plan registered with the province. Negotiations ensued with the province in order to ensure Ralston would be debt-free and that all essential road, power and water services would remain intact. A survey of Ralston's tenants indicated that a majority of them were willing to purchase their houses that had already been assessed for value and taxation. The homes and lots would be bought through the CMHC for an average price of $4,000. In addition, a number of farm families in the Jenner/Iddesleigh area expressed interest in purchasing lots and houses.

On August 3, 1971, Agriculture Minister H.A. (Bud) Olson announce "that a Canadian Forces Base will be established on the military reservation of the Defence Research Establishment at Suffield, near Medicine Hat" where more than 6,000 British troops will train between May and November 1972. A few weeks later, on August 25, 1971, the Canadian Government ratified a ten-year agreement with the British Government that allowed the United Kingdom Forces to use the Military Training Area (MTA) on the Suffield Block. Ralston's future was uncertain until October 27, 1971, when the management of the village was transferred from the DRB to the Canadian Forces (CF) for use by CFB Suffield to support the visiting British forces. The agreement specified that the CF would "either proceed with the incorporation on schedule or be responsible for making, before December 31, 1971, a recommendations that the Minister's previous decision on this issue be revised."

Today, the Canadian Forces Housing Agency (CFHA) manages the housing at Ralston on behalf of the Department of National Defence. The CHFA has an entry for Ralston.

== Demographics ==
Population history of Ralston
Year	Pop.	±%
1971	475	—
1976	465	−2.1%
1981	357	−23.2%
1986	422	+18.2%
1991	413	−2.1%
1991A	418	+1.2%
1996	279	−33.3%
2001	181	−35.1%
2006	336	+85.6%
2011	409	+21.7%
2016	282	−31.1%
2021	257	−8.9%
Source: Statistics Canada

In the 2021 Census of Population conducted by Statistics Canada, Ralston had a population of 257 living in 87 of its 171 total private dwellings, a change of −8.9% from its 2016 population of 282. With a land area of 1 km^{2} (0.39 sq mi), it had a population density of 257.0/km^{2} (665.6/sq mi) in 2021.

As a designated place in the 2016 Census of Population conducted by Statistics Canada, Ralston had a population of 282 living in 90 of its 179 total private dwellings, a change of −31.1% from its 2011 population of 409. With a land area of 1 km^{2} (0.39 sq mi), it had a population density of 282.0/km^{2} (730.4/sq mi) in 2016.

== Attractions ==
Recreation venues and amenities including a "gymnasium, racquet courts, an ice rink, bowling alleys, a restaurant/pub, weight/cardio room, golf driving range, fitness trails, and retail stores all exist for the enjoyment of the community.". In August 2012, CFB Suffield hosted the 33rd annual Ralston Rodeo which is part of the Border Country Rodeo Circuit. "With competitors coming from Southern Alberta and Saskatchewan, and a few from B.C., they compete for the prizes and points, just as they would in any other rodeo." LCol Doug Claggett, CFB Suffield Base Commander in 2012, had this to say about the rodeo. "It’s important to go back to the original idea of why we actually started rodeo here in the first place. The British come here with their families and it is an introduction to the Canadian way of life, Alberta way of life."

== Education ==
Constructed in late 1951, the Ralston School is a recognized federal heritage building.

== See also ==
- List of communities in Alberta
- List of designated places in Alberta
