= DRDC Suffield =

Coordinates: 50°16′16.83″N 111°10′23.39″W

DRDC Suffield is a major Canadian military research facility located 5 km (3.1 mi) north of Suffield, Alberta, and is one of eight centres making up Defence Research and Development Canada (DRDC).

== History ==
The research facility commenced operations on June 11, 1941 as a joint British/Canadian biological and chemical defence facility as the Experimental Station Suffield under the administration of the Canadian Army. By the end of the Second World War, the station employed 584 personnel trained in chemistry, physics, meteorology, mathematics, pharmacology, pathology, bacteriology, physiology, entomology, veterinary science, mechanical and chemical engineering. In 1946, the station was placed completely in the hands the Canadian Army when the British withdrew their support. The responsibility for administrating the station, including the Suffield Block, was transferred to the Defence Research Board on April 30, 1947 by Order in Council PC 101/1727. In August 1950, the station was renamed to the Suffield Experimental Station (SES). In July 1967, the Suffield Experimental Station was renamed to the Defence Research Establishment Suffield (DRES).

On December 1, 1971, the Canadian Forces Base Suffield (CFB Suffield) was officially created and allocated to Mobile Command. A number of personnel and support functions were transferred from DRES to CFB Suffield and CFB Suffield was co-located with the Research Establishment.

In 1974, the Defence Research Board evolved into the Research and Development Branch which was administered under the Assistant Deputy Minister Materiel of the Canadian Department of National Defence. Another reorganization followed on April 1, 2000 when the Research and Development Branch was placed under the Assistant Deputy Minister Science & Technology and renamed to Defence Research and Development Canada (DRDC).

== DRDC Suffield today ==
Research areas at the Centre focus on military engineering, mobility and autonomous systems, weapons system evaluation and chemical-biological defence. These scientific and technological activities are supported by meteorological, photographic, information, design and development, materiel management and field support services. DRDC Suffield also hosts the Counter Terrorism Technology Centre (CTTC) which is a core component in enabling Canada to respond to domestic and international chemical, biological, radiological, nuclear and explosive (CBRNE) incidents.

Inspections by site visit teams from the Organisation for the Prohibition of Chemical Weapons and annual visits by the Biological and Chemical Defence Review Committee ensure that DRDC Suffield's training and research and development activities in the area of chemical and biological defence are all compliant with Canada's obligations under the Chemical Weapons Convention and the Biological Weapons Convention and are carried out in a professional manner, with no threat to humans nor to the environment.
