= Suffield National Wildlife Area =

Coordinates: 50°34′05″N 110°26′51″W

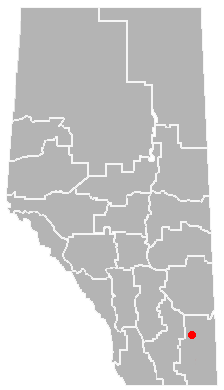
Location of Suffield, Alberta

Suffield National Wildlife Area (SNWA) is a National Wildlife Area located within the boundaries of CFB Suffield in Alberta, Canada.

SNWA was formally created on the 19th of June, 2003 when it was officially gazetted under Canada Wildlife Act Regulations. The Department of National Defence (DND) was delegated authority to administer and control the NWA. The Base Commander is responsible for operations, management, and permitting in the SNWA.

CFB Suffield itself was created in 1971 when control of the Suffield Block was transferred from the Defence Research Establishment Suffield as part of the reorganization to support the mechanized training activities of the British Army Training Unit Suffield on the northern two-thirds of the area. The 2960 km² area of the Suffield Block was expropriated by the Province of Alberta during the Second World War on behalf of the Canadian Federal Government. The land was leased to the Federal Government for ninety-nine years at a cost of one dollar per year to support the operation of the Experimental Station Suffield. Upon the termination of the Second World War, ownership of the British Block (or Suffield Block) was transferred from the province to the federal government in exchange for a large number of army and air camps and building from the Dominion Government (War Assets Corporation).

The portion of the Suffield Block that is now the National Wildlife Area was zoned for environmental protection and included three parts: the Middle Sand Hills, the Mixed Grass Prairie zone, the South Saskatchewan River zone.

In 1974 Canada and Alberta signed a surface access agreement for the purpose of developing petroleum reserves on CFB Suffield. Since that time there have been over 14,000 oil and gas wells drilled at CFB Suffield. Most of this activity was conducted by the Alberta Energy Company (AEC), which is now EnCana Corporation. The company has drilled 1,163 natural gas wells within the SNWA, all prior to the creation of the SNWA. EnCana has proposed an additional drilling of about 1,275 more natural gas wells over three years. This shallow-gas infill drilling program was the subject of an environmental assessment. In 2012, the proposed project was rejected, as "the significant adverse environmental effects that the Project is likely to cause are not justified."
