= Canada and weapons of mass destruction =

Canada has never maintained or possessed their own weapons of mass destruction. Canada participated in NATO’s nuclear mission between 1963 and 1984, which included the hosting of US nuclear weapons on its soil. Canada ratified the Nuclear Non-proliferation Treaty in 1970.

In 1950, the first US nuclear weapon entered Canadian soil when the US Air Force Strategic Air Command (SAC) stationed 11 model 1561 Fat Man atomic bombs at RCAF Station Goose Bay in Labrador. Goose Bay was used as an aircraft staging location for both the SAC and the Royal Air Force's V Force. The bombs were landed; crews relieved; aircraft refueled, or repaired; without returning to bases in the continental US. Nuclear weapons designs of the time were easily damaged but precise devices, that required off-aircraft inspection (after landing), and environmental sheltering (at a secure warm/dry location) while their carrier aircraft was on the ground for routine maintenance or repair.

From 1963 to 1984, the US deployed a total of four tactical nuclear weapons systems in Canada, which amounted to several hundred nuclear warheads.

Throughout the Cold War, Canada was closely aligned with defensive elements of United States programs in both NORAD and NATO. In 1964, Canada sent its White Paper on Defence to U.S. Secretary of Defense Robert McNamara to ensure he would not, "find anything in these references contrary to any views [he] may have expressed," although "references" may indicate quotes or glosses in the paper attributed to him, which they wished him to verify as authentic and correct, thus making the gesture a polite courtesy.

Three of the four nuclear-capable weapons systems were withdrawn by the United States by 1972. The single system retained, the AIR-2 Genie had a yield of 1.5 kilotons, and was designed to strike enemy aircraft as opposed to ground targets.

== Nuclear weapons ==
=== Early history: World War II and into the Cold War ===
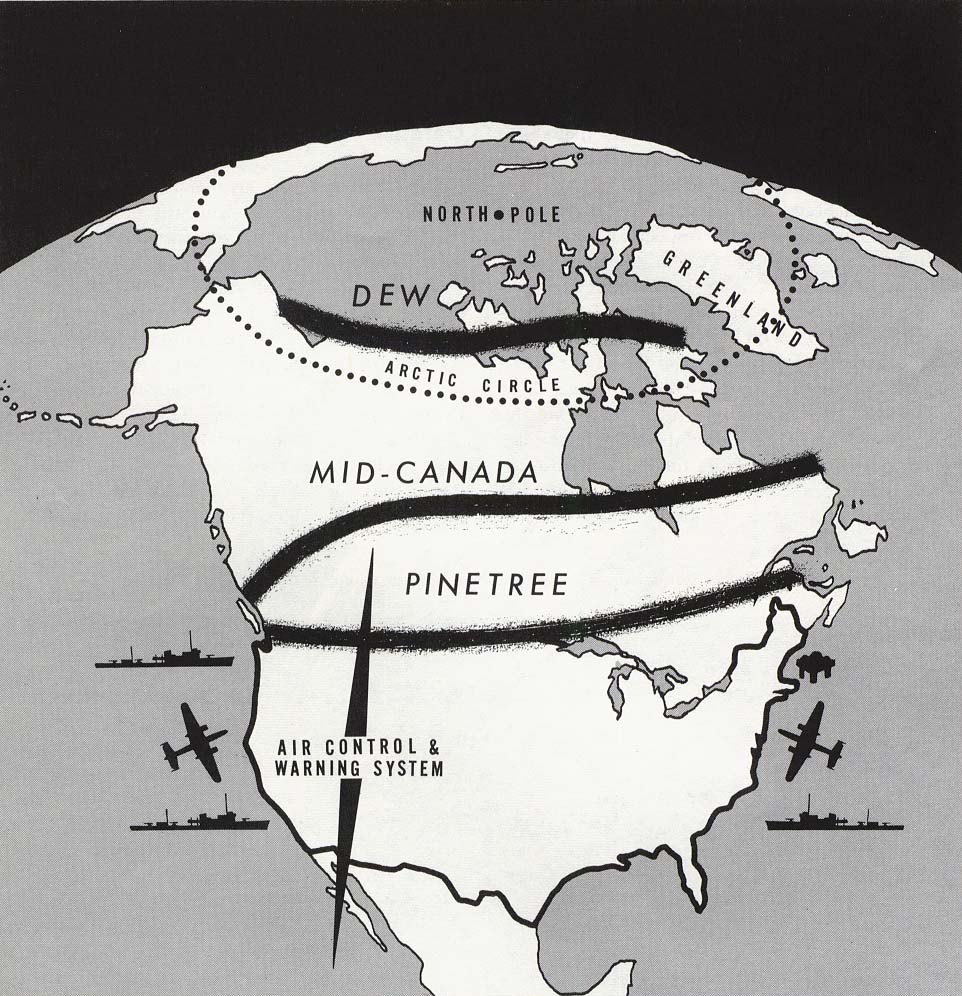
North American Warning Lines - Arrays of radar stations arranged east-west across the continent to provide to NORAD information in the case of incoming Soviet bombing sorties.

Canada's military relationship with the United States has grown significantly since the Second World War. Although the Dominion of Canada came into being on July 1, 1867, Canadian foreign policy was determined in Britain. Canada entered the Great War in 1914 when Great Britain declared war on Germany and the Austro-Hungarian Empire: Constitutionally, Canada was subject to the British declaration of war, as were other British Dominion countries. Canadian foreign policy became independent in December 1931 (save for the issues of Commonwealth/Dominion war and peace) with the passage of the Statute of Westminster. On September 10, 1939, Canada declared war on Germany, a week later than Great Britain. Following the German declaration of war on the United States on December 11, 1941, the U.S. declared war on Germany the same day. This was three days after declaring war on Japan on December 8 following the attack on Pearl Harbor in Honolulu, Hawaii. Canada had actually declared war on Japan on December 7, a day earlier than the US and the UK's declaration.

One of the first formal agreements for military cooperation was made in August 1940. Known as the Ogdensburg Agreement, it established the Permanent Joint Board on Defence. Both the United States and Canada are founding members of the United Nations as well as the North Atlantic Treaty Organization (NATO). In 1957, they signed the NORAD Agreement, which created the North American Air Defense Command to defend the continent against attacks from the USSR.

In the 1942 Quebec Agreement, the United Kingdom and the United States agreed to develop the "Tube Alloys" Project and created a committee to manage the project which included C. D. Howe, the Canadian Minister of Munitions and Supply. This was the code name for the British Uranium Committee project which had worked on a theoretical design for an atomic bomb. One significant contribution was a calculation of the critical mass of uranium. The mass was less than earlier estimates and suggested that development of a fission bomb was practical. This calculation had been part of shipment of secret scientific and technical research in Great Britain that was shared with the United States to get American support for the war and American production of this new equipment. Materials shared through the Tizard Mission included the cavity magnetron which improved radar, British information related to the German Enigma machines, jet engine designs as well as the Frisch-Peierls memorandum.

Canada's role in the Manhattan Project besides providing raw material, including uranium ore from a northern mine which may have been used in the construction of the atom bomb that was dropped on Hiroshima in 1945, was to provide at least one scientist working at Los Alamos (Louis Slotin), and hosting the Montreal Laboratory which took over from Tube Alloys. Canada would continue to supply fissionable material to the US and other allies throughout the Cold War although Canada never developed indigenous nuclear weapons as did NATO allies France and the United Kingdom.

After briefly allowing nuclear weapons to be temporarily stationed in Goose Bay, Labrador, Canada agreed to a long term lease of the Goose Bay base to the US Strategic Air Command. The Americans were refused permission to stockpile bomb casings for the B-36 at Goose Bay. These bombs would have been armed in wartime with materials brought from the United States. Goose Bay was used as a base for air refueling tankers which were to support the SAC B-47 and B-52 bomber forces.

In 1951 the Pinetree Line was established north of the US-Canada border, and in 1953 Canada built the Mid-Canada Line, which was staffed and operated by the Canadian military. In 1954 the Distant Early Warning Line (DEW) was established jointly by the US and Canada in the Arctic. The Pinetree Line was built to control the air battle between the NORAD interceptor forces and crewed Soviet bombers. Beginning with Ground-controlled interception updated from the Second World War, the system has been computerized and automated with at least four new generations of technology being employed. It was clear, even in the early years of the Cold War, that on paper, Canada and the US were to be jointly responsible for the defence of the continent. In execution, Canadian investment in air defence has decreased significantly with the decline of the intercontinental strategic bomber threat. In the 1950s the RCAF contributed fourteen squadrons of CF-100 interceptors and this was reduced to three squadrons of CF-101s by 1970. Some of this is due to improved technology but more is due to the decline of the bomber threat and reductions in Canadian military spending.

=== Inventory of Canada's nuclear armaments ===
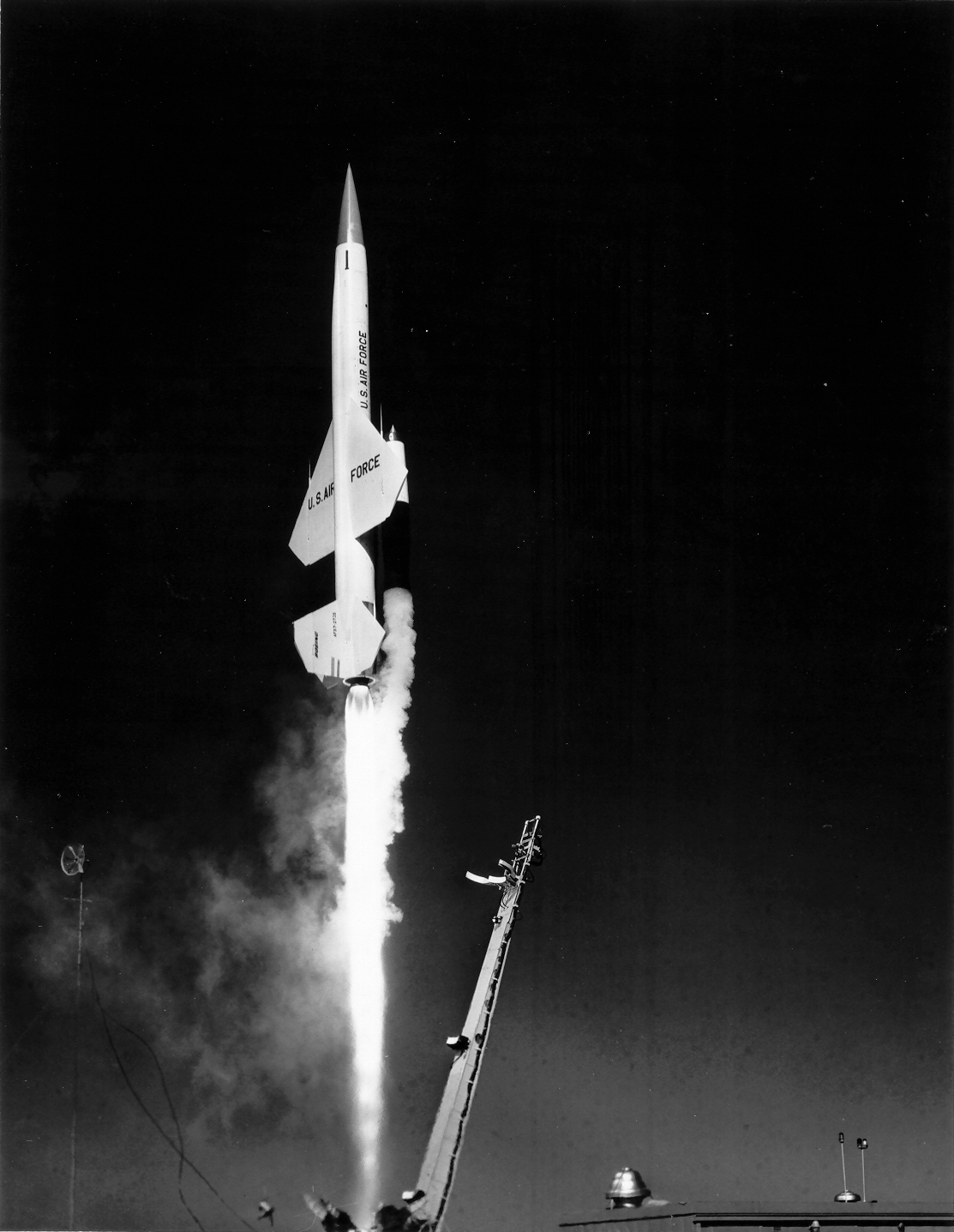
BCIM-10 BOMARC; Warhead: W40 7-10 kiloton

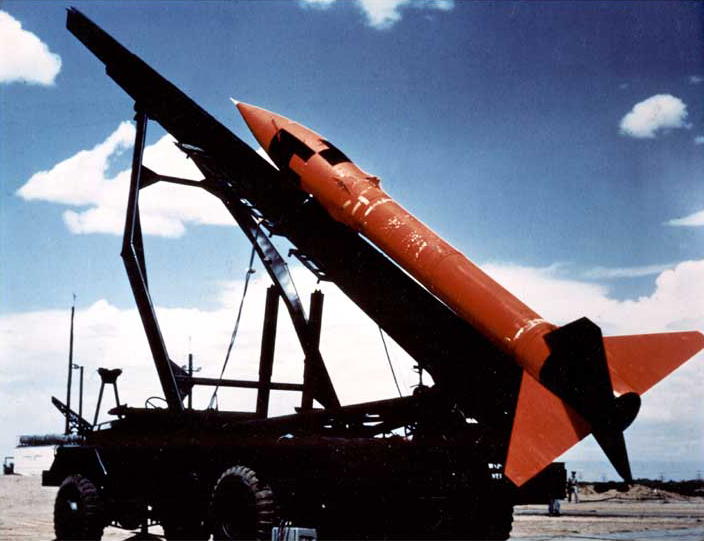
MGR-1 Honest John; Warhead W7 8-61 kiloton

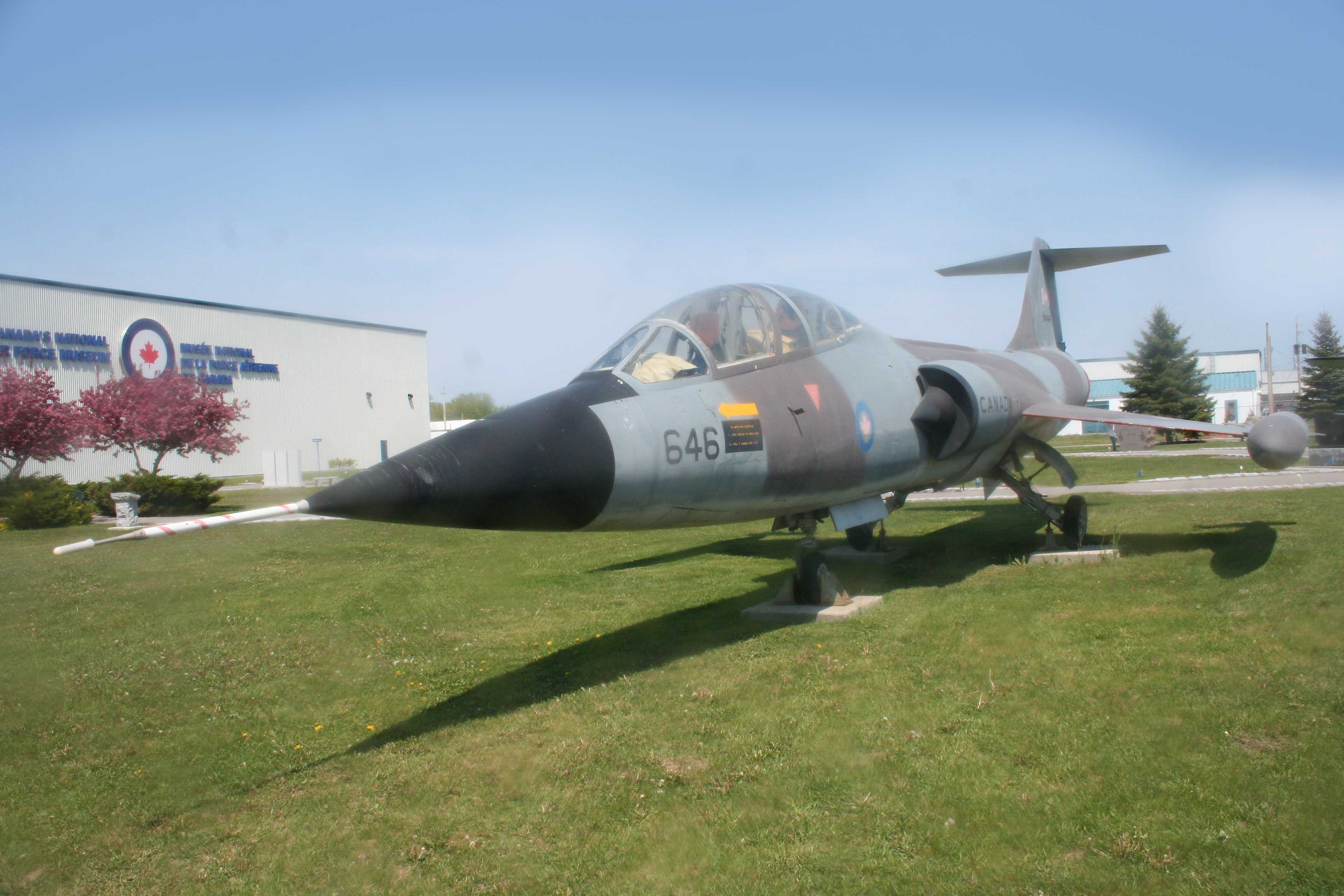
CF-104 Starfighter; Warhead: B57 bomb 5-20 kilotons; B28 bomb 70-350 kt; B43 bomb 1 Mt

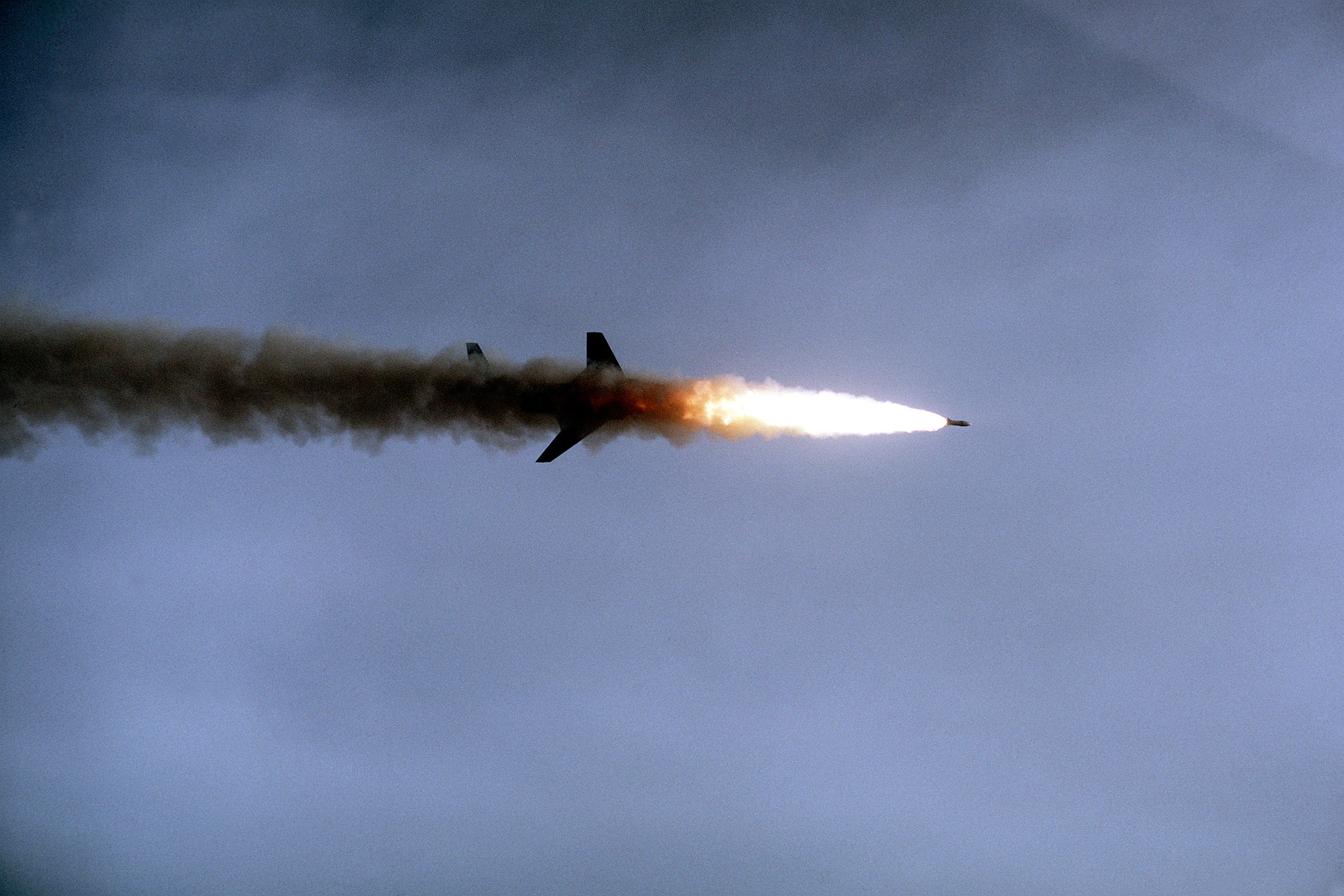
Voodoo weapons test; Combat Warhead: W25 1.5 kilotons

Goose Air Base in Labrador was the site of the first US nuclear weapons in Canada, when in 1950 the United States Air Force Strategic Air Command stationed 11 model 1561 Fat Man and Mark 4 atomic bombs at the base in the summer, and flew them out in December. While returning to Davis–Monthan Air Force Base with one of the bombs on board, a USAF B-50 heavy bomber encountered engine trouble, had to drop, and conventionally detonate, the bomb over the St. Lawrence River, contaminating the river with uranium-238. The detonation was near Saint-André-de-Kamouraska. In 1953, Strategic Air Command constructed ten new reinforced concrete buildings as part of a heavily secured weapon storage area located at 53°17′43.9″N 60°22′36.6″W, surrounded by two barbed wire fences and several armed guard towers. Goose Air Base Weapons Storage Area was the only weapons storage area in Canada constructed to house the Mark 4, AIM-26 Falcon, and AIR-2 Genie nuclear weapons.

The warheads were never in the sole possession of Canadian personnel. They were the property of the Government of the United States and were always under the direct supervision of a "Custodial Detachment" from the United States Air Force (or Army, in the case of Honest John warheads).

Through 1984, Canada would deploy four American designed nuclear weapons delivery systems accompanied by hundreds of warheads:

- 56 CIM-10 BOMARC surface-to-air missiles.
- 4 MGR-1 Honest John rocket systems, each with four rockets and four warheads, for a total of 16 W31 nuclear warheads the Canadian Army deployed in Germany.
- 108 nuclear W25 Genie rockets carried by 54 CF-101 Voodoos.
- estimates of 90 to 210 tactical (20–60 kiloton) nuclear warheads assigned to 6 CF-104 Starfighter squadrons (about 90 aircraft) based with NATO in Europe (there is a lack of open sources detailing exactly how many warheads were deployed).

In practice, each of 36 NATO squadrons (initially six Canadian squadrons Number 1 Air Division RCAF) would provide two aircraft and pilots to a Quick Reaction Alert facility. The 'Q' aircraft could be launched with an armed US nuclear weapon within 15 minutes of receiving the 'go' order. This arrangement was called the NATO Quick Reaction Alert Force. It provided a dispersed force upwards of 100 strike aircraft for use on short notice. Missions were targeted at troop concentrations, airfields, bridges, assembly and choke points and other tactical targets in order to slow the massive tank formations of the Red Army as they poured into the Fulda Gap and on towards the Rhine River.

In total, there were between 250 and 450 nuclear warheads on Canadian bases between 1963 and 1972. There were at most 108 Genie missiles armed with 1.5 kiloton W25 warheads present from 1963 to 1984. There may have been fewer due to attrition of CF-101s as the program aged and as incoming CF-18s became combat-qualified. In addition, between 1968 and 1994 the United States stored the Mk 101 Lulu and B57 nuclear bombs at Naval Station Argentia, Newfoundland.

This number decreased significantly through the years as various systems were withdrawn from service. The Honest John was retired by the Canadian Army in 1970. The Bomarc missile was phased out in 1972 and the CF-104 Strike/Attack squadrons in West Germany were reduced in number and reassigned to conventional ground attack at about the same time. From late in 1972, the CF-101 interceptor force remained as the only nuclear-armed system in Canadian use until it was replaced by the CF-18 in 1984.

=== Cold War relationship with the US ===
Canada's Cold War military doctrine and fate was inextricably tied with that of the United States. The two nations shared responsibility for continental air defence through NORAD (North American Air Defense Command) and both belonged to NATO and contributed forces in Europe. Should nuclear war with the USSR have broken out, Canada would have been in harm's way because of the geographic position between both the USSR and US. Prime Minister Brian Mulroney's 1987 Canadian White Paper on Defence acknowledged this reality citing that, "Soviet strategic planners must regard Canada and the United States as a single set of military targets no matter what political posture we might assume." This sums up Canada's Cold War predicament well, as Canada's geo-political relationship with the US meant that Canada would inevitably be widely devastated by any US-Soviet nuclear exchange, whether it was targeted or not. It led to a familiar phrase of the time, "incineration without representation".

The DEW Line and Pinetree Line radar systems formed the backbone of continental air defense in the 1950s and 1960s. The most likely routes for Soviet aircraft attacking the United States came through Canada. In particular, the Eastern Seaboard of the United States would be approached through the Greenland-Iceland-UK gap and a line of SAGE search radars ran down the coast of Labrador and southeast to St. John's, Newfoundland. These stations were supported by RCAF CF-101 interceptors at Bagotville, Quebec and Chatham, New Brunswick, as well as USAF F-102 interceptors stationed at Ernest Harmon Air Base in Stephenville, Newfoundland. These were presumably equipped with nuclear-armed AIM-26 Nuclear Falcon missiles as this was a standard configuration on the F-102.

Canada hosted no intercontinental strategic bombers but the Strategic Air Command base at Goose Bay Labrador hosted a large number of KC-135 air refueling tankers. These were intended to top up the fuel tanks of the outbound B-52 strike force headed for targets in the USSR. They also supported the SAC Airborne Alert Force and would have refueled any surviving bombers returning from the USSR.

=== "Incineration without representation" ===
For the Canadian public, "incineration without representation" led to a popular belief that the doctrine of mutual assured destruction (MAD) was in Canada's best interest. MAD was the Cold War doctrine which held that as long as both the US and USSR possessed significant nuclear arsenals, any nuclear war would assuredly destroy both nations, thereby discouraging either state from launching any nuclear offensive. For Canadians, MAD was appealing in this light, as Canada was unlikely to emerge from any nuclear exchange unscathed given its position between the two countries, considering that any weapons shot down or falling short were likely to fall on Canadian soil.

In Prime Minister Pierre Trudeau's 1971 Defence White Paper, this dynamic was noted:

"One of the most important changes in international affairs in recent years had been the increase in stability of nuclear deterrence, and the emergence of what is, in effect, nuclear parity between the United States and the Soviet Union. Each side now has sufficient nuclear strength to assure devastating retaliation in the event of a surprise attack by the other, and thus neither could rationally consider launching a deliberate attack."

Even as late as 1987, Prime Minister Mulroney's Defence White Paper acknowledged that, "each superpower now has the capacity to obliterate the other,…the structure of mutual deterrence today is effective and stable. The Government believes that it must remain so." Given the prospect of "incineration without representation", Canadians seemed to feel that the doctrine which most encouraged restraint was the strategically soundest one to support.

Canadians were still nervous about U.S. foreign policy, however. In 1950, when U.S. President Harry S. Truman announced that Washington had not entirely ruled out the use of nuclear weapons in Korea, future Prime Minister Lester B. Pearson recalled that the remarks caused Ottawa to collectively "shudder". One Cold War contemporary observer even remarked that,

"Canadians often think that their neighbour to the south exhibits wild swings of emotional attachments… with other countries; that it is impatient, is prone to making sweeping judgments, and generally lacks sophistication and subtlety in its approach to the Soviet bloc and the cold war."

However, if Canadian leadership was nervous about U.S. foreign policy, they did not voice their discontent through actions. Canada was consistently and significantly cooperative with the United States when it came to nuclear weapons doctrine and deployments through the Cold War.

=== Continued cooperation with the U.S. to present ===
The Government of Canada formally agreed to every major North Atlantic Treaty Organization (NATO) strategic document, including those that implied a US strike-first policy. This may suggest that successive Canadian governments were willing to follow US and NATO doctrine even if said doctrine was counter to the publicly favoured (and politically supported) doctrine of Mutual Assured Destruction. Furthermore, Canada allowed for forward deployment of US bombers and participated actively and extensively in the NORAD program; as well, Canada cooperated with the US when it came to research, early warning, surveillance and communications. Canada was second only to West Germany in hosting nuclear related facilities. In short, the Canadian Government was thoroughly committed to supporting US nuclear doctrine and deployments through the Cold War, in spite of any popular reservations concerning this dynamic.

While it has no more permanently stationed nuclear weapons as of 1984, Canada continues to cooperate with the United States and its nuclear weapons program. Canada allows testing of nuclear weapon delivery systems; nuclear weapon carrying vessels are permitted to visit Canadian ports; and aircraft carrying nuclear warheads are permitted to fly in Canadian airspace with the permission of the Canadian government. There is, however, popular objection to this federal policy. Over 60% of Canadians live in cities or areas designated "Nuclear Weapons Free", reflecting a contemporary disinclination toward nuclear weapons in Canada. Canada also remains under the NATO 'nuclear umbrella'; even after disarming itself in 1984, Canada has maintained support for nuclear armed nations as doing otherwise would be counter to Canadian NATO commitments.

== Chemical weapons ==
During both World War I and World War II, Canada was a major producer and developer of chemical weapons for the Allied war effort. These were used in combat in World War I, but not in World War II. Human experimentation was carried out during World War II, with Experimental Station Suffield becoming the leading research facility. Thousands of Canadian soldiers were exposed to mustard gas, blister agents, tear gas, and other chemical agents, and some were permanently injured as a result. Following both world wars, Canadian military forces returning home were directed to dump millions of tons of unexploded ordnance (UXOs) into the Atlantic Ocean off ports in Nova Scotia; an undetermined amount of these UXOs are known to be chemical weapons. The 1972 London Convention prohibited further marine dumping of UXOs, however the chemical weapons existing off the shores of Nova Scotia for over 60 years continue to bring concern to local communities and the fishing industry.

Human testing of chemical weapons such as sarin, mustard gas, and VX gas continued in Canada into the early 1970s. Canada eventually abandoned the use of lethal chemical weapons, and had to devote a great deal of effort to safely destroying them. Since 1990, the Biological and Chemical Defence Review Committee has conducted annual site visits and inspections to verify that all remaining military activities involving chemical warfare agents are defensive in nature. Canada ratified the Chemical Weapons Convention on September 26, 1995. Canada still employs riot control agents, such as tear gas and pepper spray, which are classified as non-lethal weapons for domestic law enforcement purposes.

== Biological weapons ==
Canada had a biological warfare research program in the early to middle part of the 20th century. Canadian research involved developing protections against biowarfare attacks and for offensive purposes, often with the help of the UK and the US. Canada has thus experimented with such things as weaponized anthrax, botulinum toxin, ricin, rinderpest virus, Rocky Mountain spotted fever, plague, Brucellosis and tularemia. CFB Suffield is the leading research centre. Canada says it has destroyed all military stockpiles and no longer conducts toxin warfare research. As with chemical weapons, the Biological and Chemical Defence Review Committee has since 1990 conducted annual site visits and inspections at CFB Suffield and elsewhere to verify that all remaining military activities involving biological warfare agents are purely defensive in nature. Canada ratified the Biological Weapons Convention on September 18, 1972.

== Disarmament ==
Canada is a member of every international disarmament organization, except for the Treaty on the Prohibition of Nuclear Weapons (TPNW), and is committed to pushing for an end to nuclear weapons testing, reduction in nuclear arsenals, a ban on all chemical and biological weapons, bans on weapons in outer space, and blocks on nuclear proliferation. However, in recent years it has become less vocal on the issue of disarmament, and has even opposed the TPNW; the need for increased border defence, particularly in the Territories, has recently overshadowed other issues in military circles.

Canada maintains a division of its Foreign Affairs department devoted to pursuing these ends. It also dedicates significant resources in trying to verify that current treaties are being obeyed, passing much information on to the United Nations. In the 1970s, Canada discussed building a reconnaissance satellite to monitor adherence to such treaties, but these plans were shelved. A public furor arose in 1983, when the Canadian government approved a plan to test cruise missiles in Alberta.

Canada continues to promote peaceful nuclear technology exemplified by the CANDU reactor. Unlike most designs, the CANDU does not require enriched fuel, and in theory is therefore much less likely to lead to the development of weapon-grade fissionables. However, like all power reactor designs, CANDU reactors produce and use plutonium in their fuel rods during normal operation (roughly 50% of the energy generated in a CANDU reactor comes from the in situ fission of plutonium created in the uranium fuel), and this plutonium could be used in a nuclear explosive if separated and converted to metallic form (albeit only as reactor-grade plutonium, and therefore of limited military usefulness). Accordingly, CANDU reactors, like most power reactors in the world, are subject to safeguards under the United Nations which prevent possible diversion of plutonium. CANDU reactors are designed to be refuelled while running, which makes the details of such safeguards significantly different from other reactor designs. The end result, however, is a consistent and internationally accepted level of proliferation risk. The CANDU reactor was also proposed as a means of destroying surplus plutonium through using MOX fuel due to its capability of online fuel shuffling providing flexibility to deal with different reactor kinetics.

== See also ==
- Defence Research and Development Canada
- Gerald Bull
- Canadian Joint Incident Response Unit (CJIRU)
- Canadian Voice of Women for Peace
- Biological and Chemical Defence Review Committee
