= Operation Snowball (test) =

Canadian explosives test in 1964

Coordinates: 50.272401°N 111.172639°W

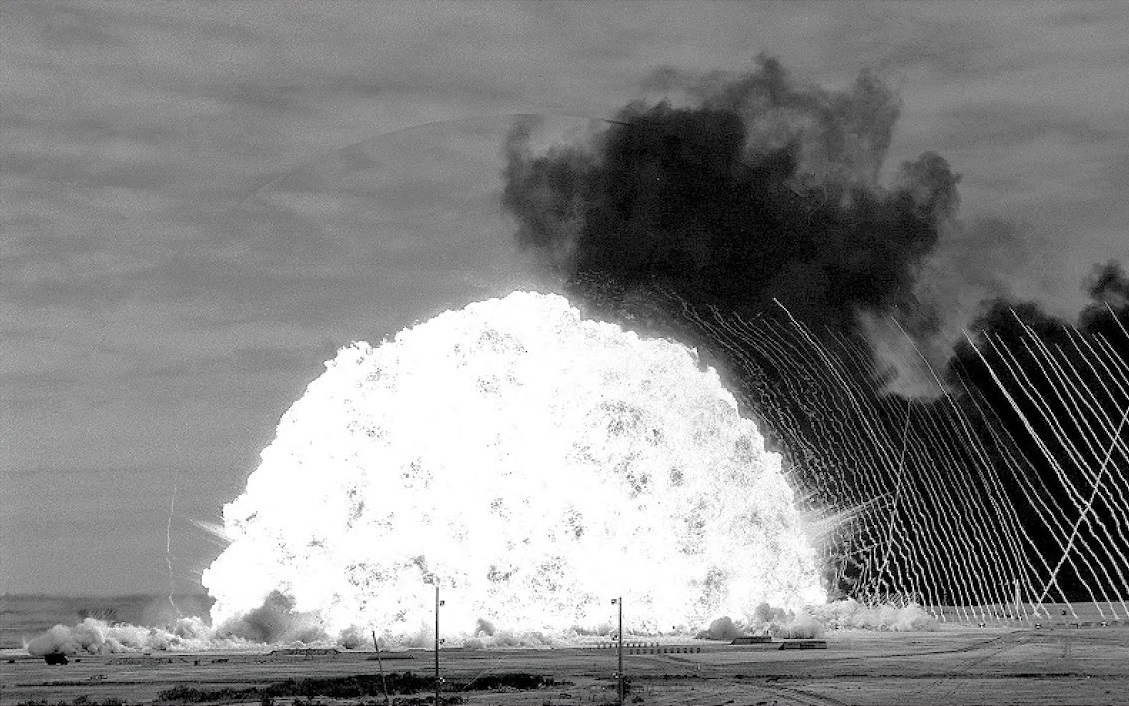
- Detonation of a 500-short-ton (450 t) hemispherical surface charge of TNT. The shock wave front is visible and can be seen affecting the smoke trails. Objects in the foreground give a sense of the massive scale of the explosion.

Information
- Country: Canada
- Test site: Suffield Experimental Station, Alberta
- Date: July 17, 1964
- Number of tests: 1
- Agency: Defence Research Board, TTCP
- Explosive: TNT
- Configuration: Stacked hemisphere
- Yield: 0.5 kilotons of TNT (2.1 TJ)

Test chronology

Operation Snowball was a 1964 conventional explosive test made to obtain information on nuclear weapon detonations run by the Defence Research Board of Canada with participation from the United Kingdom and United States. A detonation of 500 short tons (450 t) of TNT was used to study the resulting phenomena. The test was held at the Suffield Experimental Station in Alberta and was the largest ever man-made, non-accidental explosion in Canada. The test was also the first of its kind using a stacked TNT block hemisphere of such magnitude, a method repeated in six subsequent tests such as Operation Sailor Hat and Prairie Flat. The test allowed verifying predicted properties of shock and blast and determining its effect on a variety of military targets at varied distances from ground zero.

== Background ==
Suffield Experimental Station is in an isolated part of the rolling prairie terrain of Alberta and at the time of the test was part of a 1,000-square-mile (2,600 km^{2}) test range. This unique landscape offers clear views due to treelessness and favourable weather conditions. Starting in fall 1963, teams from the involved countries began assembling at the test grounds for the joint operation, one of many in a series of non-nuclear blast tests under the Tripartite Technical Cooperation Program. Initial preparations and construction work began in the winter of 1963 which was unusually mild and proved helpful. Virtually the entire station was mobilized for the effort and unusual equipment was designed and manufactured at the site's engineering and machine shops.

The casting of the TNT was performed on site and began two years in advance of the test. Molten TNT was poured into special 12-by-12-by-4-inch (300 mm × 300 mm × 100 mm) rectangular moulds and allowed to cool for 5 hours, producing smooth caramel-coloured rectangular blocks. A total of 30,678 were made with an average weight of 32.6 pounds (14.8 kg) each.

== Test ==
Construction of the TNT hemisphere began six days before detonation. To protect from dust and sunlight and due to risk of lightning, the construction was not done in the open; instead, a building was constructed at ground zero that was to be wheeled away when the charge was complete. Each block was carefully fitted into a pre-calculated position to approximate a perfect hemisphere. When completed the stack measured 34 feet (10 m) in diameter.

Columns were drilled 80 feet (24 m) into the ground at the blast site and then back filled with a coloured soil mix to measure the expected horizontal and vertical displacement. Various military targets were also placed around the blast site. Local residents in Medicine Hat may have seen unusual cargo arriving on rail flatcars including heavy Jupiter and Nike configuration rockets. Other targets included a minefield, chambers and tunnels, reinforced concrete arches, fibreglass shelters, full-scale troop models exposed and inside vehicles and gas masks. 60% of the targets were buried. Smoke mortars were installed to provide a white trail by which the shock wave could be tracked high above ground. An RCAF Neptune aircraft was also immediately above the test area for aerial photography.

The detonation turned the TNT into a mass of highly pressurized gas and produced a large fireball and mushroom-shaped cloud. The resulting crater was 240 feet (73 m) across and within minutes partially filled with water. Unexpectedly, the crater also had a central updraft similar to moon craters which resulted in much speculation by the scientists. Many target objects were moved and damaged by the overpressure blast, especially the heavy rockets, and two M113 armoured personnel carriers were flipped on their side. After the test, a full cross section of the crater was excavated to analyze the effects below ground.
