= Emlyn Davies (scientist) =

Welsh-British scientist/administrator

Emlyn Llewelyn Davies OBE FRMetS (24 June 1897–21 May 1978) was a Welsh scientist and defence research administrator who played a leading role in British and Canadian military scientific research during the Second World War. He was Superintendent of Experiments at Porton Down and then founding Chief Superintendent of the Suffield Experimental Station in Alberta, Canada. He later served as Vice-Chairman of the Canadian Defence Research Board.

== Career ==
Davies was elected a Fellow of the Royal Meteorological Society on 19 June 1929, when he was listed as based at the Experimental Station, Porton, Wiltshire, the United Kingdom's principal chemical warfare research establishment. He conducted research and published on temperatures at or close to ground level. By 1940, Davies was Superintendent of Experiments at Porton.

In October 1940, Davies travelled to Canada to seek a large area for British chemical-warfare field trials, after Britain had lost access to its previous proving grounds in North Africa. During his visit, Davies met Jack Mackenzie, who arranged site surveys on Davies behalf, and Otto Maass, who introduced Davies to the chemical warfare research underway in Toronto, Canada, and Edgewood, USA. He returned to Canada in early 1941 and was directly involved in establishing the Suffield site near Medicine Hat, Alberta. Formal approval for the Suffield Experimental Station was given in August 1941, and Davies became its first Chief Superintendent.

Davies directed the station's scientific programme during the war. He was involved in its early development and in demonstrations of chemical-warfare techniques to visiting American officials. He later administered experiments involving Canadian military personnel, and during 1944–45 pressed Canadian authorities for additional personnel as the supply of volunteers declined.

Davies was awarded the OBE for this work in June 1946.

Following the war, Davies served as Vice-Chairman of the Defence Research Board of Canada. In 1955, he resigned that position to become the Board's liaison officer in London.

== Legacy ==
Davies was one of the principal figures involved in establishing the Suffield Experimental Station, which became Canada's principal defence research establishment for chemical and biological warfare research during the Second World War and later evolved into the Defence Research Establishment Suffield.
