= Defence Research Establishment Suffield =

Coordinates: 50°16′16.83″N 111°10′23.39″W

The Defence Research Establishment Suffield was the name of the military research facility located 5 km (3.1 mi) north of Suffield, Alberta, from 1967 to its renaming to DRDC Suffield in 2000.

== History ==
After being renamed from the Suffield Experimental Station in July 1967, the Defence Research Establishment Suffield (DRES) continued to operate under the Defence Research Board. On August 3, 1971, Agriculture Minister H.A. (Bud) Olson announce "that a Canadian Forces Base will be established on the military reservation of the Defence Research Establishment at Suffield, near Medicine Hat" where more than 6,000 British troops will train between May and November 1972. A few weeks later, on August 25, 1971, the Canadian Government ratified a ten-year agreement with the British Government that allowed the United Kingdom Forces to use the Military Training Area (MTA) on the Suffield Block. The MTA occupies the northern three quarters of the military reserve and the remaining southern area was named the Experimental Proving Grounds (EPG).

On December 1, 1971, the Canadian Forces Base Suffield (CFB Suffield) was officially created and allocated to Mobile Command. 162 staff members, over 90 buildings, over 80 vehicles, and the Crown Village of Ralston were transferred from DRES to CFB Suffield and CFB Suffield was co-located with the Research Establishment.

In 1974, the Defence Research Board evolved into the Research and Development Branch which was administered under the Assistant Deputy Minister Materiel of the Canadian Department of National Defence. Another reorganization followed on April 1, 2000, when the Research and Development Branch was placed under the Assistant Deputy Minister Science & Technology and renamed to Defence Research and Development Canada (DRDC).

Chief DRES	Tenure
Mr. E.H. Bobyn	September 1964 To 1968
Dr. B.J. Perry	1968 to June 2, 1971
C.R. Iverson	June 11, 1971 to ?
R.M. Hegge	? to 1979
Dr. C.H. Baker	1981
Dr. J.C. Moldon	Aug 1990 to ?

== Large events ==
Large chemical training events

- Exercise Vacuum was undertaken in the fall of 1968 with the objective "To test, under realistic battle conditions, new defensive doctrine, training agents, clothing and equipment designed as a result of shortcomings brought out in previous trials ..." Almost 2000 men participated in Exercise Vacuum, which was held on the Suffield Block. Simulants (mainly based on the tear gas CS) were used in the experimental phase of Exercise Vacuum.

Large explosive events

- Distant Plain 6 was a 100-ton detonation (spherical form) in 1967
- The Prairie Flat 500-ton detonation (spherical form) on 9 August 1968 at the Watching Hill test site formed a 64-meter diameter crater
- The Dial Pack 500-ton detonation on 23 July 1970.
