= CKBF-FM =

BFBS radio station at CFB Suffield in Suffield, Alberta, Canada

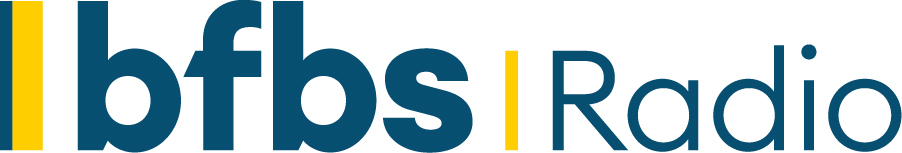
- Suffield, Alberta; Canada
- Broadcast area: Canadian Forces Base Suffield
- Frequency: 104.1 MHz
- Branding: BFBS Canada

Programming
- Affiliations: British Forces Broadcasting Service

Ownership
- Owner: Base Commander, Canadian Forces Base Suffield

History
- First air date: August 16, 2000
- Call sign meaning: British Forces

Technical information
- Licensing authority: CRTC
- ERP: 1.067 kW (average); 4.276 kW (peak)
- HAAT: 118 metres (387 ft)
- Transmitter coordinates: 50°09′45″N 110°57′23″W
- Repeater: CKBF-FM-1 (107.1 MHz) (future)

Links
- Website: radio.bfbs.com/stations/bfbs-canada

CKBF-FM is a Canadian radio station, which broadcasts at 104.1 FM and online at CFB Suffield in the province of Alberta. The station airs a mixture of news and music programming, some produced locally for British and Canadian personnel stationed at the base, and some syndicated from the British Forces Broadcasting Service for personnel of the British Army Training Unit Suffield.

The station was licensed by the Canadian Radio-television and Telecommunications Commission on May 1, 2000.

In 2019, the CRTC approved an application to add a second transmitter for this station, on 107.1 MHz with an ERP of 920 watts, to address reception difficulties in some portions of the air base.
