= British Block Cairn =

Coordinates: 50.6051°N 110.5875°W

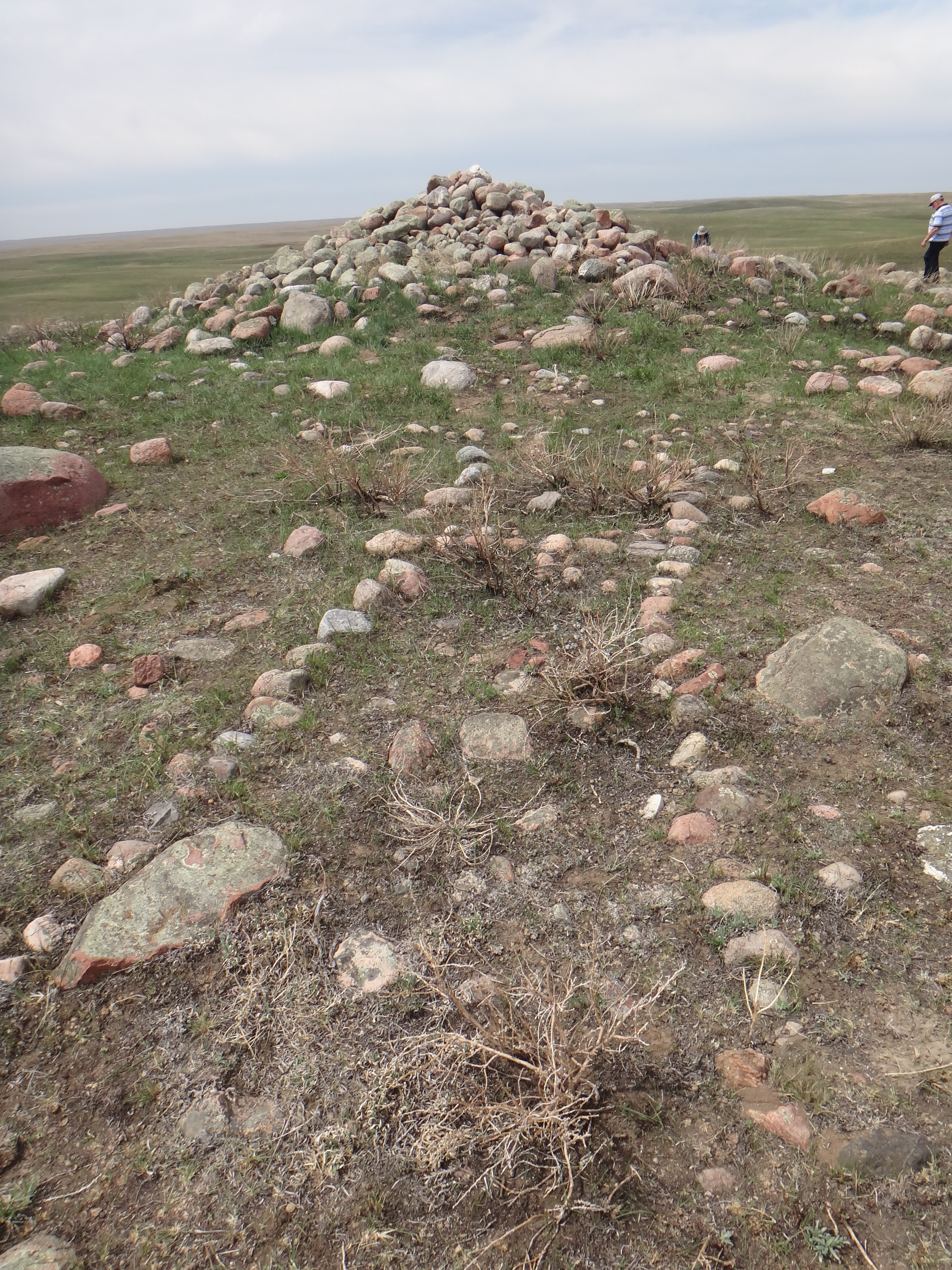
- British Block Cairn
- Location: Cypress County, Alberta, Canada
- Original use: First Nations site
- Website: http://www.historicplaces.ca/en/rep-reg/place-lieu.aspx?id=14944

National Historic Site of Canada
- Designated: 1973

The British Block Cairn (Ed0p-1) is located on the Suffield Block in Alberta, Canada. In the summers of 1961 and 1962, the Chief Superintendent of the Suffield Experimental Station, Mr. A. M. Pennie, granted crews from the Glenbow Foundation, consisting of R.G. Forbis, D. R. King, Frank O'Leary, Kenneth Smith, John Miller, and James Farmilo, access to the cairn. Dating from around 1400 C.E, the site consists of a large boulder cairn surrounded by a ring of stones and a human effigy figure.
