= No. 29 (BATUS) Flight AAC =

Coordinates: 50.2737°N 111.1790°W

29 (BATUS) Flight AAC
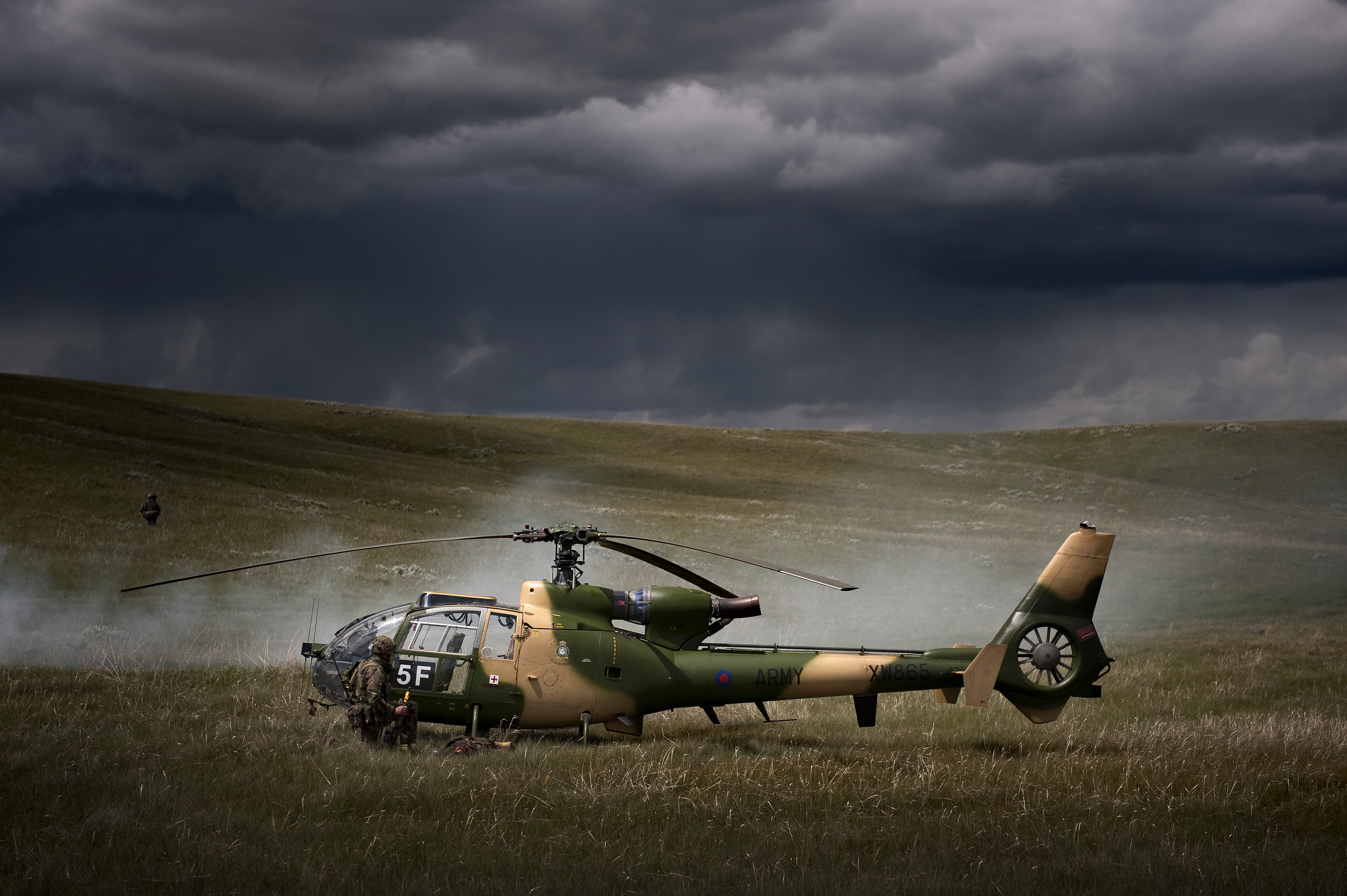
- 29 Flight Gazelle helicopter during a training exercise at BATUS in Canada
- Active: Suspended since October 2021
- Country: United Kingdom
- Branch: British Army
- Size: Flight
- Part of: Army Air Corps
- Base: Canadian Forces Base Suffield

The 29 (BATUS) Flight Army Air Corps was an independent flight within the British Army's Army Air Corps that supported British Army Training Unit Suffield.

The flight has been suspended since 2021.

== History ==
It previously supported the British Army Training Unit Suffield (BATUS).

BATUS conducts major training exercises in the Canadian province of Alberta, at the Canadian Forces Base Suffield. 29 Flight provided aviation support for the training. Its roles included supervision, CASEVAC (casualty evacuation), reconnaissance, liaison and limited lift of passengers and equipment.

The flight last operated Westland Gazelle AH.1 helicopters, until the suspension of the flight in October 2021. The Gazelle helicopter was retired from service in October 2023.

5 Regiment AAC had administrative responsibility for 29 Flight.

The flight was suspended in October 2021, leaving BATUS with no UK aviation support. There are currently fewer than 5 Army Air Corps Regular personnel based at BATUS as of October 2024.

== See also ==
- List of Army Air Corps aircraft units
