= Canadian Society of Microbiologists =

Canadian not-for-profit organization

The Canadian Society of Microbiologists (CSM) is a not-for-profit organization that exists to facilitate the exchange of ideas among microbiologists. It encompasses prokaryotic and eukaryotic microbiology as well as the viruses that infect them. The CSM held its first meeting in Montreal in June 1952, and was officially incorporated in October 1958. The Society is divided into the following three sections: Molecular Genetics and Cellular Microbiology, Applied and Environmental Microbiology and Infection and Immunity.

The CSM holds an annual meeting at various locations across Canada, which comprise oral and poster presentations as well as workshops. The Society also administers and gives out a number of awards at its annual meeting to recognize achievements of researchers at all career stages, as well as travel awards for students and postdocs.
