= Operation Prairie Flat =

Conventional explosive test for nuclear weapon detonations

- Detonation of a 500-short-ton (450 t) spherical surface charge of TNT to evaluate effects of nuclear weapons in the rolling prairie terrain of the test site.

Information
- Country: Canada
- Test site: Defence Research Establishment Suffield, Alberta
- Coordinates: 50°29′5″N 110°41′0″W
- Date: August 9, 1968
- Number of tests: 1
- Agency: Defence Research Board, TTCP
- Explosive: TNT
- Configuration: Stacked sphere
- Yield: 0.5 kilotons of TNT (2.1 TJ)

Test chronology

Operation Prairie Flat was a test involving the detonation of a 500-short-ton (450 t) spherical surface charge of TNT to evaluate airblast, ground shock and thermal effects of nuclear weapons.

Since TNT charges produce roughly double the airburst effect of nuclear weapons, it allowed testing the equivalent of a 1 kiloton of TNT (4.2 TJ) nuclear weapon surface burst. It was a continuation of the technical co-operation (Canada, United States, Great Britain) series of tests sponsored jointly by the respective governments. Similar to previous tests, a large number of projects were carried out simultaneously due to the infrequent opportunity and cost of large explosives tests – the United States alone conducted 39 projects. The resulting airblast also allowed testing various targets at a range of overpressures to verify how structures resist effects of nuclear weapons. These included troop field shelters, fiberglass manholes, foxhole overhead covers, blast valves and electrical generators. Debris fracturing and transport were also tested as part of the effort to understand nuclear blast effects on Nike-X anti-ballistic missile sites. An additional goal of the test was to compare the blast with the previous Distant Plain Event 6 that used an equivalent but smaller 100-short-ton (91 t) configuration in order to study scaling factors.

== Test ==
The test was performed at 11:00 MST on August 9, 1968, at the Watching Hill blast range of the Defence Research Establishment Suffield, a permanent facility able to carry out large high explosive (HE) test up to 500 tons operated by the Defence Research Board. The charge was constructed of 31,676 blocks of TNT of various sizes mainly the 12 by 12 by 4 inches (300 mm × 300 mm × 100 mm) typically used in HE tests. Unlike previous 500-ton tests however, the charge was built as a sphere tangent to the ground, which would make it smaller in diameter than the 500-ton hemispheres but equal in yield. Detonation was accomplished with CE/TNT boosters placed in the center. The sphere was supported by styrofoam rings and blocks and once completed resembled a hemisphere atop a cylinder. After detonation, the flame front reached the charge surface in approximately half a second and produced a fireball and destructive overpressures. Debris up to 3/4 inch (19 mm) in diameter continued to rain down for almost 8 minutes after detonation in the vicinity of ground zero. The resulting crater measuring 270 feet (82 m) across filled rapidly with water and was subsequently excavated for studying the ground effects.
