= CFB Suffield =

CFB Suffield BFC Suffield (French)
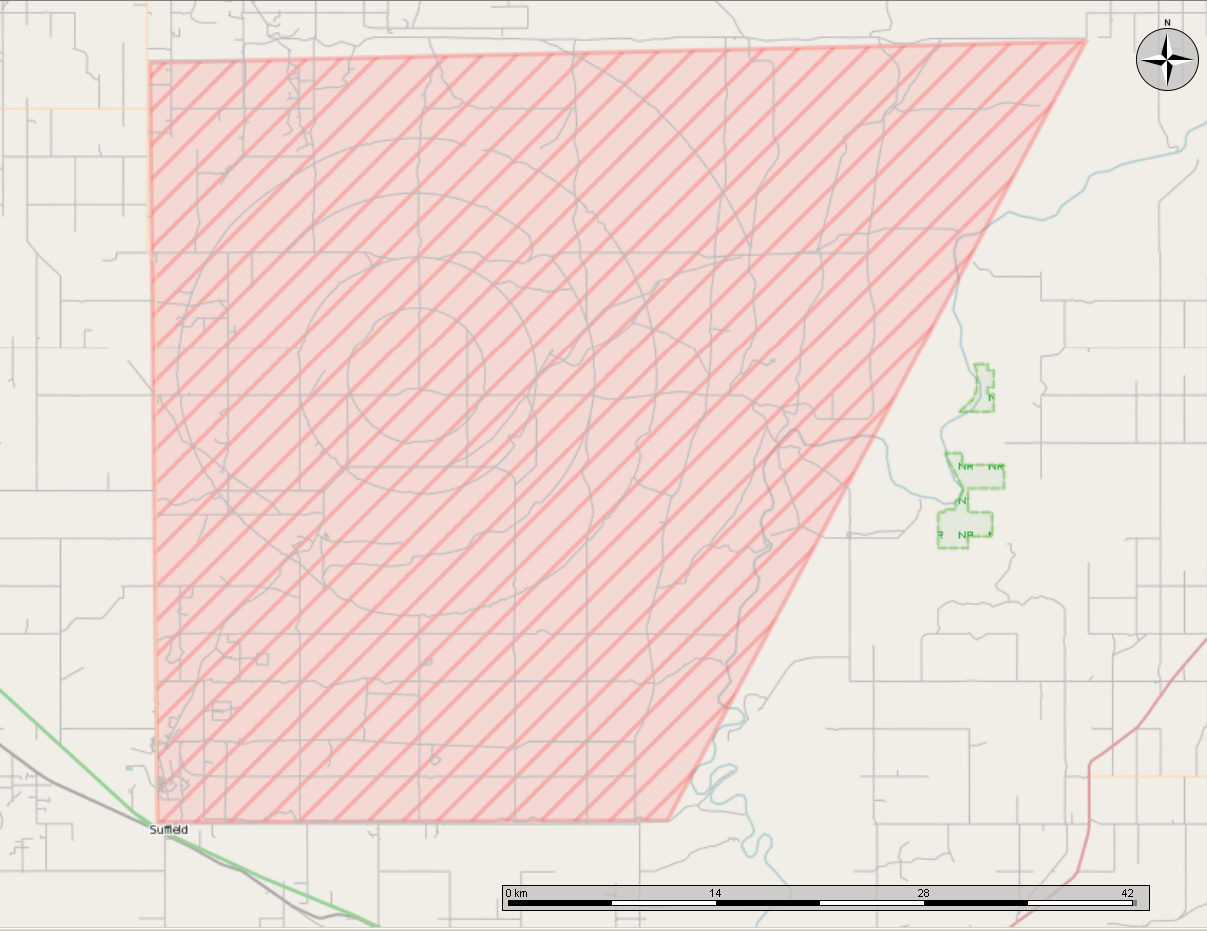
- CFB Suffield in Alberta. The north edge of the base is over 40 km (25 mi) long.

- IATA: YSD; ICAO: CYSD; WMO: 71128

Summary
- Airport type: Military
- Owner: Government of Canada
- Operator: Department of National Defence
- Location: Cypress County, Alberta
- Built: 1971
- Commander: LCol T. Chiasson
- Occupants: Defence Research and Development Canada; British Army Training Unit Suffield
- Time zone: Alberta Time (UTC−06:00)
- Elevation AMSL: 2,525 ft (770 m)
- Coordinates: 50°16′24″N 111°10′30″W
- Website: www.canada.ca/en/army/corporate/3-canadian-division/canadian-forces-base-suffield.html

Map
- Location in Alberta

Helipads
Number	Length		Surface
Number	ft	m	Surface
H1	130 × 375	40 × 114	Concrete
- Source: Canada Flight Supplement; Environment Canada

Canadian Forces Base Suffield (also CFB Suffield, IATA: YSD, ICAO: CYSD) is the largest army training area in Canada. The CFB is in southeastern Alberta, 3 nautical miles (5.6 km; 3.5 mi) north-northwest of Suffield, 50 km (31 mi) northwest of Medicine Hat and 250 km (160 mi) southeast of Calgary. It is accessible via Highway 884, a public road that bisects the main hub section of the base.

The base has its own radio station, CKBF-FM, which airs programming for both the Canadian and British military personnel stationed at the base. The Crown village of Ralston is on base lands.

== History ==
=== Chemical warfare training ===
The lands comprising modern-day CFB Suffield were known as the "Suffield Block", resulting from the Dominion Land Survey, and comprised marginal agricultural land, given the perpetual semi-arid climate. Some settlement was attempted, but during the droughts of the 1920s most farms were abandoned, along with some horses, whose feral descendants formerly roamed the region. The total area measures approximately 2,700 square kilometres (1,000 sq mi) and borders an area north of the South Saskatchewan River.

Following the fall of France to Nazi Germany, the British Army required a new training facility for carrying out experiments in chemical warfare to replace the one it previously used in French Algeria. In 1941, the federal government expropriated the Suffield Block, purchasing the majority of the land from the Canadian Pacific Railway and the Hudson's Bay Company; 452 residents were displaced. Experimental Station Suffield commenced operations on June 11, 1941.

British forces left the joint operation of Suffield to the Canadian Army in 1946. In 1947 the Canadian Army turned operation of Experimental Station Suffield over to the Defence Research Board, now Defence Research and Development Canada. In 1950 the facility was renamed Suffield Experimental Station, and in 1967 it was renamed to Defence Research Establishment Suffield (DRES). Throughout the period from 1947 to 1971, the Canadian Army continued occasional use of the Suffield ranges.

=== RCAF aerodrome ===
In approximately 1942 the aerodrome was listed at 50°16′N 111°11′W with compass variation of 22° east and elevation of 2,540 ft (770 m). One runway was listed as follows:

Runway name	Length	Width	Surface
2/20	4,660 ft (1,420 m)	200 ft (61 m)	Hard surfaced

=== British Army ===
On August 25, 1971, the Canadian Government ratified a ten-year agreement with the British Government that allowed the British Armed Forces to use the northern three-quarters of the Suffield Block for armoured, infantry, and artillery live-fire training. On December 1, 1971, Canadian Forces Base Suffield (CFB Suffield) was officially created and allocated to Mobile Command. Over 160 staff members, 90 buildings, 80 vehicles, and the Crown Village of Ralston were transferred from Defence Research Establishment Suffield to the newly created base and CFB Suffield was co-located with the Research Establishment. By January 1972, the British Army Training Unit Suffield (BATUS) was established and the first live round was fired by a battlegroup from the 4th Royal Tank Regiment (4th RTR) on July 15, 1972.

British Army training has continued at Suffield since 1971, with the shared-use agreement being extended several times (made indefinite in 2006). Regular and reserve units of Canadian Army began to make use of the base beginning in 1991, around the same time as the downgrading of CFB Wainwright. The British Army Training Unit Suffield (BATUS) consists of pool training equipment used by army units rotating through the base on exercises, as well as a training "opposition force" (OPFOR).

In 1996/1997, CFB Suffield had two federal heritage buildings recognized on the Register of the Government of Canada Heritage Buildings: Central Laboratory, Building B-1 and Ralston School.

DRES was merged into a new organization, Defence Research and Development Canada (DRDC), in 2000.

== Defence Research and Development Canada, Suffield ==
Defence Research and Development Canada (DRDC) is an agency of the Canadian Department of National Defence responding to the scientific and technological needs of the Canadian Forces. Its mission is to ensure that the CF remains scientifically and operationally relevant. The agency is made up of eight research laboratories, one of which is DRDC Suffield. DRDC Suffield is the lead laboratory for chemical and biological defence research, as well as in areas generally related to military engineering, mobility systems, and weapons system evaluation.

== Wildlife refuge ==
The decision to designate the Suffield Block a military training facility in 1941 left tens of square kilometres of undisturbed prairie grassland intact from the effects of industrial agriculture. In 1992, the military signed a Memorandum of Understanding with Environment Canada and in 2003 lands along the South Saskatchewan River comprising some 458 square kilometres (177 sq mi) were designated as the Suffield National Wildlife Area.

== See also ==
- British Army Training Unit Suffield
- Defence Research and Development Canada Suffield
- Science and technology in Canada
- Operation LAC
