= British Army Training Unit Suffield =

British Army unit in Suffield, Alberta, Canada

- Suffield, Alberta; Near Medicine Hat
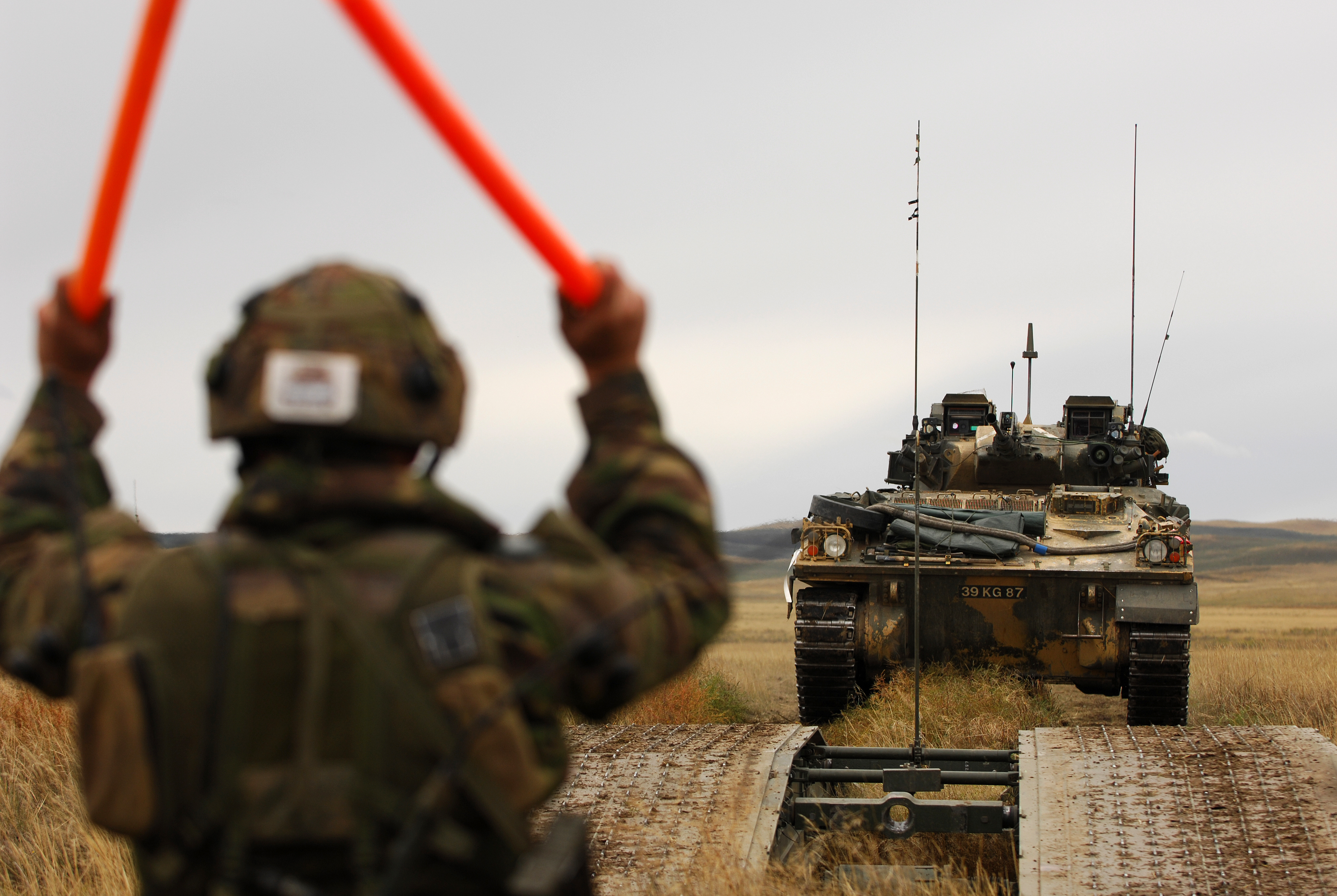
- A member of the Royal Engineers guides a Warrior armoured vehicle over a No. 12 bridge.

Site information
- Type: Training Area
- Owner: Ministry of Defence
- Operator: British Army
- Website: www.army.mod.uk/deployments/canada/

Location
- Location within Alberta
- Coordinates: 50°16′17.7″N 111°09′46.8″W

Site history
- In use: 1971–present

The British Army Training Unit Suffield (BATUS) is a British Army unit located at the vast training area of Canadian Forces Base Suffield near Suffield, Alberta, Canada. BATUS is the British Army's largest armoured training facility, and it can accommodate live-firing and tactical effect simulation (TES) exercises up to battle group level. CFB Suffield is seven times the size of the Salisbury Plain Training Area in England and 19% of the size of Northern Ireland, offering the British Army the ability to conduct large exercises that UK military bases cannot accommodate.

== History ==
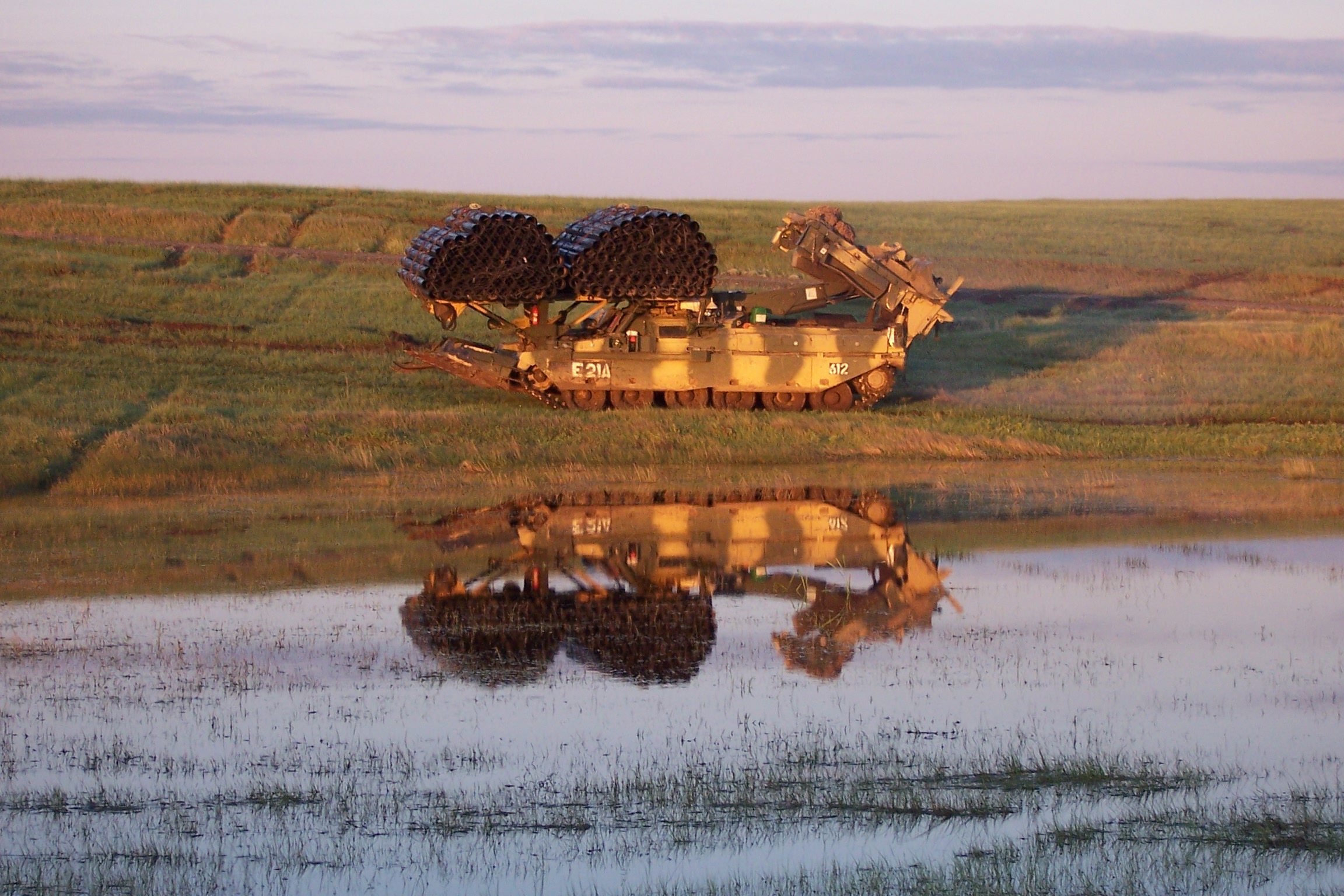
A CHAVRE of the Royal Engineers in Canada in 2005

A British chemical weapons testing facility was located in French-controlled Algeria. However, upon the conquest of France by Germany in 1940, the facility was lost. The British could find no suitable location in the UK, and an agreement was signed between Canada and the UK to allow the Suffield area to become available to British scientists for testing. Consequently, British and Canadian forces employed the area for a variety of experiments. Upon the end of World War II, the British departed the Suffield area and it was formally taken over by the Canadian Defence Research Board.

In 1969, Colonel Gaddafi led a coup in Libya, took control of the country and proceeded, after negotiations, to close down British military installations located at El Adem and Tobruk, and American installations located near Tripoli. This presented the UK with a problem, as there were no areas large enough to allow the British Army to undertake large-scale armoured warfare exercises in Europe. In 1971 a 10-year lease was signed between the British and Canadian governments that authorized battle group training to take place in the Suffield area by the British Army. In January 1972, the British Army Training Unit Suffield was formally established. In July, the first live rounds were fired by the 4th Royal Tank Regiment Battle Group. In 1981, the lease for Suffield was extended, and in 1991, the lease was again extended. In 2006, on the expiration of this lease, the British and Canadian governments concluded an agreement that would allow British forces to maintain their training practices in Canada indefinitely.

Reports in September 2020 suggested that tank training at BATUS could be brought to an end as the Challenger 2 tanks age. Mayor of nearby city Medicine Hat, Ted Clugston (along with local MP Glen Motz) expressed concern about this, saying the base has been a "major economic stabilizing force since the 1970s". A 2007 estimate suggested that the unit injects $100 million into the local economy. In November 2021, reports suggested that the base would be closed in favour of the Omani-British Joint Training Area in Oman, however this was denied by Defence Secretary Ben Wallace who added that the base would see "change" but would not close. The MOD Press Office stated that the base would remain "a vital training base for the British Army".

In October 2021, 29 (BATUS) Flight AAC, which provided range reconnaissance, CASEVAC (casualty evacuation) and limited lift of passengers and equipment to BATUS with Gazelle helicopters, was placed in suspended animation, leaving BATUS with no UK aviation support.

In 2023, all British military assets were removed from Suffield after the UK MOD announced reduction of training areas for the next two years.

As of December 2024, the British Army was not using the base.

In January 2026, Al Carns spoke on Suffield's future, stating that it will depend on the outcome of the Defence Investment Plan (DIP). In February 2026, it was reported that British troops would return to Suffield, in part to conduct research and tests for drones, by Spring 2026.

== Current ==
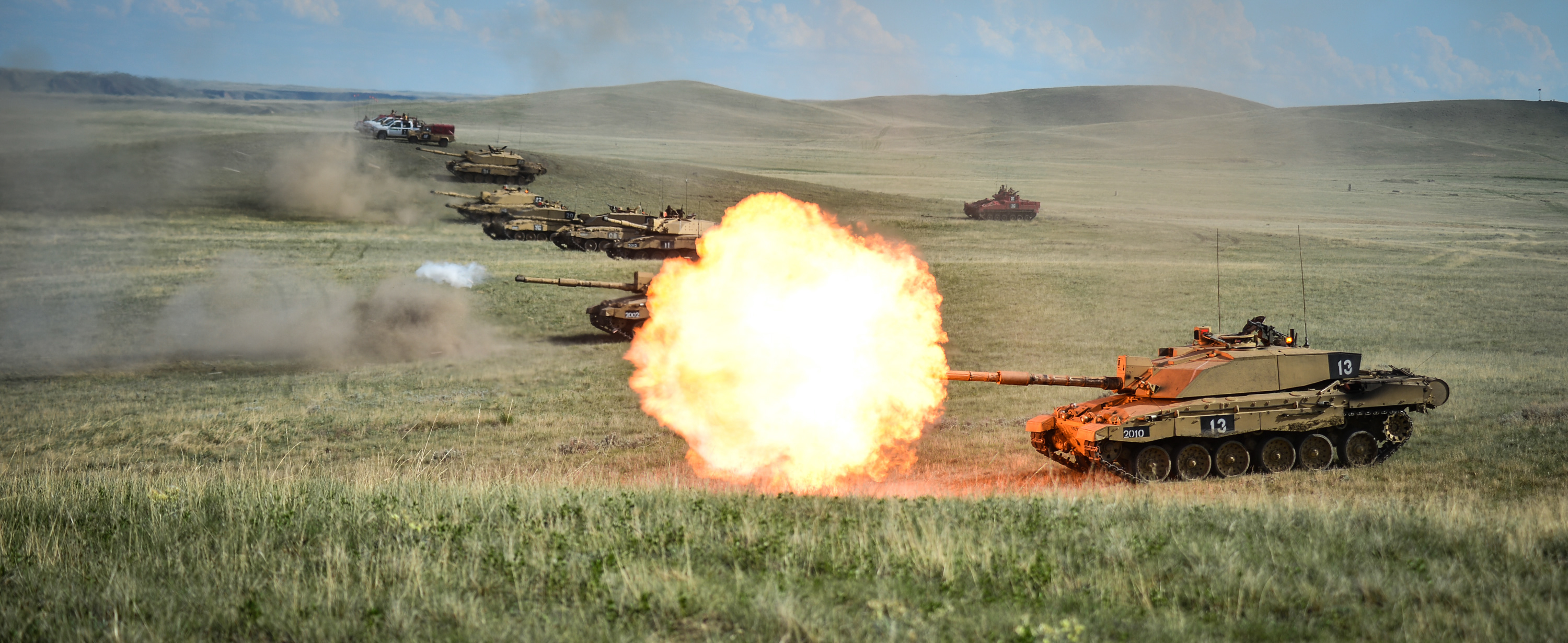
A row of Challenger II on a firing range at BATUS

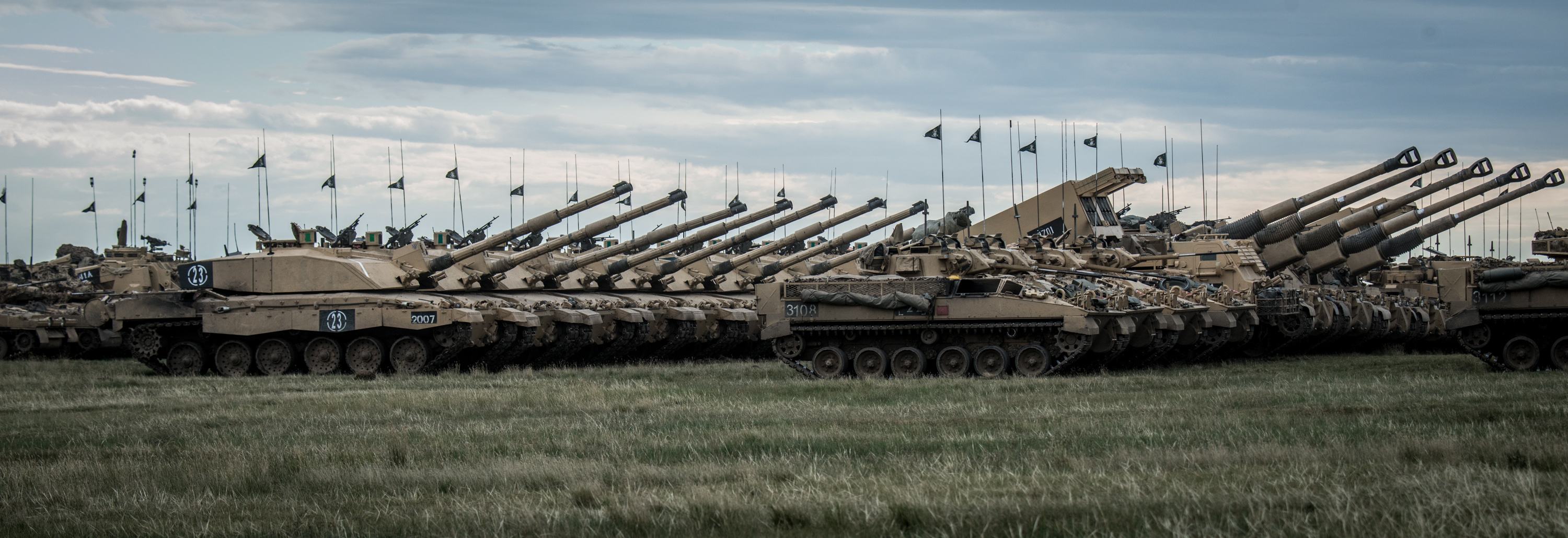
A battlegroup on display at BATUS in 2014

Due to the extremely cold winters, BATUS conducts training from May to October each year. This normally consists of four to six battle groups (BGs) each exercising for around 30–38 days, supported by the BATUS permanent and temporary staff and a dedicated enemy (traditionally provided by a single nominated regiment). There are relatively few service personnel permanently posted to BATUS (229 as of 2019, along with 250 dependent children), but their numbers are significantly increased by temporary staff who form the bulk of the Operations Group (Ops Gp) who design and deliver the most complex live fire and simulated fully instrumented training for Armoured, Infantry and Strike Battlegroups. This, as well a large proportion of the camp-based supporting organisations, including a dedicated logistics squadron and a REME workshop. Permanent postings to BATUS last two years. French-speaking local actors are often hired for exercises, to give soldiers experience of working with non-English-speaking civilians.

A 30-day exercise, Prairie Fire, operates four times a year. It aims to precisely replicate the experience of being transported to a warzone, fighting, and returning to the UK. During the exercise, soldiers fight fictional "Donovians" in "Atropia".

1,400 soldiers and over 1,000 vehicles, including 22 Challenger 2 tanks and 103 Bulldog armoured fighting vehicles (AFVs), are based in BATUS, alongside an undisclosed number of Warrior infantry fighting vehicles (IFVs), AS-90 self-propelled artillery, Trojan combat engineering vehicles, Titan armoured bridge layers and formerly Gazelle helicopters, until their retirement in October 2023 (previously used by 29 (BATUS) Flight AAC).

- Stationed units
  - HQ BATUS
  - Combat Ready Training Centre
  - Resident OPFOR, rotated every year. This is made up of either an armoured regiment or infantry battalion.
  - 105 Logistic Support Squadron, Royal Logistic Corps
  - BATUS REME Workshop

== See also ==
- CFB Suffield
- CFB Wainwright
