= Operation Distant Plain =

Series of non-nuclear explosive and detonable gas tests

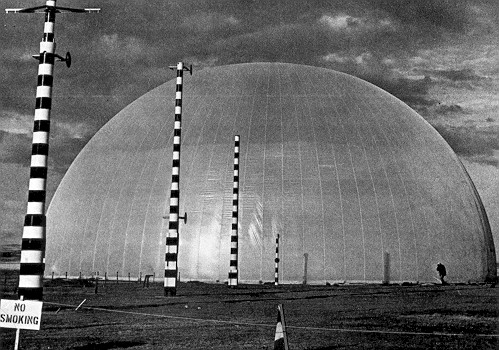
- 125 foot 20-short-ton (18 t) propane-oxygen hemisphere is prepared for detonation as Event 2A. The striped poles carry instrumentation equipment and a human figure can be seen in the lower right.

Information
- Country: Canada
- Test site: Suffield Experimental Station, Alberta; Hinton, Alberta
- Date: July 7, 1966 – August, 1967
- Number of tests: 8
- Agency: Defence Research Board, TTCP
- Explosive: TNT, Detonable Gas
- Configuration: Stacked Sphere (Tower, Buried); Stacked Hemisphere; Gas Balloon; Gas Hemisphere
- Max. yield: 100 tons of TNT (420 GJ)

Test chronology

Operation Distant Plain was a series of non-nuclear explosive and detonable gas tests performed on test sites in Alberta, Canada, during the course of 1966 and 1967. Their purpose was to provide airblast, cratering, and ground shock data in summer and winter conditions for testing new prototype equipment, military targets and coniferous forest blowdown, and defoliation.

Participants included Canada, the United Kingdom, Australia, and the United States under the Tripartite Technical Cooperation Program. Detonable gas balloons were used in this operation in an attempt to find an economical substitute for TNT as well as for the fact that they could be placed at desired heights without a heavy support structure or towers. In addition, they were more adaptable to airblast phenomena and produced a well defined blast wave without perturbation or ejecta; they also produced no crater. However, it was found that they lacked the high pressure associated with high explosives, and difficulties were encountered as the 20-ton gas balloon ruptured and another detonated unexpectedly during inflation. Ultimately ANFO was elected as a lower cost alternative to TNT for non-nuclear explosives tests.

== Tests ==
The following table summarizes the events that took place during the operation in chronological order.

Event	Date	Charge	Yield (short tons)	Height of Burst (feet)	Location	Notes
1	7 July 1966	TNT sphere, tower	20	85	Drowning Ford Test Range, SES	Airblast and induced ground motions
2	July 1966	125 foot methane-oxygen balloon	20	85	Drowning Ford Test Range, SES	Cancelled, balloon ruptured during inflation
2A	22 July 1966	125 foot propane-oxygen hemisphere	20	0	Drowning Ford Test Range, SES	Test feasibility of detonable gas, compare with 20 ton TNT events
3	27 July 1966	TNT sphere, half buried	20	0	Drowning Ford Test Range, SES	Normal environment control for Event 5
4	16 August 1966	TNT Hemisphere	50	0	Edson Forest, 10 miles northwest of Hinton	Coniferous forest blowdown test
2B	October 1966	125 foot methane-oxygen balloon	18.6	63	Drowning Ford Test Range, SES	Rescheduled Event 2, detonated unexpectedly during inflation on ground
5	9 February, 1967	TNT sphere, half buried	20	0	Drowning Ford Test Range, SES	Frozen ground test
6	26 July 1967	TNT sphere, supported	100	0	Watchdog Hill Blast Range, SES	Nuclear weapon surface burst simulation
1A	18 August 1967	TNT sphere, tower	20	30	Watchdog Hill Blast Range, SES	Airblast and induced ground motions, repeat of event 1

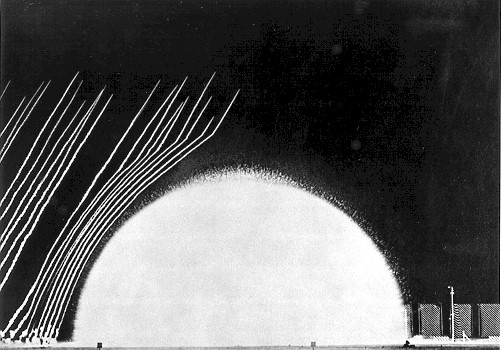
Detonation of 20 tons of propane-oxygen hemisphere in Event 2A. The blast wave can be seen affecting the smoke trails.
