= Suffield Block =

Area in Alberta, Canada

The Suffield Block is an area located within Cypress County, southern Alberta, Canada approximately bounded by Highway 884 on the west, Highway 555 on the north, the South Saskatchewan River on the east and the Trans-Canada Highway on the south. The Suffield Block is managed by CFB Suffield.

== History ==
On 9 April 1941, following discussions between the Province of Alberta and the federal government, the federal government issued an order-in-council that authorized the Department of National Defence (DND) to enter into a lease arrangement for land within the Tilley East area. A matching order-in-council by the Province provided the Minister of Lands and Mines the necessary approvals to execute the leased agreement to the federal government for 99 years at a cost of one dollar per year to support the operation of the Experimental Station Suffield by DND. However, the land to be leased by DND was not vacant. A number of farmers and ranchers held rights to portions of the land by title and lease. Under the agreement, the Alberta Government was to arrange with the owners and leaseholders to vacate the land for financial compensation and land in other areas of the province. DND agreed to provide the Province the funds to obtain the privately held lands at fair market value. The Province sent agents to Medicine Hat to begin negotiations with the landowners. However, it soon became clear that most land holders were not interested in selling their lands for the compensation offered. The Province relayed this information to DND and the Federal Government made the decision to expropriate the land.

All non-Crown held land on the 2,960 km^{2} (1,140 sq mi) area of the Suffield Block was expropriated by the Canadian federal government and included the cancellation of all lease arrangements. The expropriation orders were filed on 31 May 1941 and 8 August 1941 at the South Alberta Land Title Office in the City of Calgary.

Upon the termination of the Second World War, provincial-held lands within the "British Block" (or Suffield Block) were transferred from the province to the federal government in exchange for a large number of army and air camps and buildings from the Dominion government (War Assets Corporation).

The community of Bingville was the largest village affected by the creation of the Block. The name of the community was drawn from a hat which resulted in naming the village after the comic strip Bingville Bugle. The Bingville Bugle was written by humorist Clyde Newton Newkirk as a parody of a hillbilly newsletter complete with gossipy tidbits, minstrel quips, creative spelling, and mock ads. In 1941, a Royal Canadian Mounted Police officer appeared in Bingville, which was not quite an oasis in the desert, but it was a pocket of better land and was graced with a little more rain. Under orders from the federal government, by arrangement with Alberta, the Mountie bade the settlers to decamp within 30 days. William Alfred Pratt, a trustee of the Bingville School, was one of the local farmers who had their property expropriated in the creation of the Block.

Brutus and Tripole were other communities within the Suffield Block. Learmouth, Bemister and Kalbeck are place names along the Hanna – Medicine Hat Canadian Northern Railway grade within the Suffield Block that was never completed.

Two national historic sites of Canada are on the Suffield Block. The British Block Cairn National Historic Site is one of the best examples of a large boulder cairn and an important example of Niitsitapi cultural heritage. The Suffield Tipi Rings National Historical Site preserves a dense concentration of tipi rings.

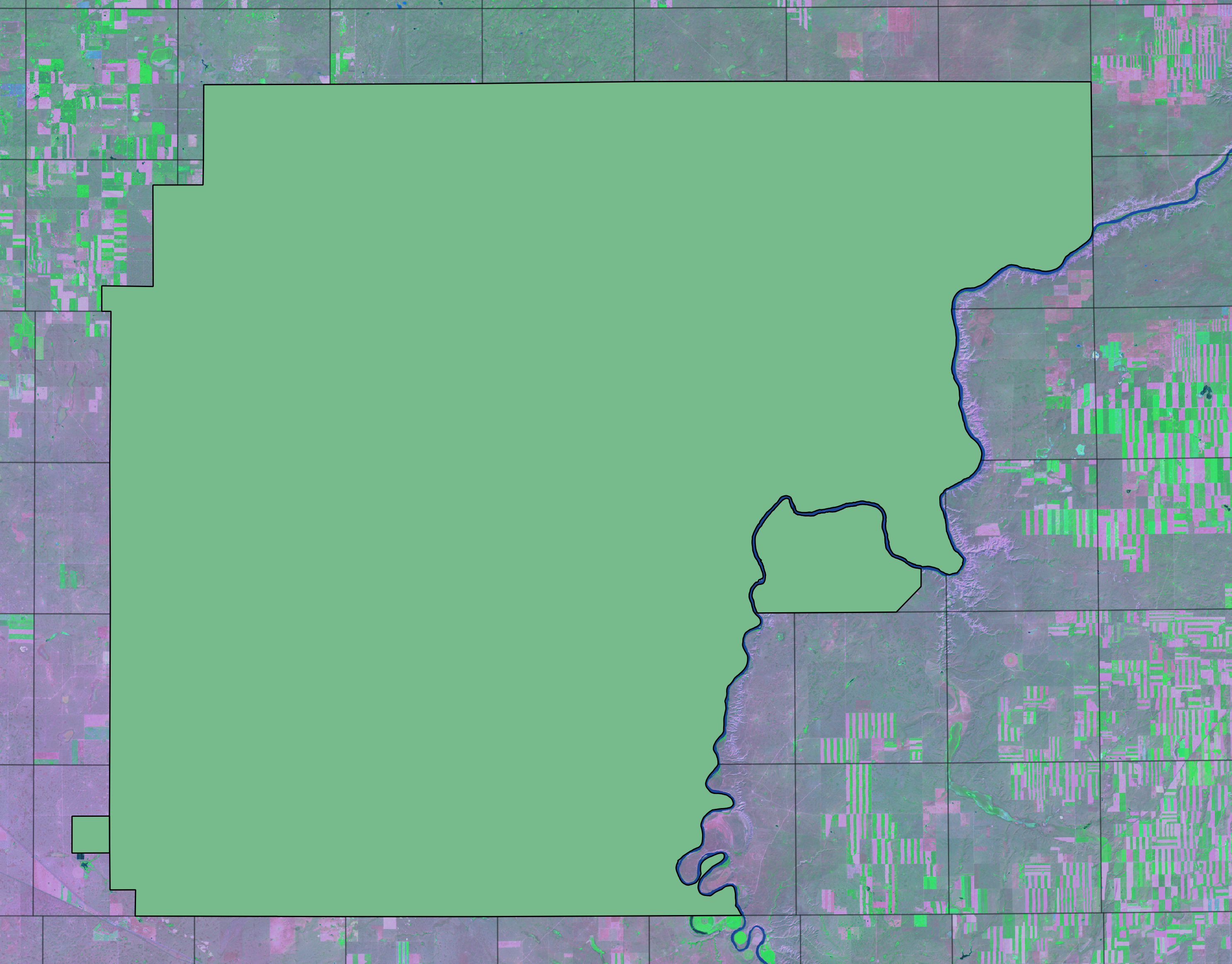
The outline of the Suffield Block was traced from a Landsat 7 images. The background Landsat 7 image is "© Department of Natural Resources Canada. All rights reserved" and is available for use under the "Geogratis Licence Agreement For Unrestricted Use Of Digital Data". The outline includes the main base area of CFB Suffield and the Crown Village of Ralston.

== Named regions ==
Name	Event	Conflict
Amiens	Battle of Amiens	First World War
Batoche	Battle of Batoche	North-West Rebellion
Caen	Battle for Caen	Second World War
Cambrai	The 2nd Battle of Cambrai	First World War
Casa Berardi	Assault at Casa Berardi, part of the Moro River Campaign	Second World War
Coriano	The battle for Coriano Ridge	Second World War
Dieppe	Dieppe Raid	Second World War
Fish Creek	Battle of Fish Creek	North-West Rebellion
Hochwald	The battle of the Hochwald	Second World War
Kap Yong	Battle of Kapyong	Korean War
Koomati	Part of the Battle of Leliefontein	Second Anglo-Boer War
Liri	The battle in the Liri Valley	Second World War
Lundy's Lane	Battle of Lundy's Lane	War of 1812
Mons	Liberation of Mons	First World War
Moreuilwood	Battle of Moreuil Wood	First World War
Ortona	Battle of Ortona	Second World War
Paardeberg	Battle of Paardeberg	Second Anglo-Boer War
Queenston	Battle of Queenston Heights	War of 1812
Ypres	Second Battle of Ypres	First World War

Additional names not associated with a military event: AEC Oil Access Area, Owl, Eagle, Lark, Hawk and Falcon.

On 19 June 2003, the Suffield National Wildlife Area (SNWA) was created and comprises the Amiens, Ypres, Casa Berardi and Fish Creek regions of the Suffield Block.

== Alberta Homestead maps (circa 1918) ==
Township 17 & 18 — Range 7, 8 & 9 — Brutus, Bingville, Tripola, Kalbeck, Sinensen

Township 17 & 18 — Range Range 4, 5 & 6 — Along the S. Saskatchewan River

Township 15 & 16 — Range 7, 8 & 9 — Learmouth, Bemister

Township 15 & 16 — Range Range 4, 5 & 6 — Along the Saskatchewan River

Township 13 & 14 — Range 7, 8 & 9 — Stair, Bowell, Dennis, Suffield

Township 13 & 14 — Range 4, 5 & 6 — Bowmanton, Cousins, Redcliff
