= Suffield, Alberta =

Community in Alberta, Canada

Suffield
- Hamlet
- Location of Suffield in Alberta
- Coordinates: 50°13′06″N 111°09′40″W
- Country: Canada
- Province: Alberta
- Region: Southern Alberta
- Census division: 1
- Municipal district: Cypress County

Area (2021)
  - Land: 0.86 km^{2} (0.33 sq mi)
- Elevation: 755 m (2,477 ft)

Population (2021)
  - Total: 190
  - Density: 219.8/km^{2} (569/sq mi)
- Time zone: UTC−06:00 (Alberta Time)
- Postal code span: T0J
- Area code: +1-403

Suffield is a hamlet in southern Alberta, Canada within Cypress County. It is located on the Trans-Canada Highway (Highway 1) approximately 32 km (20 mi) northwest of Medicine Hat, and just south of CFB Suffield.

== History ==
Established by the Canadian Pacific Railway (CPR) in 1884, Suffield was named after Charles Harbord, 5th Baron Suffield who married in 1854, Cecilia Annetta, the sister of Edward Baring, 1st Baron Revelstoke, who assisted in financing the railway.

Near the beginning of the 20th century, Suffield experienced rapid growth arising from the construction of the CPR. One of the larger buildings in the area at the time, the 32-room Alamo Hotel was constructed in 1910 by W.R. Martin, superintendent of CPR oil and gas exploration, A.M. Grace, chief engineer of the Southern Alberta Land Company, and A.P. Phillips at a cost of $30,000. A reporter from the Medicine Hat News wrote on 20 Oct 1910, "The most beautiful hotel alongside the CPR from Winnipeg to Calgary, stands on the prairie within a stone's throw of one of the biggest gas wells in the Medicine Hat district in what promises to be, in the near future, the city of Suffield". The hotel hosted a 40-foot stand-up bar and was reported to be one of the finest in the country. Hard times hit with the First World War and with the introduction of Prohibition in 1915. In 1926, the hotel was sold to the Calgary Brewing and Malting Company and moved to Sylvan Lake in 1927 to replace a hotel that burnt down.

=== Railway ===
In 1913, a branch line of the CPR was constructed between Suffield and Retlaw. In 1914, the Suffield-Retlaw was extended to Lomond, completing the 84-mile branch. The Suffield-Lomond line was extended to Arrowwood in 1925. In 1930, the line was extended to Eltham on the Kipp-Aldersyde line near Blackie. The stops on the line were Suffield, Agatha, Hlingworth, Ronolane, Cecil, Armelgra, Scope, Grantham, Vauxhall, Retlaw, Enchant, Travers, Lomond, Armada, Pageant, Milo, Qeenstown, Shouldice and Arrowwood. The coach fare in 1948 was $3.75. The line has since been abandoned and the rails removed.

== Climate ==
Suffield experiences a semi-arid climate (Köppen climate classification BSk) with long, cold, dry winters and short but very warm summers. Precipitation is low, with an annual average of 318 mm, and is concentrated in the warmer months.

Climate data for Suffield Airport
Month	Jan	Feb	Mar	Apr	May	Jun	Jul	Aug	Sep	Oct	Nov	Dec	Year
Record high humidex	12.2	16.1	22.9	28.9	33.3	38.4	44.1	40.4	37.1	29.4	22.2	12.8	44.1
Record high °C (°F)	16.6 (61.9)	21.6 (70.9)	24.4 (75.9)	30.1 (86.2)	33.9 (93.0)	36.5 (97.7)	38.3 (100.9)	40.6 (105.1)	36.1 (97.0)	32.1 (89.8)	23.6 (74.5)	16.7 (62.1)	40.6 (105.1)
Mean daily maximum °C (°F)	−5.9 (21.4)	−1.7 (28.9)	4.7 (40.5)	13.2 (55.8)	19.0 (66.2)	23.3 (73.9)	26.6 (79.9)	26.2 (79.2)	20.0 (68.0)	13.5 (56.3)	2.6 (36.7)	−3.7 (25.3)	11.5 (52.7)
Daily mean °C (°F)	−11.2 (11.8)	−7.1 (19.2)	−1.2 (29.8)	6.3 (43.3)	12.0 (53.6)	16.3 (61.3)	19.1 (66.4)	18.6 (65.5)	12.7 (54.9)	6.6 (43.9)	−2.8 (27.0)	−9 (16)	5.0 (41.0)
Mean daily minimum °C (°F)	−16.4 (2.5)	−12.5 (9.5)	−7.1 (19.2)	−0.7 (30.7)	4.9 (40.8)	9.2 (48.6)	11.6 (52.9)	10.9 (51.6)	5.3 (41.5)	−0.3 (31.5)	−8.2 (17.2)	−14.2 (6.4)	−1.5 (29.3)
Record low °C (°F)	−42.2 (−44.0)	−40.2 (−40.4)	−40 (−40)	−24.4 (−11.9)	−9.4 (15.1)	−2.8 (27.0)	1.7 (35.1)	−1 (30)	−7.8 (18.0)	−29.6 (−21.3)	−36 (−33)	−45.6 (−50.1)	−45.6 (−50.1)
Record low wind chill	−54.1	−51.2	−45.9	−34.4	−14.7	−2.3	1.7	−1.1	−12.8	−22.6	−44	−55.3	−55.3
Average precipitation mm (inches)	15.6 (0.61)	10.1 (0.40)	18.1 (0.71)	23.6 (0.93)	44.5 (1.75)	58.3 (2.30)	34.4 (1.35)	34.0 (1.34)	31.6 (1.24)	15.8 (0.62)	14.7 (0.58)	17.8 (0.70)	318.2 (12.53)
Average rainfall mm (inches)	0.6 (0.02)	0.2 (0.01)	3.5 (0.14)	14.8 (0.58)	41.8 (1.65)	58.3 (2.30)	34.4 (1.35)	33.7 (1.33)	30.2 (1.19)	10.3 (0.41)	2.7 (0.11)	0.7 (0.03)	231.0 (9.09)
Average snowfall cm (inches)	17.2 (6.8)	11.5 (4.5)	16.3 (6.4)	9.7 (3.8)	2.8 (1.1)	0 (0)	0 (0)	0.4 (0.2)	1.4 (0.6)	6.3 (2.5)	14.2 (5.6)	19.6 (7.7)	99.4 (39.1)
Average precipitation days (≥ 0.2 mm)	7.8	5.9	6.9	7.3	9.5	10.9	9.4	8.3	7.7	5.7	6.2	8.0	93.8
Average rainy days (≥ 0.2 mm)	0.40	0.40	1.6	5.1	9.2	10.9	9.4	8.3	7.4	4.2	1.4	0.66	59.0
Average snowy days (≥ 0.2 cm)	7.7	5.9	6.1	3.4	0.93	0	0	0.03	0.40	2.3	5.5	7.8	40.0
Mean monthly sunshine hours	106.9	131.9	180.0	223.0	267.0	292.8	329.3	295.1	214.0	179.3	117.6	89.9	2,426.7
Source: Environment Canada

== Demographics ==
In the 2021 Census of Population conducted by Statistics Canada, Suffield had a population of 190 living in 81 of its 91 total private dwellings, a change of −25.5% from its 2016 population of 255. With a land area of 0.86 km^{2} (0.33 sq mi), it had a population density of 220.9/km^{2} (572.2/sq mi) in 2021.

As a designated place in the 2016 Census of Population conducted by Statistics Canada, Suffield had a population of 255 living in 113 of its 127 total private dwellings, a change of −3.4% from its 2011 population of 264. With a land area of 0.86 km^{2} (0.33 sq mi), it had a population density of 296.5/km^{2} (768.0/sq mi) in 2016.

== See also ==
- British Army Training Unit Suffield
- Canadian Forces Base Suffield
- List of communities in Alberta
- List of designated places in Alberta
- List of former urban municipalities in Alberta
- List of hamlets in Alberta
