= Suffield Experimental Station =

Coordinates: 50°16′16.83″N 111°10′23.39″W

The military research facility located 5 km (3.1 mi) north of Suffield, Alberta, operated under the name of the Suffield Experimental Station (SES) from 1950 to its renaming to the Defence Research Establishment Suffield in 1967.

== History ==
=== Experimental Station Suffield ===
The military research facility located 5 km (3.1 mi) north of Suffield, Alberta, operated under the name of Experimental Station Suffield (or the Field Experimental Station) from its inception into 1941 to its renaming to the Suffield Experimental Station in 1950.

When France fell to the Axis powers in 1940, the British lost access to the joint British/French experimental station located in the Sahara at Beni Ounif, two hundred miles south of Oran. Following the loss of the Algerian experimental station, the Canadian Government indicated that it was willing to provide an alternative location. In October 1940, the Superintendent of Experiments at Porton Down, England, Mr. E. Ll. Davies, arrived in Canada to discuss the issue with Lt. Colonel Morrison and Dr. Otto Maass. Of the sites considered; Tracadie NB, Northern Quebec, Northern Ontario, Brandon, Manitoba, and Maple Creek, Saskatchewan; Suffield, Alberta was selected. The area, which was given the name the Suffield Block, contained one hundred and twenty-five farms plus additional lands that were mostly owned by the Canadian Pacific Railway and the Hudson's Bay Company. A small nucleus of British scientists arrived at the experimental station in the spring of 1941.

Experimental Station Suffield, under the administration of the Canadian Army, commenced operations on June 11, 1941, as a joint British/Canadian biological and chemical defence facility. The name appears on several reports from the period and was most likely following a British naming convention. The research activities of the Station are described in John Bryden's "Deadly Allies".By the end of the Second World War, the station employed 584 personnel trained in chemistry, physics, meteorology, mathematics, pharmacology, pathology, bacteriology, physiology, entomology, veterinary science, mechanical and chemical engineering. In 1946, the station was placed completely in the hands of the Canadian Army when the British withdrew their support. The responsibility for administrating the station, including the Suffield Block, was transferred to the Defence Research Board on April 30, 1947, by Order in Council PC 101/1727. In August 1950, the station was renamed to the Suffield Experimental Station (SES).

| Chief Superintendent | Tenure |
|---|---|
| E.Ll. Davies | 1941 to 1947 |

A note on the Defence Research Board: Based on the recommendations of Dr. Solandt, Director General of Defence Research, an Order in Council was signed on October 17, 1946, that created the Interim Defence Research Board. The four interim board members were Dr. C. H. Best, Dr. Otto Maass, Dr. P. E. Gagnon, and Colonel R. D. Harkness with Dr. Solandt as the chairman. The first meeting was held on December 16, 1946. On March 28, 1947, Bill 19, which amended the National Defence Act of 1927, became law and legally established the Defence Research Board.

A note on the joint British/Australian "Australian Field Experimental Station (AFES)": AFES was constructed at Gunyarra, a railway siding about 12 miles south of Proserpine, Queensland, in 1944. AFES was established to continue the research and experimental work carried out by the Australian Chemical Warfare Research and Experimental Section (A.C.W.R. & E.S.) at Innisfail, Queensland, in 1943/44. Activities at this Station continued until the end of the war. For some time it was placed in a care and maintenance situation but was finally dismantled.

=== SES ===
Control of Experimental Station Suffield was transferred from the Canadian Army to the Defence Research Board (DRB) on April 30, 1947 by Order in Council PC 101/1727. In August 1947, approval was given for the construction of 60 prefabricated housing units at a site named after the James Ralston. Due to delays, major construction did not complete until 1953.

Suffield Experimental Station came into official existence when Experimental Station Suffield was renamed in August 1950. The station was responsible for the administration and operation of the 2690 square kilometre Suffield Block. The DRB's annual report for 1951 listed various major construction projects in progress at station: Shopping and Recreation Centre, Transport Garage, CMHC Housing (76 homes), the Ralston School (a Recognized Federal Heritage Building), and a Fire Hall. The designs for the Central Laboratory were to be completed by December, 1951. On September 29, 1955, the Central Laboratory (Building 1) was opened by Major General William M. Creasy, Commanding General, U.S. Army Chemical Corps and is now a Recognized Federal Heritage Building. In July 1967, the Suffield Experimental Station was renamed to the Defence Research Establishment Suffield (DRES).

| Chief Superintendent | Tenure |
|---|---|
| Dr. H. M. Barrett | 1947 to fall 1949 |
| Dr. E. A. Perren | fall 1949 to 1951 |
| Dr. H. M. Barrett | 1951 to 1952 |
| Dr. G. O. Langstroth | 1952 to Sept 1957 |
| Mr. A. M. Pennie | Sept 1957 to ? |
| Mr. E. J. Bobyn | September 1964 To 1968 |

== Large explosive events ==
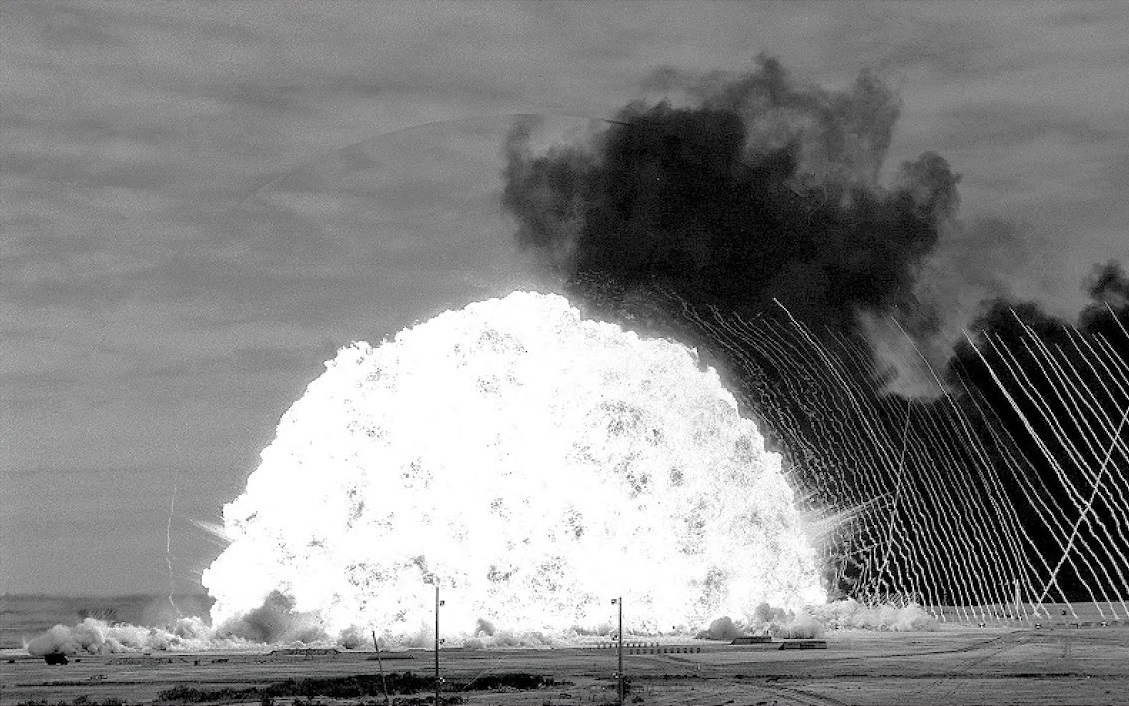
Detonation of a spherical surface charge of 454 metric tonnes of TNT to assess the effects of nuclear weapons at the Suffield Experimental Station in Alberta on July 17, 1964.

- A 100-ton detonation occurred on 3 August 1961
- The Snowball 500-ton detonation (hemisphere form) on 17 July 1964 formed an 87-meter diameter crater
- The Distant Plain series of explosive and detonable gas tests up to 100 tons from July 1966 to August 1967
- The Prairie Flat 500-ton detonation (spherical form)

These experiments were meant to simulate and study nuclear weapon detonation effects including airblast, ground shock, cratering and effects on military targets.
