= Defence Research and Development Canada =

Canadian government agency

- Recherche et développement pour la défense Canada

Agency overview
- Formed: April 1947
- Preceding Agency: National Research Council of Canada
- Type: military science and technology research
- Jurisdiction: Government of Canada
- Headquarters: Ottawa, Ontario
- Employees: 1,400
- Agency executive: Jaspinder Komal, Chief Executive Officer and Assistant Deputy Minister (Science and Technology)
- Parent department: Department of National Defence
- Key document: Amendment to National Defence Act, 1927
- Website: www.canada.ca/en/defence-research-development.html

Defence Research and Development Canada (DRDC; French: Recherche et développement pour la défense Canada, RDDC) is the science and technology organization of the Department of National Defence (DND), whose purpose is to provide the Canadian Armed Forces (CAF), other government departments, and public safety and national security communities with knowledge and technology.

DRDC has approximately 1,400 employees across seven research centres within Canada.

== History ==
After the First World War, national research and development in Canada was organized under the National Research Council (NRC). The NRC was founded in 1925 based on a wartime British recommendation to establish military laboratories in Canada, but by that time the main priorities were developing domestic university and industrial research and civilian projects. Greater interest in military applied research arrived in 1935 when Major-General Andrew McNaughton became President of the NRC. In the period before the Second World War, the NRC undertook research in radar, aviation medicine, artillery, aircraft, gas masks, and metallic magnesium production. Chalmers Jack Mackenzie became acting President at the onset of the Second World War when McNaughton assumed an operational command within the Canadian Army, formally succeeding McNaughton in 1944.

Following the fall of France in June 1940, the NRC assumed control of all Canadian scientific research and became responsible for applying it toward military applications. Laboratories and facilities were established by the NRC and the Canadian Armed Forces; biological and chemical warfare laboratories cooperated closely with Allied counterparts.

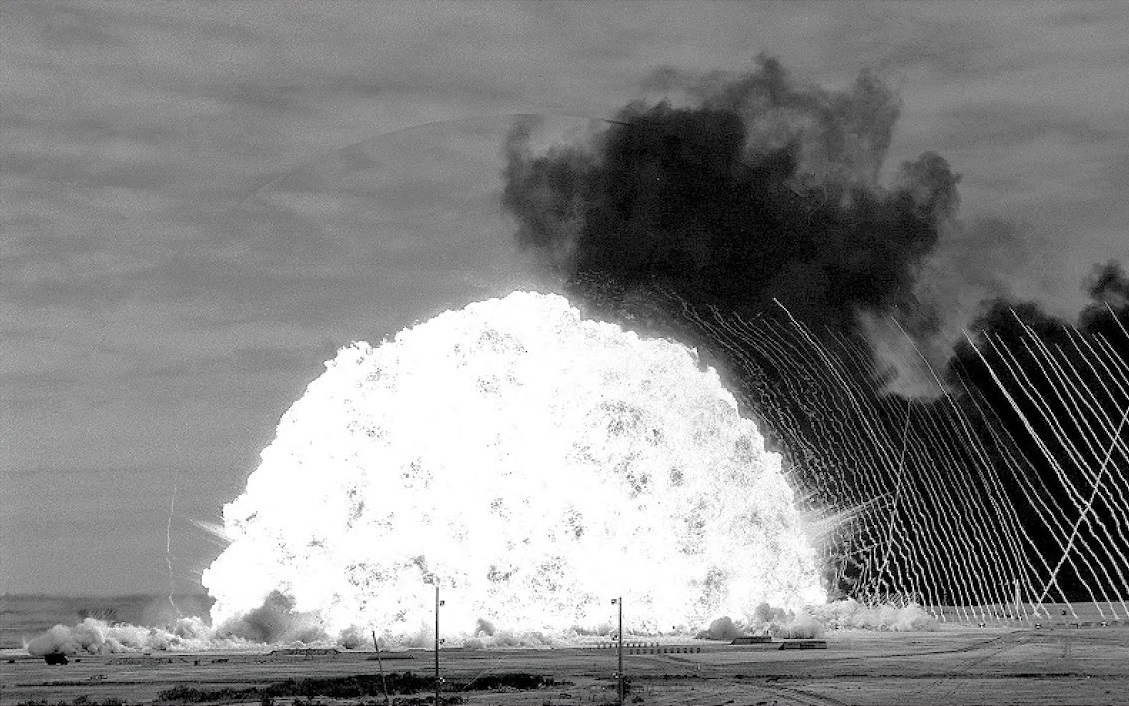
Detonation of a spherical surface charge of 454 metric tonnes of TNT to assess the effects of nuclear weapons at the Suffield Experimental Station in Alberta on 17 July 1964

In 1944, Chalmers Mackenzie and the armed forces began considering the issue of post-war military research, and concluded that a separate military research organization was required. The result was the creation of the Defence Research Board (DRB) within the Department of National Defence (DND) in April 1947, which took over coordinating defence research from the NRC and advising DND on scientific matters. The overall organization of defence research continued to mimic the NRC. The DRB was—as envisioned by proposals in 1945—an interim solution; creating an organization within DND required minimal political action compared to creating a new government department that would subsume both the NRC and defence research. Omond Solandt was the first Chairman of the DRB. The DRB received seven existing NRC facilities.

The DRB also funded university research. In 1951 it gave Donald O. Hebb a secret grant, designated X-38, for sensory isolation experiments at McGill University, following a meeting on Soviet "brainwashing" in Montreal attended by Canadian, American and British officials. From 1959 to 1974 it funded John Zubek's isolation laboratory at the University of Manitoba.

The DRB was the last part of DND to adapt to the unification of the Canadian Armed Forces of 1968. DRB began transitioning to the new structure in 1974, and dissolved in 1977. Six of the seven DRB research establishments were transferred to the newly created Defence Research and Development Branch (DRDB) of the Canadian Armed Forces (CAF).

In the 1990s, budget cuts and the complexity of greater reliance on cheaper contracting drove a review of the organization of defence research. In 2000, the DRDB was replaced by Defence Research and Development Canada (DRDC) which was–like the DRB before–a DND agency.

== Research centres ==
=== Atlantic Research Centre ===
Located in Halifax, Nova Scotia, the Atlantic Research Centre conducts research and development activities related to the maritime defence and security domains, but also to the air and land environments. The Centre traces its formation to 1944 when it was established as the Defence Research Establishment Atlantic (DREA) by the Royal Canadian Navy. DREA was one of the originating organizations that came together in 1947 to form the Defense Research Board which later became DRDC.

The Centre provides expertise in the following areas:

- antisubmarine warfare
- mine and torpedo defence
- shipboard command and control
- naval platform technology
- emerging materials
- signature management
- maritime information and knowledge management
- virtual platforms and virtual combat systems

The Atlantic centre also operates two materials laboratories in the CFB Halifax and Esquimalt Dockyards, which provide scientific consulting and troubleshooting services to the Canadian Armed Forces (primarily the Royal Canadian Navy) on chemical, metallurgical, and engineering problems that affect the operational capability of military vehicles and equipment.

=== Valcartier Research Centre ===
Founded in 1945 as the Canadian Armament Research and Development Establishment (CARDE), it became Defence Research Establishment Valcartier (DREV) in the early 1970s, and finally DRDC Valcartier (French: RDDC Valcartier) on 1 April 2000. Valcartier research and development activities support the operational needs of the Canadian Armed Forces in defence and security.

The Centre provides expertise in the following areas:

- Vehicle and Personnel Protection Systems
- Weapon Systems
- Command, Control, and Intelligence systems
- Cyber Security
- Spectral and Geospatial Exploitation
- Tactical Surveillance and Reconnaissance
- Electro-Optical Warfare

Located just outside CFB Valcartier, it is the largest of the research centres.

=== Ottawa Research Centre ===
Originally known as the Defence Research Establishment Ottawa (DREO), DRDC Ottawa is located near Shirleys Bay in the west end of Ottawa. The Ottawa Research Centre develops technologies in support of the following domains:

- Space Systems and Technology
- Cyber Operations
- Communication and Signals Warfare
- Incoherent Scatter Radar (ISR) applications
- Radar Sensing Exploitation
- Radar Electronic Warfare
- Radiological Nuclear Defence
- Navigation Warfare

=== Toronto Research Centre ===
The Toronto Research Centre conducts research and development activities to enhance the effectiveness and ensure the health and safety of military personnel in operational environments. The Centre also houses the Canadian Forces Environmental Medicine Establishment, which supports the operational needs of the Canadian Armed Forces through research, tests, and evaluations as well as training in undersea and aerospace environments. The Research Centre provides expertise in the following areas:

- aerospace and undersea life support systems
- human protection and performance in stressful environments
- individual behaviour and performance
- military medicine
- research related to human factors and ergonomics, including simulation and modelling in complex military systems
- social and cultural factors influencing behaviour
- team performance and collaborative behaviour

==== Research examples ====
- Decompression Tables (DCIEM Sport Diving Tables) that are now used worldwide and have been adopted by foreign navies, commercial diving companies, and civilian organizations to reduce the risk of decompression illness, once commonly called "the bends."
- Canadian Underwater Mine-Countermeasures Apparatus (CUMA) is a new diver mine-countermeasure (MCM) diving set with a depth capability of 80 metres, as well as being anti-acoustic and anti-magnetic.
- The STInG (Sustained Tolerance to INcreased G) system, which provides G protection for pilots, superior to any current operational system.
- Virtual reality simulator for helicopter deck landing to simulate the dangerous task of landing a helicopter on the moving deck of a ship.
- Clothe the Soldier project provided human engineering support to the Army's acquisition of over 24 new items of state-of-the-art soldier protective clothing and personal equipment.
- Load Carriage Robot – an instrumented articulated manikin that mimics the movement of the human torso.
- A Cold Exposure Survival Model (CESM) used in Search and Rescue (SAR) Operations.
- A Heat Stress Calculator for firefighters used throughout Ontario.
- The New Wind Chill Equivalent Temperature Chart, used throughout North America.

=== Suffield Research Centre ===
Located in Alberta, the DRDC Suffield Research Centre is a Canadian centre of excellence for chemical and biological defence and has research programs in blast, casualty management, and autonomous systems. The centre’s work feeds into the combined national effort to keep Canada and the Canadian Armed Forces (CAF) safe from the devastating consequences chemical (C), biological (B), radiological (R), nuclear (N), and explosive (E) threats could have on human health, the environment, and major infrastructure.

DRDC operations in Suffield include two unique national assets: Experimental Proving Ground (EPG) and the Counter Terrorism and Technology Centre (CTTC). The EPG is Canada’s only proving ground of its kind for military research and development. Its immense land space (470 km^{2}), air space, and 105 realty assets (specialized laboratories, trial sites and facilities) make it a research and development resource to advance DRDC/DND’s program. It is also accessible to defence industry partners upon request. CTTC offers realistic training (over 2,200 CAF and First Responders per year) helping them respond safely and effectively to incidents involving CBRNE threats.

The centre provides expertise in the following areas:

- C/B detection & forensics;
- C/B protection technologies and systems;
- Blast threat mitigation and assessment;
- Advanced energetics;
- Medical countermeasures;
- Modelling and analysis of threats;
- Equipment evaluation and testing;
- Casualty management/blast injury research;
- Autonomous systems operations (ground and air); and,
- CBRNE Defence Training

=== Centre for Operational Research and Analysis (CORA) ===
The Centre for Operational Research and Analysis (CORA) was originally made up of various Defence Operational Research directorates (DLOR for Land, DMOR for Maritime, DAOR for Air, DStratA for Strategic, etc.). CORA provides scientific rigour to decision support and option analysis to the Department of National Defence, the Canadian Armed Forces, and Canadian security partners. The centre delivers options, recommendations, and potential outcomes to key decision makers by providing timely quantitative and qualitative analysis reports and objective expert advice.

=== Director General Military Personnel Research and Analysis (DGMPRA) ===
Director General Military Personnel Research and Analysis (DGMPRA) responds to the research needs of both the Assistant Deputy Minister (Science and Technology) and the Chief of Military Personnel within the Department of National Defence. The Centre conducts strategic and operational research in the areas of:

- personnel generation
- personnel and family support
- operational and organizational dynamics

The Centre also has research capabilities in the following areas:

- modelling and analysis
- forecasting
- surveys, focus groups, and interviews
- strategic analysis
- concept development
- secondary data analysis
- data mining
- benchmarking
- geographic information systems
- selection test development
- job analysis

=== Centre for Security Science ===
The DRDC Centre for Security Science operates in partnership with Public Safety Canada. It conducts research and development activities in the field of public safety and security science and technology as well as related testing and assessment activities. The Centre identifies trends in security technology and related threats, and maintains a network of national and international science and technology experts and partners involved in public safety and security.

The Centre also leads the Canadian Safety and Security Program and the Emergency Responder Testing and Evaluation Establishment.

=== Defence Research Establishment Pacific (DREP) ===
Defence Research Establishment Pacific (DREP) was closed in 1994. It was located in Naden, Esquimalt, a suburb of Victoria, BC, and was originally called the Pacific Naval Laboratory (PNL). DREP was engaged in a variety of research areas. One group did materials research. Materials subgroups included one for Non Destructive Testing of materials including ultrasound, x-ray, and eddy current methods; a composite mechanics subgroup working on interlaminar fracture (delamination) of composite laminated structural materials and bolted joint mechanics research for composites; and a metals fracture subgroup.

Other groups worked on submarine detection, adhesives chemistry, and engine health monitoring.

== Civilian achievements ==
Over the years, researchers at DRDC, sometimes in partnership with the NRC and others, have been responsible for numerous innovations and inventions of practical application in the civilian world. These include the G-suit, motorized wheelchair, the Alouette 1 satellite, Black Brant rocket, improvements to the carbon dioxide laser, flight data recorder, the Ballard fuel cell membrane, and the Bombsniffer (using gas chromatography and ion mobility spectrometry).

== See also ==
- Canadian government scientific research organizations
- Canadian university scientific research organizations
- Canadian industrial research and development organizations
- Canada and weapons of mass destruction
- Royal Military College of Canada
- Canadian Forces College
- The Technical Cooperation Program (TTCP) – An international defence science and technology collaboration between Australia, Canada, New Zealand, the United Kingdom and the United States.
- Defence Research and Development Canada participates in the WorldWideScience global science gateway.
- Defence Research Agency
- Defence Evaluation and Research Agency
- Defence Science and Technology Laboratory
