= Menzies Bay (British Columbia) =

Bay in British Columbia

Coordinates: 50°07′N 125°23′W

Menzies Bay is a large bay adjoining Seymour Narrows and Quadra Island north of Campbell River on Vancouver Island. It was once considered in 1872 as a crossing point to Vancouver Island for the Canadian Pacific Railway from Sonora Island and Bute Inlet in that project's quest for a transcontinental line. The bay was the site of a Bloedel, Stewart and Welch railroad logging camp in the 1930s, and adjacent to Ripple Rock.

== Background ==
There is a private campsite on the beach. The Akriggs say that this bay was likely named after Archibald Menzies, a botanist and surgeon who served aboard HMS Discovery and HMS Prince of Wales.

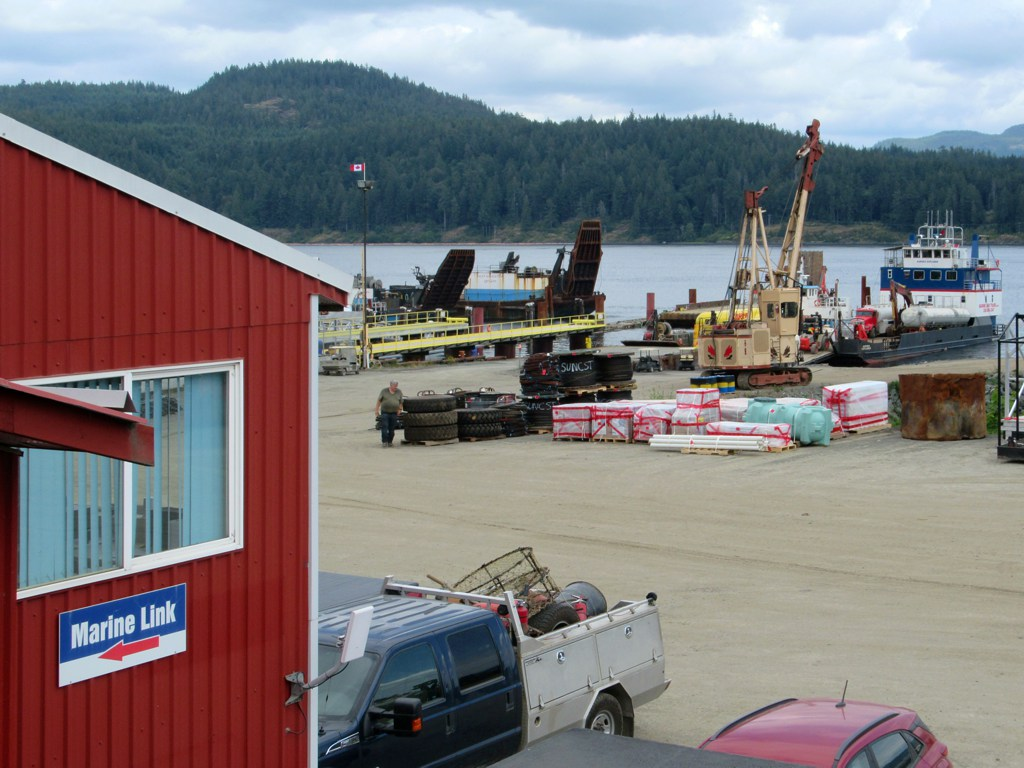
