= Seymour Narrows =

Section of Discovery Passage, British Columbia, Canada

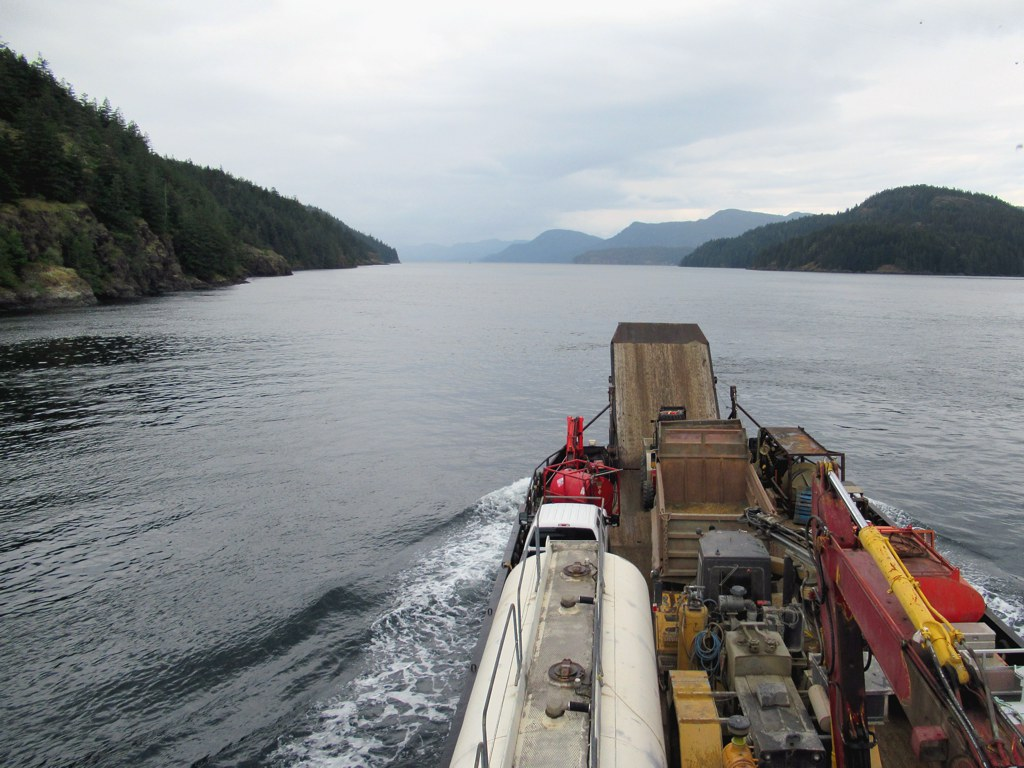
- Approaching Seymour Narrows from the north

- Location within British Columbia

- Location of Seymour Narrows in the Discovery Islands
- Location: British Columbia, Canada
- Coordinates: 50°08.2′N 125°21.2′W
- Type: Strait
- Part of: Discovery Passage
- Max. width: 750 metres (820 yd)
- Average depth: 100 m (330 ft)

Seymour Narrows is a 5-kilometre (3.1 mi) section of the Discovery Passage in British Columbia known for strong tidal currents. Discovery Passage lies between Vancouver Island at Menzies Bay, British Columbia and Quadra Island except at its northern end where the eastern shoreline is Sonora Island. The section known as Seymour Narrows begins about 18 km (11 mi) from the south end of Discovery Passage where it enters the Georgia Strait near Campbell River. For most of the length of the narrows, the channel is about 750 metres (820 yd) wide. Through this narrow channel, currents can reach 15 knots (28 km/h; 17 mph).

== Etymology ==
The narrows were named for Rear Admiral Sir George Francis Seymour who commanded the Pacific Station from 1844 to 1848. Seymour Narrows was described by Captain George Vancouver as "one of the vilest stretches of water in the world." Even after Ripple Rock was removed, it remains a challenging route. In March 1981, the freighter Star Philippine ran aground in the narrows.

== Hydrology ==
Seymour Narrows is notable also because the flowing current can be sufficiently turbulent to realize a Reynolds number of about 10^{8}, i.e. one hundred million, which is possibly the largest Reynolds number regularly attained in natural water channels on Earth (the current speed is about 8 m/s, 26 ft/s, the nominal depth about 100 m, 330 ft). Turbulence develops usually around a Reynolds number of 2000, depending on the geometric structure of the channel.

Seymour Narrows delineates part of the northern extent of the Salish Sea.

== Ripple Rock ==
Ripple Rock was a submerged twin-peak mountain that lay just nine feet beneath the surface of Seymour Narrows. It was a serious hazard to shipping, sinking 119 vessels and taking 114 lives. The gunboat USS Saranac was one of the rock's first recorded victims. On April 5, 1958, after twenty-seven months of tunneling and engineering work, Ripple Rock was blown up with 1,375 tons of Nitramex 2H explosive making it the largest commercial, non-nuclear blast in North America. The Halifax Explosion in 1917 was larger but it was not a deliberate act.

The event was broadcast live on Canadian television. The footage is also regularly screened at the Campbell River Museum.

Vancouver band The Evaporators wrote a song about the event and released it on their 2004 album Ripple Rock.
