= Largest artificial non-nuclear explosions =

List of large explosions

There have been many extremely large explosions, accidental and intentional, caused by modern high explosives, boiling liquid expanding vapour explosions (BLEVEs), older explosives such as gunpowder, volatile petroleum-based fuels such as petrol, and other chemical reactions. This list contains the largest known examples, sorted by date. An unambiguous ranking in order of severity is not possible; a 1994 study by historian Jay White of 130 large explosions suggested that they need to be ranked by an overall effect of power, quantity, radius, loss of life and property destruction, but concluded that such rankings are difficult to assess.

The weight of an explosive does not correlate directly with the energy or destructive effect of an explosion, as these can depend upon many other factors such as containment, proximity, purity, preheating, and external oxygenation (in the case of thermobaric weapons, gas leaks and BLEVEs).

For this article, explosion means "the sudden conversion of potential energy (chemical or mechanical) into kinetic energy", as defined by the US National Fire Protection Association, or the common dictionary meaning, "a violent and destructive shattering or blowing apart of something". No distinction is made as to whether it is a deflagration with subsonic propagation or a detonation with supersonic propagation. The resulting explosions can still be ranked by their effects however, using TNT equivalence.

== Before World War I ==
=== Fall of Antwerp ===
On 4 April 1585, during the Spanish siege of Antwerp, a fortified bridge named "Puente Farnesio" (after the commander of the Spanish forces, Alessandro Farnese) had been built by the Spanish on the River Scheldt. The Dutch launched four large hellburners (explosive fire ships filled with gunpowder and rocks) to destroy the bridge and thereby isolate the city from reinforcement. Three of the hellburners failed to reach the target, but one containing four tons of explosive struck the bridge. It did not explode immediately, which gave time for some Spaniards, believing the ship to be a conventional fire ship, to board it to attempt to extinguish it. There was then a devastating blast that killed 800 Spaniards on the bridge, throwing bodies, rocks and pieces of metal a distance of several kilometres. A small tsunami arose in the river, the ground shook for kilometres around and a large, dark cloud covered the area. The blast was felt as far as 35 kilometres (22 mi) away in Ghent, where windows vibrated.

=== Wanggongchang Explosion ===
About nine o'clock in the morning of 30 May 1626, an explosion of combustibles at the Wanggongchang Armory in Ming-era Beijing, China, destroyed almost everything within an area of two square kilometres (0.77 sq mi) surrounding the site. The estimated death toll was 20,000. About half of Beijing, from Xuanwumen Gate in the South to the modern West Chang'an Boulevard in the North, was affected. Guard units stationed as far away as Tongzhou, nearly 40 kilometres (25 mi) away, reported hearing the blast and feeling the earth tremble.

=== Great Torrington, Devon ===
On 16 February 1646, 80 barrels (5.72 tons) of gunpowder were accidentally ignited by a stray spark during the Battle of Torrington in the English Civil War, destroying the church in which the magazine was located and killing several Royalist guards and a large number of Parliamentarian prisoners who were being kept there. The explosion effectively ended the battle, bringing victory to the Parliamentarians. It almost killed the Parliamentarian commander, Sir Thomas Fairfax. Great damage was caused.

=== Delft Explosion ===
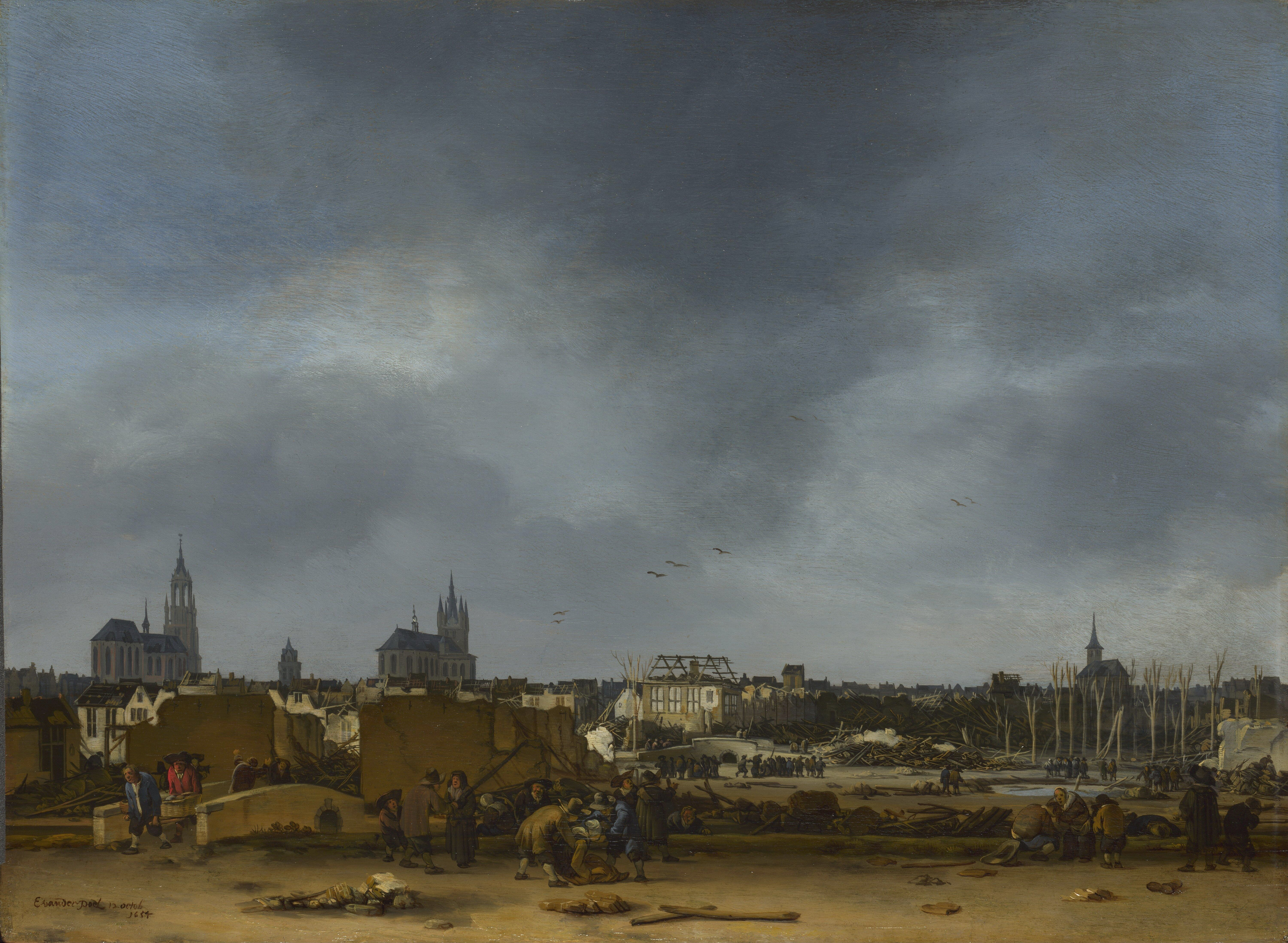
Painting of the aftermath of the Delft explosion by Egbert van der Poel

About 30 tonnes of gunpowder exploded on 12 October 1654, destroying much of the city of Delft in the Netherlands. More than a hundred people were killed and thousands were injured.

=== Siege of Buda ===
On 22 July 1686, 80 tons of gunpowder exploded in the castle of Buda, killing 1,500 Ottoman defenders and destroying a large portion of the defences. According to contemporary accounts, the blast wave also pushed the Danube out of its riverbed, destroying boats and causing flooding on the left (Pest) bank. The cause of the explosion was most likely a shot fired by a famed Italian artillery officer and Franciscan friar, "Fiery" Gabriel, which penetrated into the underground ammunition dump.

=== Destruction of the Parthenon ===
On 26 September 1687, the Parthenon, up until then intact, was ruined partially when an Ottoman ammunition bunker inside was struck by a Venetian mortar. 300 Turkish soldiers were killed in the explosion.

=== Brescia Explosion ===
On 18 August 1769, the Bastion of San Nazaro in Brescia, Italy was struck by lightning. The resulting fire ignited 90 tonnes of gunpowder being stored, and the subsequent explosion destroyed one-sixth of the city and killed 3,000 people.

=== Leiden gunpowder disaster ===
On 12 January 1807, a ship carrying hundreds of barrels of black powder exploded in the city of Leiden in the Kingdom of Holland. The disaster killed 151 people and destroyed more than 200 buildings in the city.

=== Siege of Almeida ===
On 26 August 1810, in Almeida, Portugal, during the Peninsular War phase of the Napoleonic Wars, French Grande Armée forces commanded by Marshal André Masséna besieged the garrison; the garrison was commanded by British Brigadier General William Cox. A shell made a chance hit on the medieval castle, within the star fortress, which was being used as the powder magazine. It ignited 4,000 prepared charges, which in turn ignited 68 tonnes of black powder and 1,000,000 musket cartridges. The ensuing explosions killed 600 defenders and wounded 300. The medieval castle was destroyed and sections of the defences were damaged. Unable to reply to the French cannonade without gunpowder, Cox was forced to capitulate the next day with the survivors of the blast and 100 cannons. The French losses during the operation were 58 killed and 320 wounded.

=== Fort York magazine explosion ===
On 27 April 1813, the magazine of Fort York in York, Ontario (now Toronto) was fired by retreating British troops during an American invasion. 13.6 tonnes of gunpowder and thirty thousand cartridges exploded sending debris, cannonballs and musketballs over the American troops. Thirty-eight soldiers, including General Zebulon Pike, the American commander, were killed and 222 were wounded.

=== Battle of Negro Fort ===
On 27 July 1816, a fort built in the War of 1812 by the British Army at Prospect Bluff in Spanish West Florida, and occupied by about 330 Maroons, Seminole, and Choctaw, was attacked by Andrew Jackson's navy as part of the First Seminole War. There was an exchange of cannon fire; the first red-hot cannonball fired by the navy entered the fort's powder magazine, which exploded. The explosion, heard more than 100 miles (160 km) away, destroyed the entire post which was supplied initially with "three thousand stand of arms, from five to six hundred barrels of powders and a great quantity of fixed ammunition, shot, shells". About 270 men, women and children lay dead. General Edmund P. Gaines later said that the "explosion was awful and the scene horrible beyond description". Reports mention no American military casualties.

=== Siege of Multan ===
On 30 December 1848, in Multan during the Second Anglo-Sikh War, a mortar shell hit 180 tonnes of gunpowder stored in a mosque, causing an explosion and many casualties.

=== Great fire of Newcastle and Gateshead ===
The 6 October 1854 great fire of Newcastle and Gateshead, UK, caused the explosion of combustibles in a bond warehouse on the quayside, which rained masonry and flaming timbers across wide areas of both cities, and left a crater with a depth of 40 feet (12 m) and 50 feet (15 m) in diameter. The explosion was heard at locations as far as 40 miles (64 km) away. 53 people died, and 400 to 500 were injured.

=== Church of St John of the Collachium Explosion ===
On 6 November 1856 lightning struck 3,000 to 6,000 hundredweight (about 150–300 tonnes) of gunpowder stored by the Ottoman Empire in the bell tower of the Church of St John of the Collachium near the Palace of the Grand Master of the Knights of Rhodes in Rhodes, causing a blast that destroyed large parts of the city and killed 4,000 people.

=== The Battle of the Crater during the siege of Petersburg, Virginia ===
During the US Civil War at 4:44 a.m. on 30 July 1864, the Union Army of the Potomac besieging the Confederate Army of Northern Virginia at Petersburg, Virginia detonated a mine containing 320 kegs of gunpowder, totalling 8,000 pounds (3,600 kg) under the Confederate entrenchments. The explosion killed 278 Confederate soldiers of the 18th and 22nd South Carolina regiments and created a crater 170 feet (52 m) long, 100 to 120 feet (30 to 37 m) wide, and at least 30 feet (9 m) deep. After the explosion, attacking Union forces charged into the crater instead of around its rim. Trapped in the crater of their own making, the Union forces were easy targets for the Confederate soldiers once they recovered from the shock of the explosion. Union forces suffered 3798 casualties (killed, wounded, or captured) vs 1491 total losses for the Confederates. The Union forces failed to break through the Confederate defences despite the success of the mine. The Battle of the Crater (as it was later named) was thus a victory for the Confederacy. However, the siege continued.

=== Fort Fisher Magazine explosion ===
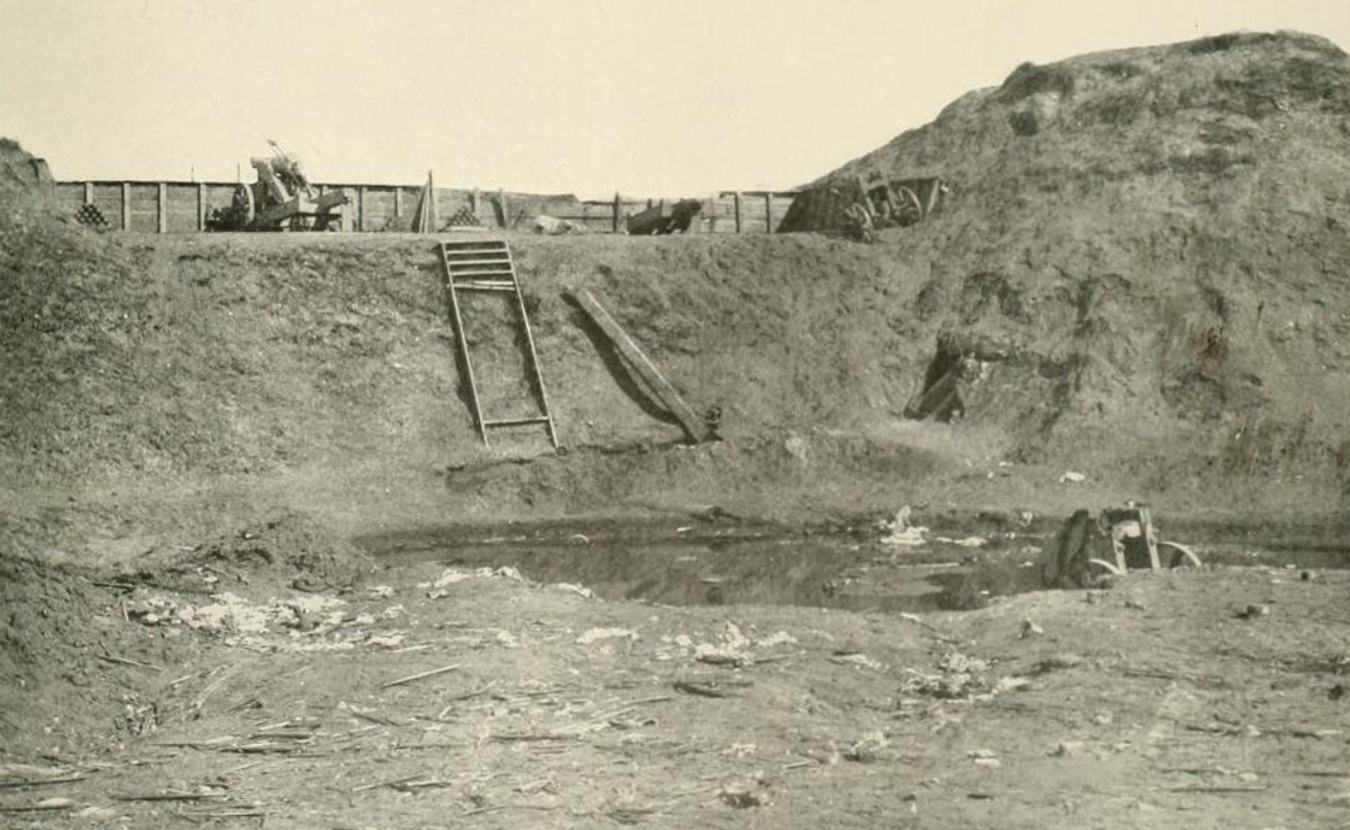
A cropped interior view of Fort Fisher from the northeast angle showing the site of the reserve powder magazine that exploded.

In 1865 during the US Civil War, after the Union Army captured Fort Fisher, North Carolina, the accidental explosion of the fort magazine resulted in an estimated 200 deaths.

=== Mobile magazine explosion ===
On 25 May 1865, in Mobile, Alabama, in the United States, an ordnance depot (magazine) exploded, killing 300 people. This event occurred six weeks after the end of the American Civil War, during the occupation of the city by victorious Federal troops.

=== Flood Rock explosion ===
On 10 October 1885 in New York City, the U.S. Army Corps of Engineers detonated 300,000 pounds (150 t) of explosives on Flood Rock, annihilating the island, in order to clear the Hell Gate tidal strait for the benefit of East River shipping traffic. The explosion sent a geyser of water 250 ft (76 m) in the air; the blast was felt as far away as Princeton, New Jersey. The explosion has been described as "the largest planned explosion before testing began for the atomic bomb". Rubble from the detonation was used in 1890 to fill the gap between Great Mill Rock and Little Mill Rock, merging the two into a single island, Mill Rock.

=== Explosion of steamship Cabo Machichaco ===
On 3 November 1893, in Santander, Spain, the steamship Cabo Machichaco caught fire when it was docked. The ship was laden with 51 tons of dynamite and 12 tons of sulphuric acid from Galdácano, Basque Country, but authorities were unaware of this. Municipal firefighters and crew from other vessels boarded Cabo Machichaco to help fight the fire, while local dignitaries and a large crowd of people watched from the shore. At 4:45 pm an enormous explosion destroyed the ship and nearby buildings and generated a huge wave that washed over the seafront. Pieces of iron and débris were thrown as far as Peñacastillo, 8 km (5 mi) away, where a person was killed by the falling débris. 590 people were killed, and between 500 and 2,000 were injured.

=== Braamfontein explosion ===
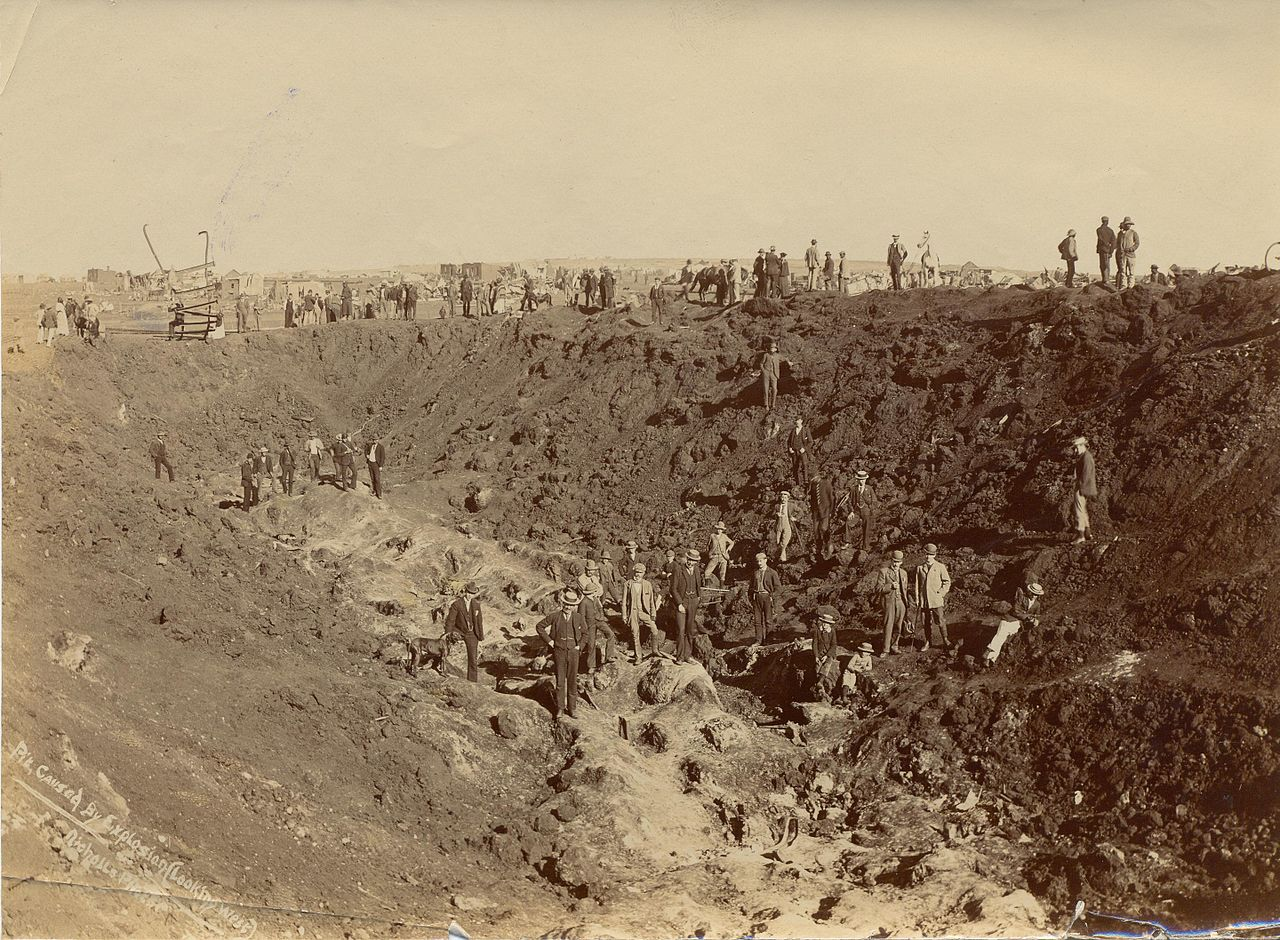
The hole created by the Braamfontein dynamite explosion (looking west) at Maraisburg on 19 February 1896

On 19 February 1896, an explosives train at Braamfontein station in Johannesburg, loaded with between 56 and 60 tons of blasting gelatine for the gold mines of the Witwatersrand and having been standing for three and a half days in searing heat, was struck by a shunting train. The load exploded, leaving a crater in the Braamfontein rail yard 60 metres (200 ft) long, 50 metres (160 ft) wide and 8 metres (26 ft) deep. The explosion was heard up to 200 kilometres (120 mi) away. 75 people were killed, and more than 200 injured. Surrounding suburbs were destroyed, and roughly 3,000 people lost their homes. Almost every window in Johannesburg was broken.

=== USS Maine ===
On 15 February 1898, more than 5 tons of gunpowder exploded in USS Maine in the Havana Harbour, Cuba, killing 266 on board. Spanish investigations found that it was likely started by spontaneous combustion of the adjacent coal bunker or accidental ignition of volatile gases. The 1898 US Navy investigation blamed an assumed mine, which caused public outrage in the United States and sympathy for the Spanish–American War.

=== Fontanet, Indiana ===
On 15 October 1907, approximately 40,000 kegs of combustible powder exploded in Fontanet, Indiana, killing between 50 and 80 people, and destroying the town. The sound of the explosion was heard over 200 miles (320 km) away, with damage occurring to buildings 25 miles (40 km) away.

=== DuPont Powder Mill Explosion, Pleasant Prairie, Wisconsin ===
On 9 March 1911, the village of Pleasant Prairie and neighbouring town of Bristol, 4 miles (6.4 km) away, were levelled by the explosion of five magazines holding 300 tons of dynamite, 105,000 kegs of black blasting powder, and five rail wagons filled with dynamite housed at a 190-acre (77-hectare) DuPont blasting powder plant. A crater 100 ft (30 m) deep was left where the plant was. Several hundred people were injured. The plant was closed at the time, so deaths were few, with only three plant employees being killed, E. S. "Old Man" Thompson, Clarence Brady and Joseph Flynt, and Alice Finch, who died of a heart attack after the blast rattled her home in Elgin, Illinois, forty miles (64 km) away. Most buildings in a 5-mile (8.0 km) radius were rendered flat or uninhabitable. The explosion was felt within a radius of 130 miles (210 km), and widely thought to be an earthquake. Residents in nearby Lake County, Illinois saw the fireball and remembering the Peshtigo fire, fled their houses and jumped into Lake Michigan. Police in Chicago scoured the streets, looking for the site of a bombing. Windows were shattered in Madison, Wisconsin, 85 miles (137 km) away, and the explosion was heard as far as 500 miles (800 km) away. A DuPont spokesman was reported as being perplexed by the coverage of the blast, quoted as saying "explosions occur every day in steel mills, flouring mills and grain elevators with hardly a line in the paper".

=== Alum Chine explosion ===
Alum Chine was a Welsh freighter (out of Cardiff) carrying 343 tons of dynamite for use during construction of the Panama Canal. It was anchored off Hawkins Point, near the entrance to Baltimore Harbor in Baltimore, Maryland. The ship exploded on 7 March 1913, killing more than 30 people, injuring about 60, and destroying a tug and two barges. Most accounts describe two distinct explosions.

== World War I ==
=== HMS Princess Irene at Sheerness ===
On 27 May 1915, the minelayer HMS Princess Irene suffered a blast. Wreckage was thrown up to 20 miles (30 km), a collier boat one-half mile (800 m) away had its crane blown off and a crew member killed by a fragment weighing 70 pounds (30 kg). A child ashore was killed by another fragment. A case of butter was found six miles (10 km) away. A total of 352 people were killed but one crew member survived, with severe burns. The ship had been loaded with 300 naval mines containing more than 150 tons of high explosive. An inquiry blamed faulty priming, possibly by untrained personnel.

=== Faversham explosion ===
On 2 April 1916, an explosion blew through the gunpowder mill at Uplees, near Faversham, Kent, when 200 tons of TNT ignited. 105 people died in the explosion. The munitions factory was next to the Thames estuary, and the explosion was heard across the estuary as far away as Norwich, Great Yarmouth, and Southend-on-Sea, where domestic windows were blown out and two large plate-glass shop windows shattered.

=== Battle of Jutland ===
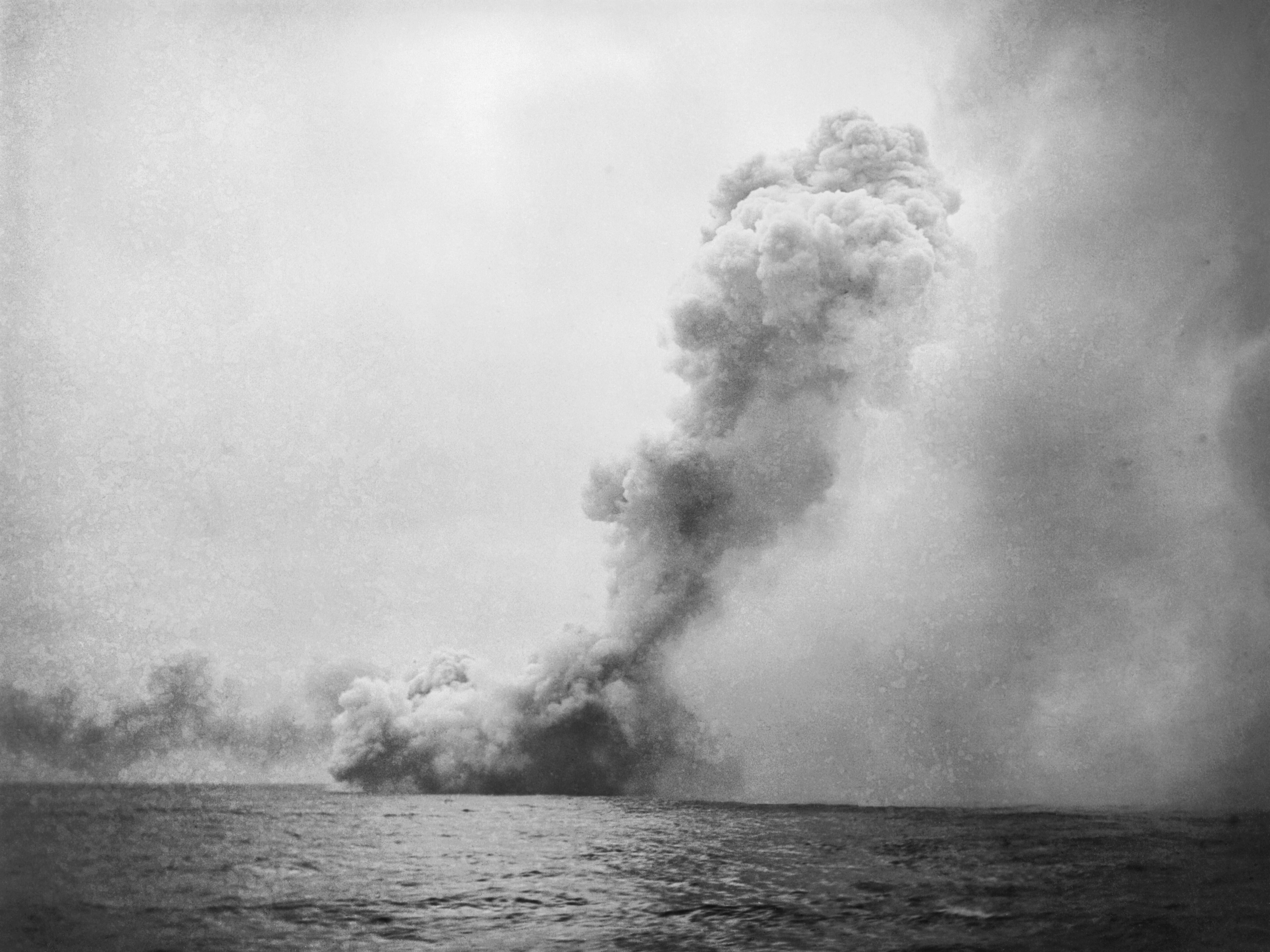
HMS Queen Mary explodes during the Battle of Jutland

On 31 May 1916, three British Grand Fleet battlecruisers were destroyed by cordite deflagrations initiated by armour-piercing shells fired by the Imperial German Navy's High Seas Fleet. At 16:02 HMS Indefatigable was cut in two by deflagration of the forward magazine and sank immediately with all but two of its crew of 1,019. German eyewitness reports and the testimony of modern divers suggest all its magazines exploded. The wreck is now a debris field. At 16:25 HMS Queen Mary was cut in two by detonation of the forward magazine and sank with all but 21 of its crew of 1,283. As the rear section capsized it also exploded. At 18:30 HMS Invincible was cut in two by detonation of the midships magazine and sank in 90 seconds. Six of its crew survived; 1,026 men died, including Rear Admiral Hood. An armoured cruiser, HMS Defence, was a fourth ship to suffer an explosive deflagration at Jutland with at least 893 men killed. The rear magazine was seen to detonate followed by more explosions as the cordite flash travelled along an ammunition passage beneath its broadside guns. Eyewitness reports suggest that HMS Black Prince may also have suffered an explosion as it was lost during the night action with 857 dead, all hands. British reports say it was seen to explode. German reports speak of the ship being overwhelmed at close range and sinking. Finally, during the confused night actions in the early hours of 1 June, the German pre-dreadnought SMS Pommern was hit by one, or possibly two, torpedoes from the British destroyer HMS Onslaught, which detonated one of Pommern's 17-centimetre (6.7 in) gun magazines. The resulting explosion broke the ship in half and killed the entire crew of 839.

=== Mines on the first day of the Somme ===
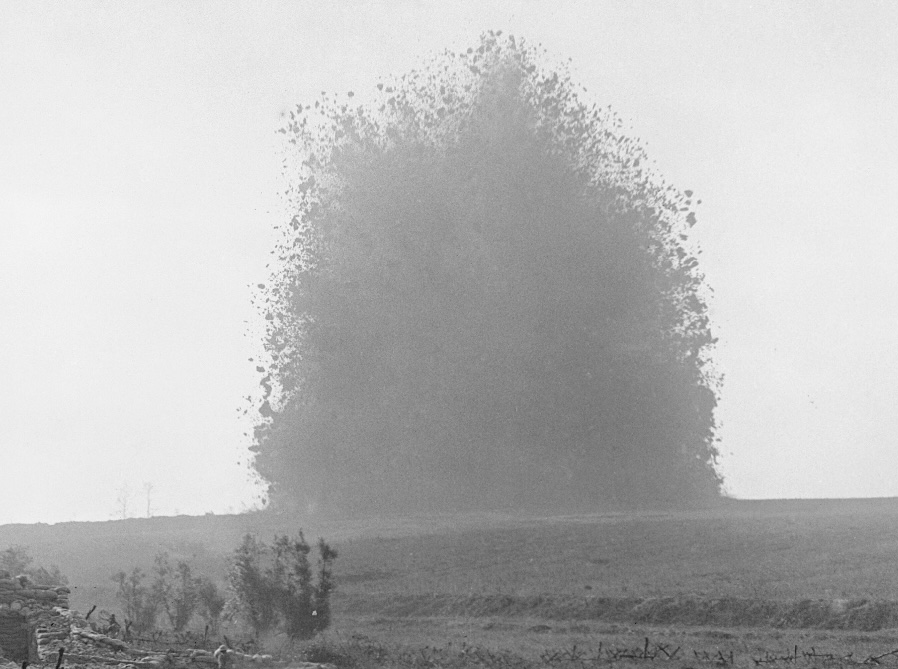
Explosion of the mine under Hawthorn Ridge Redoubt, 1 July 1916

On the morning of 1 July 1916, a series of 19 mines of varying sizes was blown to start the Battle of the Somme. The explosions constituted what was then the loudest human-made sound in history, and could be heard in London. The largest single charge was the Lochnagar mine south of La Boisselle with 60,000 lb (27 t) of ammonal explosive. The mine created a crater 300 ft (90 m) across and 90 ft (30 m) deep, with a rim 15 ft (5 m) high. The crater is known as Lochnagar Crater after the trench from where the main tunnel was started.

=== Black Tom explosion ===
On 30 July 1916, sabotage by German agents caused 1,000 short tons (910 t) of explosives bound for Europe, along with another 50 short tons (45 t) on Johnson Barge No. 17, to explode in Jersey City, New Jersey, a major dock in New York Harbor. There were few deaths, but about 100 injuries. Damage included buildings on Ellis Island, parts of the Statue of Liberty, and much of Jersey City.

=== Silvertown explosion ===
On 19 January 1917, parts of Silvertown in East London were devastated by a TNT explosion at the Brunner-Mond munitions factory. The explosion killed 73 people and injured hundreds. The blast was felt across London and Essex and was heard more than 100 mi (160 km) away, with the resulting fires visible for 30 mi (50 km).

=== Quickborn explosion ===
On 10 February 1917, a chain reaction in an ammunition plant Explosivstoffwerk Thorn in Quickborn-Heide (northern Germany) killed at least 115 people (some sources say more than 200 people), mostly young female workers.

=== Bolevec explosion ===
Škoda Works in Bolevec, Pilsen (modern Plzeň) was the biggest ammunition plant in Austria-Hungary. A series of explosions on 25 May 1917 killed 300 workers. This event inspired Karel Čapek to write the novel Krakatit (1922).

=== Mines in the Battle of Messines ===
On 7 June 1917, a series of large British mines, containing a total of more than 455 tons of ammonal explosive, was detonated beneath German lines on the Messines-Wytschaete ridge. The explosions created 19 large craters, killed about 10,000 German soldiers, and were heard as far away as London and Dublin. Determining the power of explosions is difficult, but this was probably the largest planned explosion in history until the 1945 Trinity atomic weapon test, and the largest non-nuclear planned explosion until the 1947 British Heligoland detonation (below). The Messines mines detonation killed more people than any other non-nuclear deliberate explosion in history.

=== Halifax explosion ===
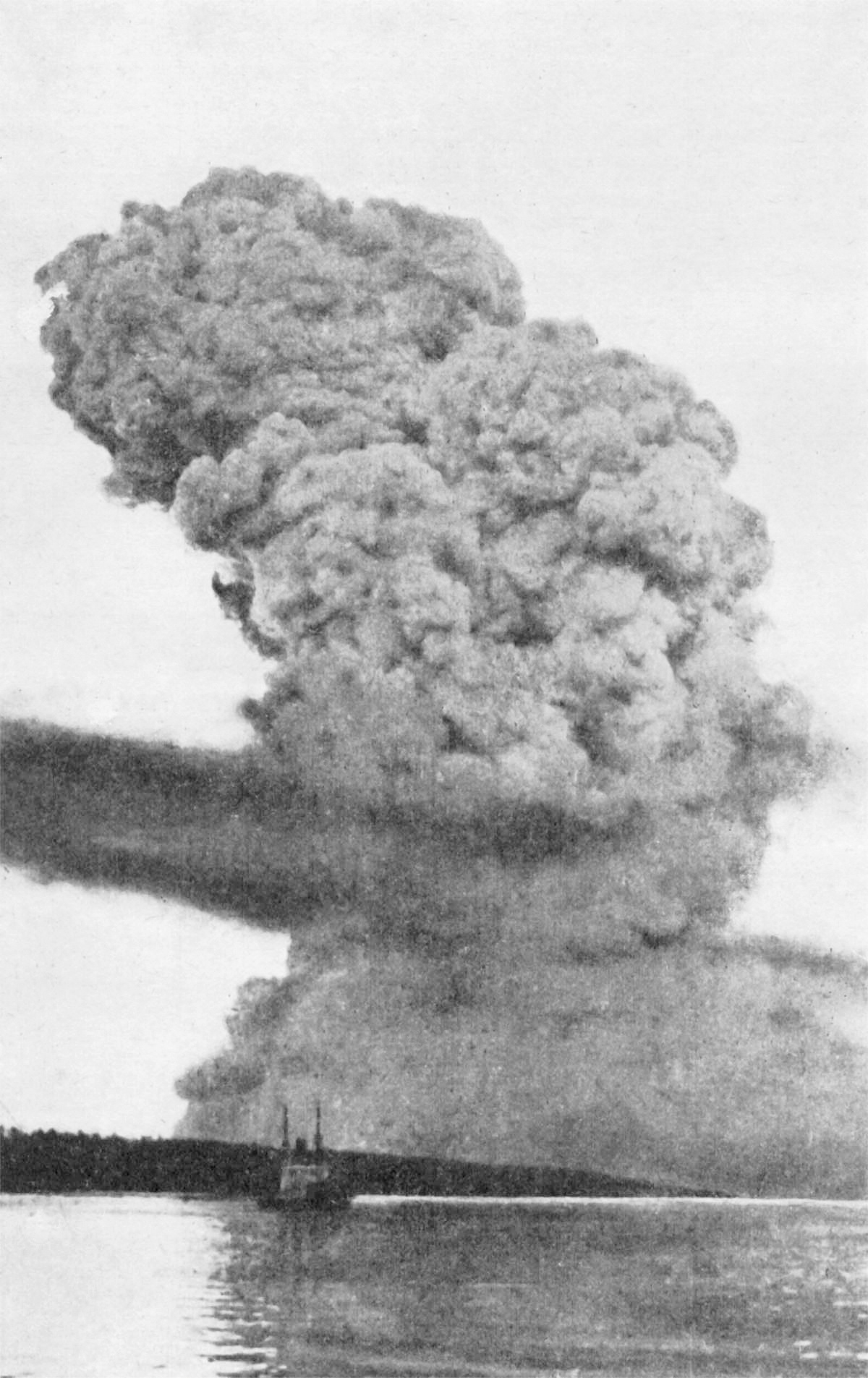
A view of the Halifax Explosion pyrocumulus cloud, most likely from Bedford Basin looking toward the Narrows 15–20 seconds after the explosion.

On 6 December 1917, SS Imo collided with the SS Mont-Blanc in the harbour of Halifax, Nova Scotia. Mont-Blanc carried 2,653 tonnes of various explosives, mostly picric acid. After the collision the ship caught fire, drifted into town, and exploded. The explosion killed 1,950 people and destroyed much of Halifax. An evaluation of the explosion's force puts it at 2.9 kilotons of TNT (12 TJ), making it the second most powerful accidental explosion in terms of explosive force after the 1944 RAF Fauld explosion. Halifax historian Jay White in 1994 concluded: "Halifax Harbour remains unchallenged in overall magnitude as long as five criteria are considered together: number of casualties, force of blast, radius of devastation, quantity of explosive material, and total value of property destroyed."

=== Chilwell Munitions Factory Explosion ===
On 1 July 1918, the National Shell Filling Factory No 6 (Chilwell, near Nottingham, England) was partly destroyed when 8 tons of TNT exploded in the dry mix part of the factory. Approximately 140 workers – mainly young women, known as the 'Chilwell Canaries' because contact with picric acid turned their skin yellow – were killed, though the exact number has never been established. An unknown number of people were injured, though estimates are about 250. Because of the sensitivity of the subject, reports of the explosion were censored until after the Armistice. The cause of the explosion was never officially established, though present-day authorities on explosives consider it was due to a combination of factors: an exceptionally hot day, high production demands and lax safety precautions.

=== Split Rock explosion ===
On 2 July 1918, a munitions factory near Syracuse, New York, exploded after a mixing motor in the main TNT building overheated. The fire rapidly spread through the wooden structure of the main factory. Approximately 1–3 tons of TNT were involved in the blast, which levelled the structure and killed 50 workers (conflicting reports mention 52 deaths).

=== T. A. Gillespie Company Shell Loading Plant explosion ===
On 4 October 1918, an ammunition plant – operated by the T. A. Gillespie Company and located in New Jersey in the Morgan area of Sayreville in Middlesex County – exploded and caused a fire. The subsequent series of explosions continued for three days. The facility, said to be one of the largest in the world at the time, was destroyed, along with more than 300 buildings, forcing the reconstruction of South Amboy and Sayreville. More than 100 people died due to this accident. During a three-day period, a total of 12,000,000 pounds (5,400 t) of explosives was destroyed.

== Interwar period ==
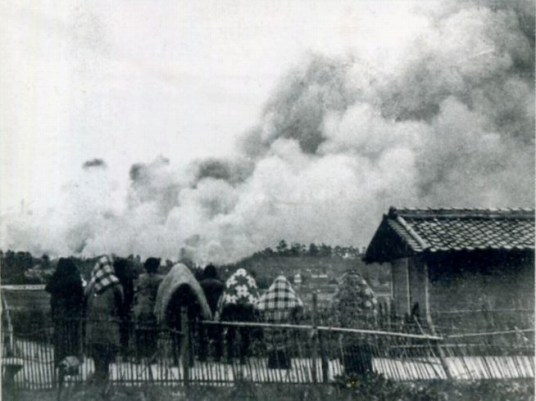
1939 Japanese Imperial Army ammunition dump exploded in Hirakata, Osaka, Japan.

=== Oppau explosion ===
On 21 September 1921, a BASF silo filled with 4,500 tonnes of fertilizer exploded, killing about 560, largely destroying Oppau, Germany, and causing damage more than 30 km (19 mi) away.

=== Nixon Nitration Works disaster ===
On 1 March 1924, an explosion destroyed a building in Nixon, New Jersey, used for processing ammonium nitrate. The explosion caused fires in surrounding buildings in the Nixon Nitration Works that contained other highly flammable materials. The disaster killed 20 people and destroyed 40 buildings.

=== Leeudoringstad explosion ===
On 17 July 1932, a train carrying 320 to 330 tons of dynamite from the De Beers factory at Somerset West to the Witwatersrand exploded and flattened the small town of Leeudoringstad in South Africa. Five people were killed and 11 injured in the sparsely populated area.

=== Neunkirchen gas detonation ===
On 10 February 1933, a gas storage in Neunkirchen, Territory of the Saar Basin, detonated during maintenance work. The detonation could be heard at a distance of 124 miles (200 km). The death toll was 68, and 160 were injured.

=== New London School explosion ===
On 18 March 1937, a natural gas leak caused an explosion, destroying the London School of New London, Texas. The disaster killed more than 295 students and teachers, making it the deadliest school disaster in American history. Letters of sympathy were sent from around the world, including a telegram from Adolf Hitler.

=== Hirakata ammunition dump explosion ===
On 1 March 1939, Warehouse No. 15 of the Imperial Japanese Army's Kinya ammunition dump in Hirakata, Osaka Prefecture, Japan, suffered a catastrophic explosion, the sound of which could be heard throughout the Keihan area. Additional explosions followed during the next few days as the depot burned, for a total of 29 explosions by 3 March. Japanese officials reported that 94 people died, 604 were injured, and 821 houses were damaged, with 4,425 households in all suffering the effects of the explosions.

== World War II ==
=== Pluton ===
On 13 September 1939, the French cruiser Pluton exploded and sank while offloading naval mines in Casablanca, in French Morocco. The explosion killed 186 men, destroyed three nearby armed trawlers, and damaged nine more.

=== Hercules Powder Plant ===
On 12 September 1940, nearly 300,000 pounds (140 t) of gunpowder exploded at the Hercules Company in the Kenvil area of Roxbury, New Jersey. At least 51 people were killed, more than 100 injured, and twenty buildings flattened. It remains unknown if this was an industrial accident, or sabotage by pro-IRA or pro-Nazi factions.

=== SS Clan Fraser ===
On 6 April 1941, SS Clan Fraser was moored in Piraeus Harbour, Greece. Three German Luftwaffe bombs struck the ship, igniting 350 tonnes of TNT; a barge nearby carried an additional 100 tonnes which also detonated. Royal Navy warships HMS Ajax and HMS Calcutta attempted to tow the stricken vessel out of harbour and succeeded in getting beyond the breakwater, after the tow line had broken three times. It then exploded, levelling large areas of the port. This was witnessed by post-war author Roald Dahl, who was piloting a Hawker Hurricane fighter plane for the Royal Air Force.

=== SS Malakand explosion ===
During World War II, SS Malakand was loaded with munitions at the Huskisson Dock in Liverpool, England, on the evening of 3 May 1941 during a heavy German air raid – a part of the city's "May Blitz" – when flames from dock sheds that had been bombed spread to her. The fire services could not contain the fire and on 4 May 1941, a few hours after the raid had ended, the 1000 tons of high explosive on board the Malakand exploded, destroying the entire Huskisson No. 2 dock and killing four people. Debris from the ship was strewn up to 2.5 miles away. The two ton anchor stock from the ship landed outside Bootle General Hospital, Derby Road, 1.5 miles from the scene. It took seventy-four hours for the fire to burn out.

=== HMS Hood ===
On 24 May 1941, HMS Hood sank in three minutes after the stern magazine detonated during the Battle of the Denmark Strait. The wreck has been located in three pieces, suggesting additional detonation of a forward magazine. There were only three survivors from the crew of 1,418.

=== HMS Barham ===
On 25 November 1941, HMS Barham was sunk by the German submarine U-331; 862 crew were lost. The main magazine's explosion was filmed by a Pathé News cameraman aboard nearby HMS Valiant.

=== Smederevo Fortress explosion ===
During World War II, German invading forces in Serbia used Smederevo Fortress for ammunition storage. On 5 June 1941 it exploded, blasting through the entirety of Smederevo and reaching settlements as far as 10 km (6.2 mi) away. Much of the southern wall of the fortress was destroyed, the nearby railway station, packed with people, was blown away, and most of the buildings in the city were turned into debris. About 2,500 people died in the explosion, and half of the inhabitants were injured (approximately 5,500).

=== Tessenderlo Disaster ===
On Wednesday, 29 April 1942, an explosion destroyed the entire Produits Chimiques de Tessenderloo factory and much of the surrounding town of Tessenderlo in German-occupied Belgium. A nearby school was largely destroyed, with 60 schoolchildren losing their lives. The blast hurled steel beams as long as 15 metres into fields hundreds of metres away and left a crater 70 metres wide and 23 metres deep. The explosion occurred when factory workers tried to separate big chunks of newly arrived ammonium nitrate (200 t) using dynamite, after failing to do so using regular tools. In total, 189 people died and more than 900 were injured in the incident.

=== SS Surrey ===
On the night of 10 June 1942, the German submarine U-68 torpedoed the 8,600-ton British freighter Surrey in the Caribbean Sea. Five thousand tons of dynamite in the cargo detonated after the ship sank. The shock wave lifted U-68 out of the water as if it had suffered a torpedo hit, and both diesel engines and the gyrocompass were disabled.

=== SS Hatimura ===
On the night of 17 November 1942, torpedoes detonated the ammunition cargo of the 6,690-ton British freighter Hatimura. Both the freighter and attacking submarine U-132 were destroyed by the explosion.

=== Naples Caterina Costa explosion ===
On 28 March 1943, in the port of Naples, a fire began on Caterina Costa, an 8,060-ton motor ship carrying arms and supplies (1,000 tons of gas, 900 tons of explosives, tanks and others); the fire became uncontrollable, causing a devastating explosion. A large number of buildings around were destroyed or badly damaged. Some ships nearby caught fire and sank, and hot parts of the ship and tanks were thrown great distances. More than 600 people died and more than 3,000 were wounded.

=== Bombay Docks explosion ===
On 14 April 1944, SS Fort Stikine, carrying about 1,400 long tons (1,400 t) of explosives (among other goods), caught fire and exploded, killing about 800 people. Debris fell across the city landing miles away from the site of the explosion. The bales of cotton aboard the boat caught fire and fell from the sky causing fires in other parts of the city. The explosion was strong enough to be detected on seismographs in Simla, a city more than 1700 km from the site of the explosion.

=== Bergen Harbour explosion ===
On 20 April 1944, the Dutch steam trawler ST Voorbode, loaded with 124,000 kilograms (124 t) of explosives, caught fire and exploded in Norway at the quay in the centre of Bergen. The air pressure from the explosion and the tsunami that resulted flattened whole neighbourhoods near the harbour. Fires broke out in the aftermath, leaving 5,000 people homeless. 160 people were killed, and 5,000 wounded.

=== SS Paul Hamilton ===
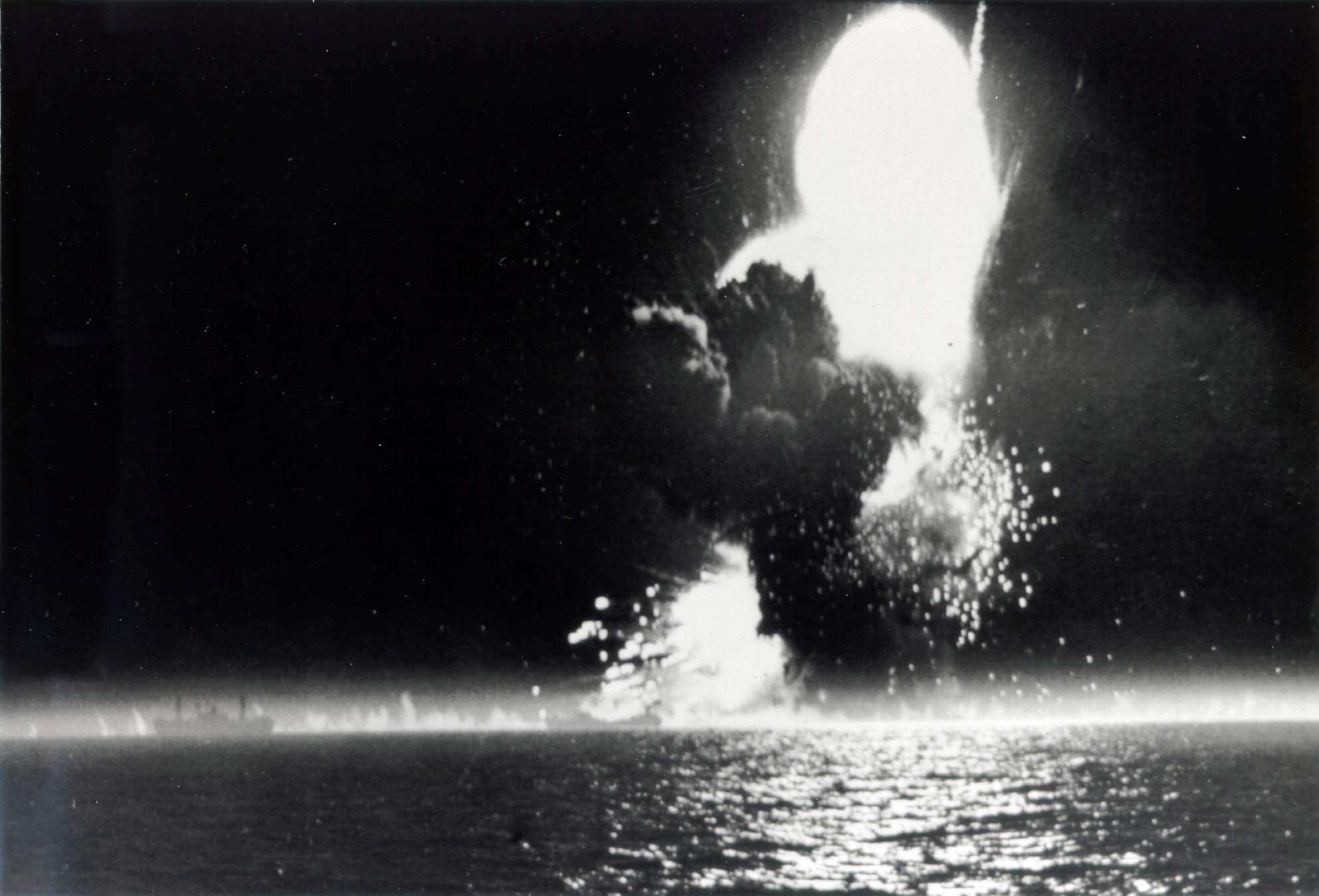
SS Paul Hamilton explodes.

On 20 April 1944, the Liberty ship SS Paul Hamilton was attacked 30 miles (48 km) off Cape Bengut near Algiers by Luftwaffe bombers. The ship was destroyed within 30 seconds killing all 580 personnel aboard when the cargo of bombs and explosives detonated.

=== West Loch disaster ===
On 21 May 1944, an ammunition handling accident in Hawaii's Pearl Harbor destroyed nine amphibious vessels: six LSTs and three LCTs. Four more LSTs, ten tugs, and a net tender were damaged. Eleven buildings were destroyed ashore and nine more damaged. Between 132 and nearly 400 military personnel were killed.

=== 4 July disaster in Aarhus ===
On 4 July 1944, a barge loaded with ammunition exploded in the harbour of Aarhus, Denmark, killing 39 people and injuring another 250.

=== Port Chicago disaster ===
On 17 July 1944, in Port Chicago, California, SS E. A. Bryan exploded while loading ammunition bound for the Pacific region, with an estimated 4,606 short tons (4,178 t) of high explosive (HE), incendiary bombs, depth charges, and other ammunition. Another 429 short tons (389 t) waiting on nearby rail cars also exploded. The total explosive content is described as between 1,600 and 2,136 tons of TNT. 320 were killed instantly, another 390 wounded. Most of the killed and wounded were African American enlisted men. After the explosion, 258 fellow sailors refused to load ordnance; 50 of these, called the "Port Chicago 50", were convicted of mutiny even though they were willing to obey any order that did not involve loading ordnance under unsafe conditions.

=== Cleveland East Ohio Gas explosion ===
On 20 October 1944, a liquefied natural gas storage tank in Cleveland, Ohio, split and leaked its contents, which spread, caught fire, and exploded. A half hour later, another tank exploded as well. The explosions destroyed 1 square mile (2.6 km^{2}), killed 130, and left 600 homeless.

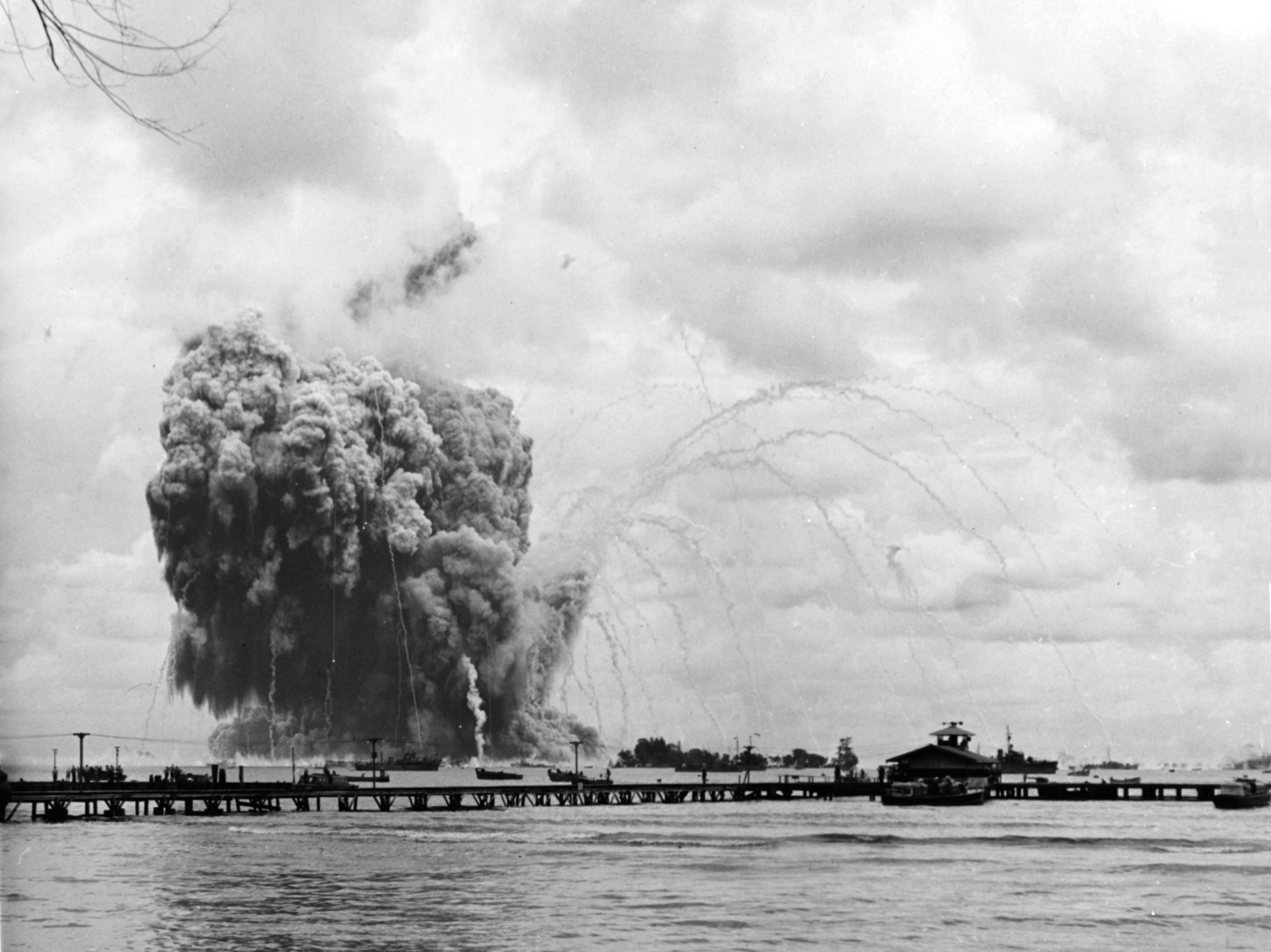
The explosion of USS Mount Hood. The smoke trails are left by fragments ejected by the explosion.

=== USS Mount Hood ===
On 10 November 1944, USS Mount Hood exploded in Seeadler Harbor at Manus Island in Australian New Guinea, with an estimated 3,800 tons of ordnance material on board. Mushrooming smoke rose to 7,000 feet (2,100 m), obscuring the surrounding area for a radius of approximately 500 yards (460 m). Mount Hood's former position was revealed by a trench in the ocean floor 1,000 feet (300 m) long, 200 feet (61 m) wide, and 30 to 40 feet (9.1 to 12.2 m) deep. The largest remaining piece of the hull was found in the trench and measured 16 by 10 feet (4.9 by 3.0 m). All 296 men aboard the ship were killed. USS Mindanao was 350 yards (320 m) away and suffered extensive damage, with 23 crew killed, and 174 injured. Several other nearby ships were also damaged or destroyed. All together 372 were killed and 371 injured in the blast.

=== RAF Fauld explosion ===
On 27 November 1944, the RAF Ammunition Depot at Fauld, Staffordshire, became the site of the largest explosion in the UK, when 3,700 tonnes of bombs stored in underground bunkers covering 17,000 m^{2} (180,000 sq ft) exploded en masse. The explosion was caused by bombs being taken out of store, primed for use, and replaced with the detonators still installed when unused. The crater was 40 metres (130 ft) deep and covered 5 hectares. The death toll was approximately 78, including RAF personnel, six Italian prisoners of war, civilian employees, and local people.

=== Japanese aircraft carrier Unryu ===
On 19 December 1944, the Japanese aircraft carrier Unryu exploded when torpedoes fired by the US submarine USS Redfish detonated the forward magazine. Only 145 men were rescued while 1,238 officers, crewmen and passengers lost their lives.

=== Japanese battleship Yamato ===
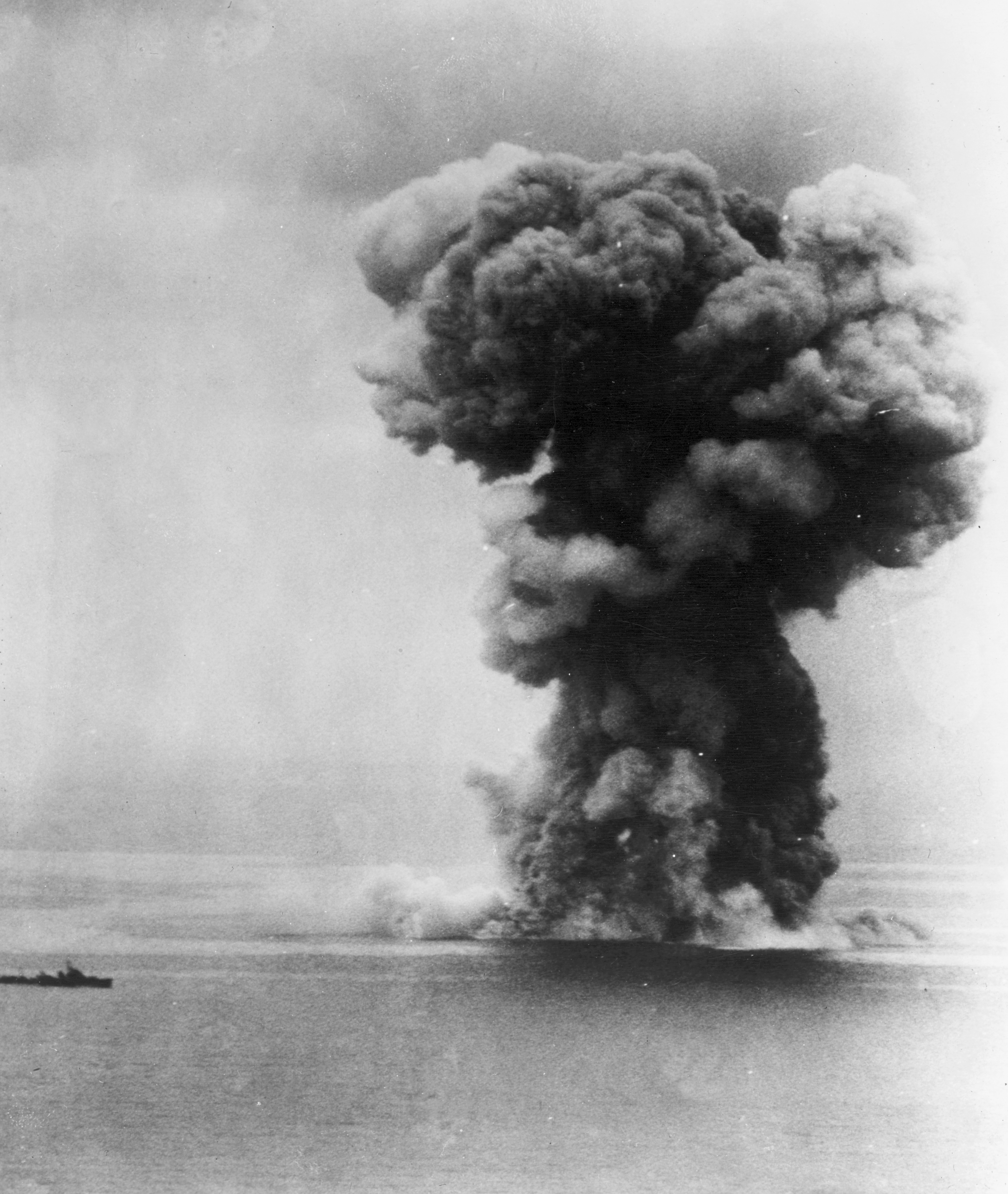
The destruction of Yamato

On 7 April 1945, after six hours of battle, Japanese battleship Yamato's magazine exploded as it sank, resulting in a mushroom cloud rising six kilometres (3.7 mi) above the wreck, and which could be seen from Kyushu, 160 kilometres (99 mi) away. 3,055 crewmen were killed.

=== Trinity calibration test ===
On 7 May 1945, 100 tons of TNT were stacked on a wooden tower and exploded to test the instrumentation prior to the test of the first atomic bomb.

== 1945–2000 ==
=== Futamata Tunnel explosion ===
On 12 November 1945 in Japan, when Allied occupation troops were trying to dispose of 530 tons of ammunition, there was an explosion in a tunnel in Soeda, Fukuoka Prefecture, Kyushu Island. According to a confirmed official report, 147 local residents were killed and 149 people injured.

=== Texas City Disaster ===
On 16 April 1947, the ship SS Grandcamp, loaded with about 2,300 tons of ammonium nitrate, exploded in port at Texas City, Texas. 581 died and more than 5,000 were injured. This is generally considered the worst industrial accident in United States history.

=== Heligoland "British Bang" ===
On 18 April 1947, British engineers attempted to destroy the abandoned German fortifications on the evacuated island of Heligoland in what became known as the "British Bang". The island had been fortified during the war with a submarine base and airfield. Roughly 4000 tons of surplus World War II ammunition were placed in various locations around the island and set off. A significant portion of the fortifications were destroyed, although some survived. According to Willmore, the energy released was 1.3×10^{13} J, or about 3.2 kilotons of TNT equivalent. The blast is listed in the Guinness Book of World Records under largest single explosive detonation, although Minor Scale in 1985 was larger (see below).

=== Ocean Liberty in Brest, France ===
On 28 July 1947, the Norwegian cargo ship Ocean Liberty exploded in the French port of Brest. The cargo consisted of 3,300 tonnes of ammonium nitrate in addition to paraffin and petrol. The explosion killed 22 people, hundreds were injured, 4,000–5,000 buildings were damaged.

=== Cádiz Explosion ===
On 18 August 1947, a naval ammunition warehouse containing mostly mines and torpedoes exploded in Cádiz, in southern Spain, for unknown reasons. The explosion of 200 tons of TNT destroyed a large portion of the city. Officially, the explosion killed 150 people; the real death toll is suspected to be greater.

=== General Vatutin cargo ship explosion in Magadan, Russia ===
On 19 December 1947, the Liberty class cargo ship General Vatutin exploded in the Soviet port of Magadan at Nagayeva Bay on the Russian Far East. The ship transported 3,313 tonnes of ammonal and TNT for the mining industry. Another cargo ship Vyborg, carrying 193 tonnes of chemical substances including detonators and fuse cords, also detonated from the explosion. More than 90 people were killed, more than 500 were injured. The explosion caused a tsunami with broken ice, damaging and destroying many buildings.

=== Mitholz, Switzerland ===
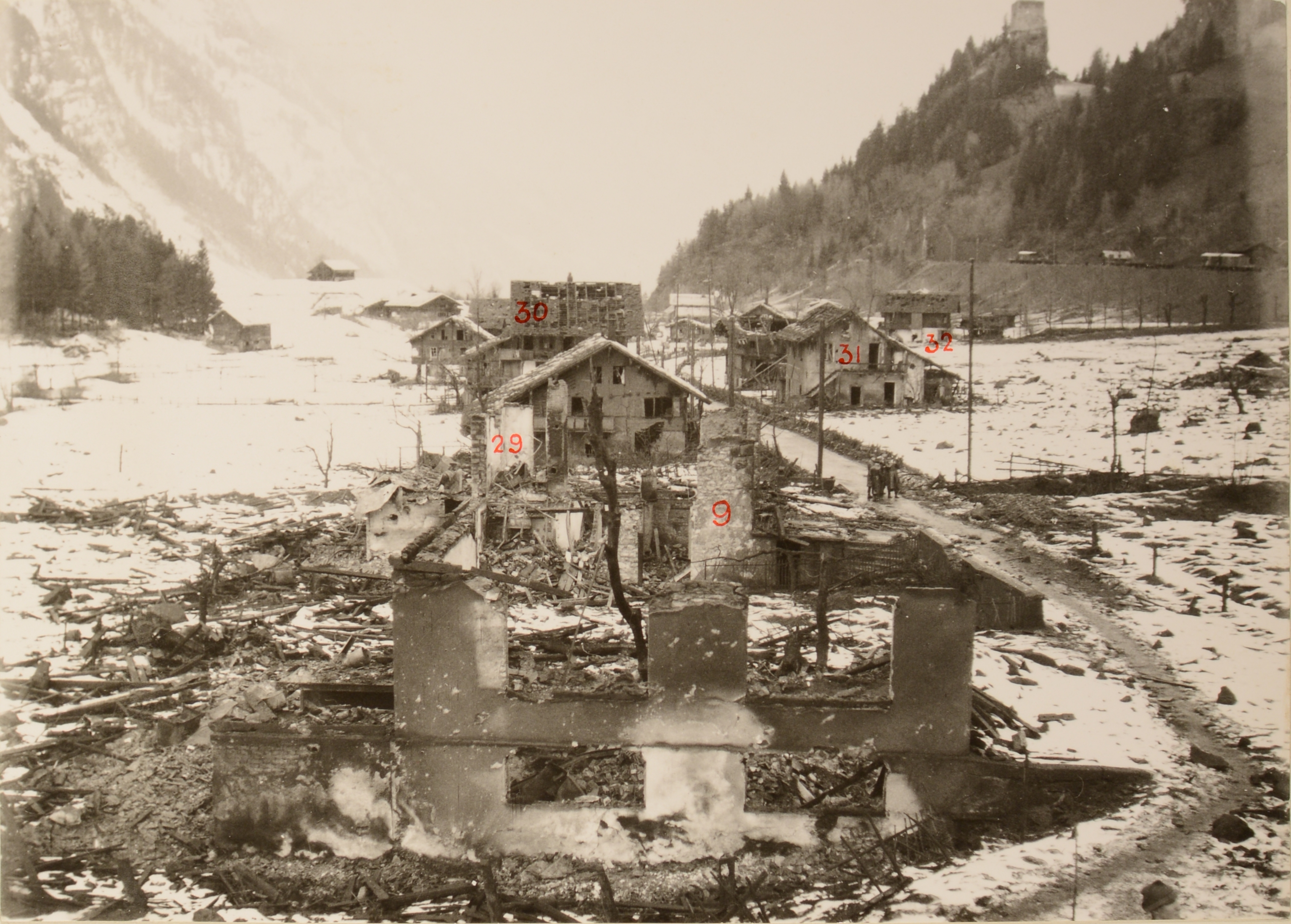
Mitholz.

In December 1947, a Swiss Army ammunition dump exploded at Mitholz, Switzerland. The explosion of 3,000 tonnes of ammunition killed nine people and destroyed every house in the village.

=== Prüm explosion ===
On 15 July 1949 in the German town of Prüm, an underground bunker inside the hill of Kalvarienberg and used previously by the German Army to store ammunition, but now filled with French Army munitions, caught fire. After a mostly successful evacuation, the 500 tonnes of ammunition in the bunker exploded and destroyed large parts of the town. 12 people died and 15 were injured severely.

=== South Amboy powder pier explosion ===
The South Amboy powder pier explosion occurred on 19 May 1950. More than 420 tons of explosives in transit at the Raritan River Port in South Amboy, New Jersey detonated due to unknown causes, killing 31 people and injuring more than 350.

=== Cali explosion, Colombia ===
On 7 August 1956, seven lorries from the Colombian National Army, carrying more than 40 tons of dynamite, exploded. The explosion killed more than 1,000 people, and left a crater 25 metres (82 ft) deep and 60 metres (200 ft) in diameter.

=== Kyshtym disaster, Chelyabinsk Oblast, Soviet Union ===
On 29 September 1957, an explosion occurred within stainless steel containers located in a concrete canyon 8.2 m (27 feet) deep used to store high-level waste. The explosion completely destroyed one of the containers, out of 14 total containers ("cans") in the canyon. The explosion was caused because the cooling system in one of the tanks at Mayak, containing about 70–80 tons of liquid radioactive waste, failed and was not repaired. The temperature in it started to rise, resulting in evaporation and a chemical explosion of the dried waste, consisting mainly of ammonium nitrate and acetates. The explosion was estimated to have had a force of at least 70 tons of TNT.

=== Ripple Rock, British Columbia, Canada ===
On 5 April 1958, an underwater mountain at Ripple Rock, British Columbia, Canada was levelled by the explosion of 1,375 tonnes of Nitramex 2H, an ammonium nitrate-based explosive. This was one of the largest non-nuclear planned explosions on record, and the subject of the first Canadian Broadcasting Corporation live broadcast coast-to-coast.

=== Operation Blowdown ===
On 18 July 1963, a test blast of 50 tons of TNT in the Iron Range area of Queensland, Australia, tested the effects of nuclear weapons on tropical rainforest, military targets and ability of troops to transit through the resulting debris field.

=== CHASE 2, off New Jersey ===
On 17 September 1964, the offshore disposal of the ship Village, containing 7,348 short tons (6,666 t) of obsolete munitions, caused unexpected detonations five minutes after sinking off New Jersey. The detonations were detected on seismic instruments around the world; the incident encouraged intentional detonation of subsequent disposal operations to determine detectability of underwater nuclear testing.

=== Operation Sailor Hat ===
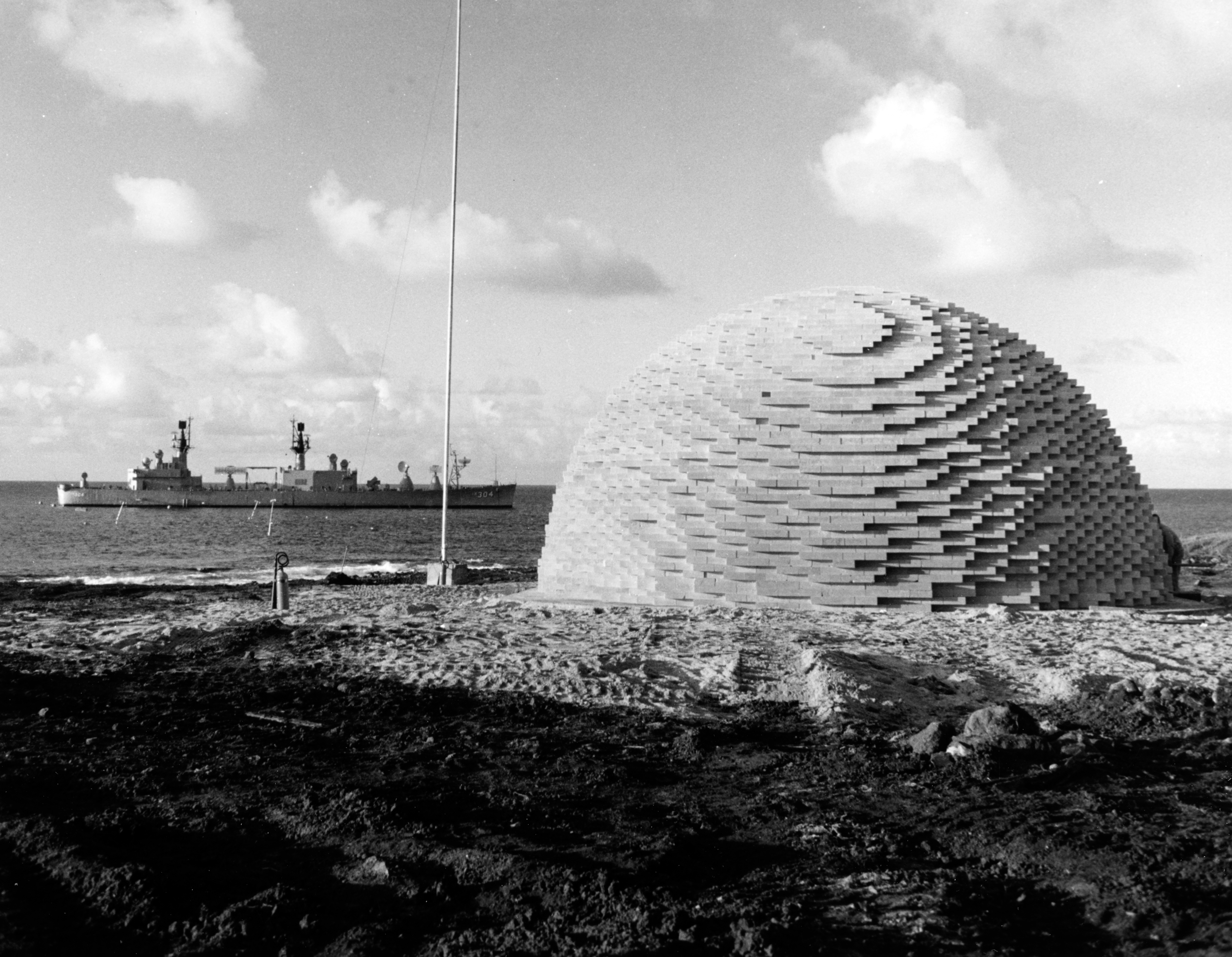
500 short tons (450 t) of high explosives awaiting detonation for Operation Sailor Hat.

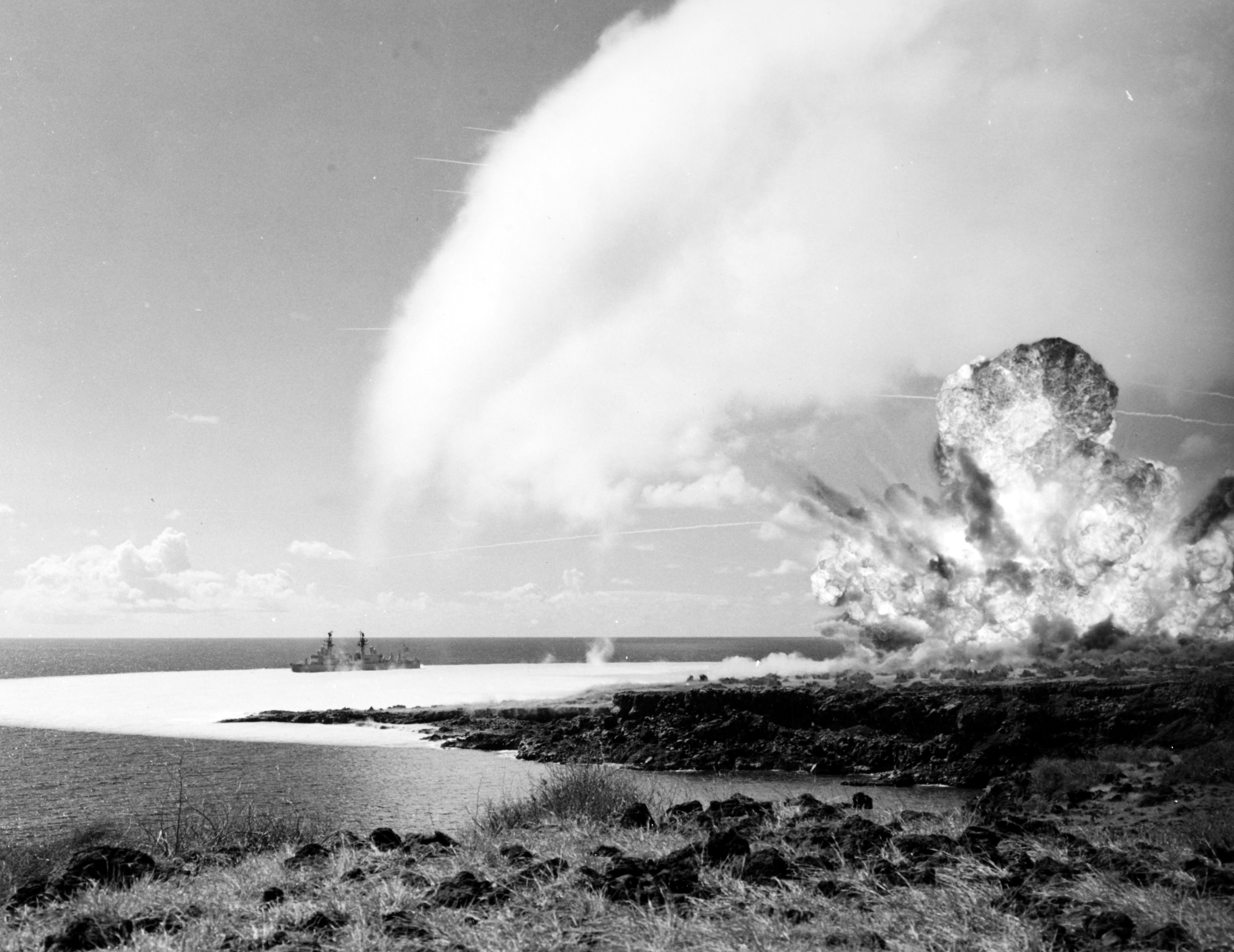
Detonation of explosive during Operation Sailor Hat, with shock front visible moving across the water and shock condensation cloud visible overhead.

A series of tests, Operation Sailor Hat, was performed off Kaho'olawe Island, Hawaii, in 1965, using conventional explosives to simulate the shock effects of nuclear blasts on naval vessels. Each test included the detonation of 500 short tons (450 t) of high explosives.

=== CHASE 3 and 4, off New Jersey ===
On 14 July 1965, Coastal Mariner was loaded with 4,040 short tons (3,670 t) of obsolete munitions containing 512 short tons (464 t) of high explosives. The cargo was detonated at a depth of 1,000 feet (300 m) and created a 600-foot (200 m) water spout, but was not deep enough to be recorded on seismic instruments. On 16 September 1965, Santiago Iglesias was similarly detonated with 8,715 short tons (7,906 t) of obsolete munitions.

=== Feyzin disaster, near Lyon, France ===
On 4 January 1966, an LPG spill occurred near Lyon, France, and resulted in a cloud of propane vapour which persisted until it was ignited by a car passing by. Several tanks erupted in a boiling liquid expanding vapour explosion, causing the deaths of 18 people, the injury of 81 and extensive damage to the site.

=== Medeu Dam ===
On 21 October 1966, a mud flow protection dam near Alma-Ata, Kazakhstan was created by a series of four preliminary explosions of 1,800 tonnes total and a final explosion of 3,600 tonnes of ammonium nitrate-based explosive. On 14 April 1967, the dam was reinforced by an explosion of 3,900 tonnes of ammonium nitrate-based explosive.

=== CHASE 5, off Puget Sound ===
On 23 May 1966, Izaac Van Zandt was loaded with 8,000 short tons (7,300 t) of obsolete munitions containing 400 short tons (360 t) of high explosives. The cargo was detonated off Puget Sound at a depth of 4,000 feet (1,200 m).

=== CHASE 6, off New Jersey ===
On 28 July 1966, Horace Greeley was loaded with obsolete munitions and detonated off New Jersey at a depth of 4,000 feet (1,200 m).

=== SS Kielce salvage ===
In 1967, the salvage company tried to dismantle part of the hull by setting explosive charges. On 22 July 1967, the third of these charges detonated some of her cargo. The explosion was recorded by 25 seismic recording stations, some of them up to 5,000 miles (8,000 km) away. From their recordings, the explosion was estimated to have been about 4.5 on the Richter scale. It left a crater on the seabed 153 feet (47 m) long, 67 feet (20 m) wide, and 20 feet (6 m) deep.

=== N1 launch explosion ===
On 3 July 1969, an N1 rocket in the USSR exploded upon impacting its launch pad at Baikonur Cosmodrome, after a turbopump exploded in one of the engines. The entire rocket contained about 680,000 kg (680 t) of paraffin and 1,780,000 kg (1,780 t) of liquid oxygen. Using a standard energy release of 43 MJ/kg of paraffin gives about 29 TJ for the energy of the explosion (about 6.93 kt TNT equivalent). Investigators later determined that as much as 85% of the fuel in the rocket did not detonate, meaning that the blast yield was likely no more than 1 kt TNT equivalent. Comparing explosions of initially unmixed fuels is difficult (being part detonation and part deflagration).

=== Old Reliable Mine Blast ===
On 9 March 1972, 2,000 tons (4 million pounds) of explosive were detonated inside three levels of tunnels in the Old Reliable Mine near Mammoth, Arizona. The blast was an experimental attempt to break up the ore body so that metals (primarily copper) could be extracted using sulphuric acid in a heap-leach process. The benefits of increased production were short-lived while the costs of managing acid mine drainage due to the sulphide ore body being exposed to oxygen continue to the present.

=== Flixborough disaster ===
On 1 June 1974, a pipe failure at the Nypro chemical plant in Flixborough, England, caused a large release of flammable cyclohexane vapour, which ignited. The resulting fuel-air explosion destroyed the plant, killing 28 people and injuring 36 more. Beyond the plant 1,821 houses and 167 shops and factories had suffered to a greater or lesser degree. Fires burned for 16 days. The explosion occurred during a weekend, otherwise the casualties would have been much greater. This explosion caused a significant strengthening of safety regulations for chemical plants in the United Kingdom.

=== Iri station explosion ===
On 11 November 1977, a freight train carrying 40 tons of dynamite in South Korea from Gwangju suddenly exploded at Iri station (present-day Iksan), Jeollabuk-do province. The cause of the explosion was accidental ignition by a drunk guard. 59 people died, and 185 others seriously wounded; all together, more than 1,300 people were injured or killed.

=== Los Alfaques disaster ===
On 11 July 1978, an overloaded tanker lorry carrying 23 tons of liquefied propylene crashed and ruptured in Spain, emitting a white cloud of ground-hugging fumes which spread into a nearby campground and discothèque before reaching an ignition source and exploding. 217 people were killed and 200 more severely burned.

=== Murdock BLEVEs ===
In 1983 near Murdock, Illinois, at least two tank wagons of a burning derailed train exploded into BLEVEs; one of them was thrown nearly three-quarters mile (1.2 km).

=== Benton fireworks disaster ===
On 27 May 1983, an explosion at an illegal fireworks factory near Benton, Tennessee, killed eleven people, injured one, and caused damage within a radius of several miles. The blast created a mushroom cloud 600 to 800 feet (180 to 240 m) tall and was heard as far as fifteen miles (24 km) away.

=== 1983 Newark explosion ===
On 7 January 1983, an explosion in Newark, New Jersey in the Texaco oil tank farm was felt for 100–130 miles from epicentre, claiming 1 life and injuring 22–24 people.

=== Minor Scale and Misty Picture ===
Many very large detonations have been performed in order to simulate the effects of nuclear weapons on vehicles and other military material. The largest publicly known test was conducted by the United States Defense Nuclear Agency (now part of the Defense Threat Reduction Agency) on 27 June 1985 at the White Sands Missile Range in New Mexico. This test, named Minor Scale, used 4,744 short tons (4,304 t) of ANFO, with a yield of about 4 kt (3,900 long tons; 4,400 short tons). Misty Picture was another similar test a few years later, slightly smaller at 4,685 short tons or 4,250 t.

=== PEPCON disaster ===
On 4 May 1988, about 4,250 short tons (3,860 metric tons) of ammonium perchlorate (NH_{4}ClO_{4}) caught fire and set off explosions near Henderson, Nevada. A 16-inch (41 cm) natural gas pipeline ruptured under the stored ammonium perchlorate and added fuel to the later, larger explosions. There were seven detonations in total, the largest being the last. Two people were killed and hundreds injured. The largest explosion was estimated to be equivalent to 0.25 kilotons of TNT (1.0 TJ). The accident was caught on video by a broadcast engineer servicing a transmitter on Black Mountain, between Henderson and Las Vegas.

=== Arzamas train disaster ===
The Arzamas explosion, known also as Arzamas train disaster, occurred on 4 June 1988, when three goods wagons transporting hexogen to Kazakhstan exploded on a railway crossing in Arzamas, Gorky Oblast, USSR. Explosion of 118 tons of hexogen made a 26-metre (85 ft) deep crater, and caused major damage, killing 91 people and injuring 1,500. 151 buildings were destroyed.

=== Ufa train disaster ===
On 4 June 1989, a gas explosion destroyed two trains (37 cars and two locomotives) in the USSR. At least 575 people died and more than 800 were injured.

=== Intelsat 708 Long March 3B launch failure ===
On 15 February 1996, a Chinese Long March 3B rocket veered off course 2 seconds after clearing the launch tower at the Xichang Satellite Launch Center, then crashed into a nearby village and exploded on impact. The explosion was equivalent to 55 tons of TNT. After the disaster, foreign engineers were kept in a bunker for five hours while, some alleged, the Chinese People's Liberation Army attempted to "clean up" the damage. Xinhua News Agency initially reported 6 deaths and 57 injuries.

=== Enschede fireworks disaster ===
On 13 May 2000, 177 tonnes of fireworks exploded in Enschede, in the Netherlands, in which 23 people were killed and 947 were injured. Due to improper storage and fire precautions made by S.E. Fireworks, the fire that ignited the explosives spread rapidly throughout the compound. The first explosion had the order of 800 kg TNT equivalence; the final explosion was in the range of 4,000–5,000 kg TNT.

== 2001–present ==
=== AZF chemical factory ===
On 21 September 2001, an explosion occurred at a fertilizer factory in Toulouse, France. The disaster caused 31 deaths, 2,500 seriously wounded, and 8,000 minor injuries. The blast (estimated yield of 20–40 tons of TNT) was heard 80 km away (50 miles) and registered 3.4 on the Richter magnitude scale. It damaged about 30,000 buildings over about two-thirds of the city, for an estimated total cost of about €2 billion.

=== Ryongchon disaster ===
A train exploded in North Korea on 22 April 2004. According to officials, 54 people were killed and 1,249 were injured.

=== Seest fireworks disaster ===
On 3 November 2004, about 284 tonnes of fireworks exploded in Kolding, in Denmark. One firefighter was killed, and a mass evacuation of 2,000 people saved many lives. The cost of the damage was estimated at €100 million.

=== Texas City refinery explosion ===
On 23 March 2005, there was a hydrocarbon leak due to incorrect operations during a refinery startup which caused a vapour cloud explosion when ignited by a running vehicle engine. There were 15 deaths and more than 170 injured.

=== 2005 Hertfordshire Oil Storage Terminal fire ===
On 11 December 2005, there was a series of major explosions at the 60,000,000 imp gal (270,000,000 L) capacity Buncefield oil depot near Hemel Hempstead, Hertfordshire, England. The explosions were heard more than 100 mi (160 km) away, as far as the Netherlands and France, and the resulting flames were visible for many miles around the depot. A smoke cloud covered Hemel Hempstead and nearby parts of west Hertfordshire and Buckinghamshire. There were no fatalities, but there were around 43 injuries (2 serious). The British Geological Survey estimated the equivalent yield of the explosion as 29.5 tonnes TNT.

=== Sea Launch failure ===
On 30 January 2007, a Sea Launch Zenit-3SL space rocket exploded on takeoff. The explosion consumed the roughly 400,000 kg (400 t) of paraffin and liquid oxygen aboard. This rocket was launched from an uncrewed ship in the middle of the Pacific Ocean, so there were no casualties; the launch platform was damaged and the NSS-8 satellite was destroyed.

=== 2007 Maputo arms depot explosion ===
On 22 March 2007, there was a series of explosions over 2.5 hours in an arms depot in the Mozambican capital of Maputo. The incident was blamed on high temperatures. Officials confirmed 93 human fatalities and more than 300 injuries.

=== 2008 Gërdec explosions ===
On 15 March 2008, at an ex-military ammunition depot in the village of Gërdec in the Vorë Municipality, Albania (14 kilometres from Tirana, the capital), US and Albanian munitions experts were preparing to destroy stockpiles of obsolete ammunition. The main explosion, involving more than 400 tons of propellant in containers, destroyed hundreds of houses within a few kilometres from the depot and broke windows in cars on the Tirana-Durrës highway. A large fire caused a series of smaller but powerful explosions that continued until 2 a.m. the next day. The explosions could be heard as far away as the Macedonian capital of Skopje, 170 km (110 mi) away. There were 26 killed, 318 houses were destroyed completely, 200 buildings were seriously damaged, and 188 buildings were less seriously damaged.

=== 2009 Cataño oil refinery fire ===
On the morning of 23 October 2009, there was a major explosion at the petrol tanks at the Caribbean Petroleum Corporation oil refinery and oil depot in Bayamón, Puerto Rico. The explosion was seen and heard from 50 miles (80 km) away and left a smoke plume with tops as high as 30,000 feet (9 km). It caused a 3.0 earthquake and blew glass out of windows around the city. The resulting fire was extinguished on 25 October.

=== Ulyanovsk arms depot explosion ===
On 13 and 23 November 2009, 120 tons of Soviet-era artillery shells blew in two separate sets of explosions at the 31st Arsenal of the Caspian Sea Flotilla's ammunition depot near Ulyanovsk, killing ten people.

=== Evangelos Florakis Naval Base explosion ===
About 5:45 am local time on 11 July 2011, a fire at a munitions dump at Evangelos Florakis Naval Base near Zygi, Cyprus, caused the explosion of 98 cargo containers holding various types of munitions. The naval base was destroyed, as was Cyprus' biggest power plant, the "Vassilikos" power plant 500 m (1,600 ft) away. The explosion also caused 13 deaths and more than 60 injuries. Injuries were reported as far as 5 km (3.1 mi) away and damaged houses were reported as far as 10 km (6.2 mi) away. Seismometers at the Mediterranean region recorded the explosion as a M3.0 seismic event.

=== Cosmo Oil Refinery fire ===
On 11 March 2011 in Japan, the Tōhoku earthquake caused natural gas containers in the Cosmo Oil Refinery of Ichihara, Chiba Prefecture, to catch fire, destroying storage tanks and injuring six people. As it burned, several pressurized liquefied propane gas storage tanks exploded into fireballs. It was extinguished by the Cosmo Oil Company on 21 March 2011.

=== Texas fertilizer plant explosion ===
On 17 April 2013, a fire culminating in an explosion shortly before 8 p.m. CDT (00:50 UTC, 18 April) destroyed the West Fertilizer Company plant in West, Texas, United States, located 18 miles (29 km) north of Waco, Texas. The blast killed 15 people, injured more than 160, and destroyed over 150 buildings. The United States Geological Survey recorded the explosion as a 2.1-magnitude earthquake, the equivalent of 7.5–10 tons of TNT.

=== Lac-Mégantic rail disaster ===
On 6 July 2013, a train of 73 tank wagons of light crude oil ran away down a slight incline, after being left unattended for the night, when the air brakes failed after the locomotive engines were shut down following a small fire. It derailed twelve kilometres away in Lac-Mégantic, Quebec, Canada, igniting the Bakken light crude oil from 44 DOT-111 oil tank wagons. Approximately 3–4 minutes after the initial blast, there was a second explosion from 12 oil tank wagons. A series of smaller blasts followed into the early morning hours, igniting the oil of a total 73 oil tank wagons. The disaster is known to have killed 42 people; five more were missing and presumed dead.

=== 2015 Tianjin explosions ===
On 12 August 2015, at 23:30, two explosions occurred in the Chinese port Tianjin at a warehouse operated by Ruihai Logistics. The more powerful explosion was estimated at 336 tons TNT equivalent. 173 people were killed, and 8 remain missing.

=== 2016 Salawa armoury explosion ===
On 5 June 2016, a fire at the largest military armoury in the island nation of Sri Lanka caused a series of explosions that lasted for about 5 hours. One soldier was killed and several others were injured.

=== 2016 San Pablito Market fireworks explosion ===
On 20 December 2016, a fireworks explosion occurred at the San Pablito Market in the city of Tultepec, north of Mexico City. At least 42 people were killed, and dozens injured.

=== 2017 Kalynivka ammunition depot explosion ===
On 6 September 2017, an ammunition explosion occurred at ammunition depot in Kalynivka, near Vinnytsia, Ukraine.

=== 2020 Tarragona IQOXE plant explosion ===
On 14 January 2020, an ethylene oxide tank exploded at the IQOXE (Chemical Industries of Ethylene Oxide) plant in Tarragona (Spain).

=== 2020 Beirut explosion ===
On 4 August 2020, a warehouse containing 2,750 tonnes (3,030 short tons) of ammonium nitrate exploded following a fire in the Port of Beirut, Lebanon. The explosion generated a pressure wave felt more than 240 kilometres (150 mi) away. A study by researchers from the Blast and Impact Dynamics Research Group at the University of Sheffield estimated the energy of the Beirut explosion to be equivalent to 0.5–1.2 kt of TNT. At least 218 people were killed, more than 7,000 injured, and about 300,000 made homeless. Much of central Beirut was devastated by the blast with property damage estimated at US$10–15 billion.

=== 2024 Toropets drone strike ===
A Ukrainian drone attack on a Russian weapons depot in Toropets, Tver Oblast, caused an explosion large enough to be detected as a 2.8 magnitude earthquake by monitoring stations. Local residents were told to evacuate and schools in the region were closed. The largest primary explosion is estimated at 1.8 kiloton leaving an 82m crater. Some 30,000 tonnes of explosives ultimately detonated over the course of several days.

=== Port of Shahid Rajaee explosion ===
On 26 April 2025, a massive explosion occurred following a fire at the port of Shahid Rajaee near Bandar Abbas in southern Iran. At least 70 people were killed and 1,200 others were injured, according to state media reports.

== Comparison with large non-nuclear military ordnance ==
The most powerful non-nuclear weapons ever designed are the United States' MOAB (standing for Massive Ordnance Air Blast, tested in 2003 and used on 13 April 2017, in Achin District, Afghanistan) and the Russian "Father of All Bombs" (tested in 2007). The MOAB contains 18,700 lb (8.5 t) of Composition H6 explosive, which is 1.35 times as powerful as TNT, giving the bomb an approximate yield of 11 t TNT. It would require about 250 MOAB blasts to equal the Halifax explosion (2.9 kt).

== Conventional explosions for nuclear testing ==
Large conventional explosions have been conducted for nuclear testing purposes. Some of the larger ones are listed below.

Event	Explosive used	Amount of explosive	Location	Date
Trinity (100-ton test on tower)	TNT	100 short tons (91 t)	White Sands Proving Grounds	7 May 1945
–	TNT	100 short tons (91 t)	Suffield Experimental Station, Alberta, Canada	3 August 1961
Blowdown	TNT	50 short tons (45 t)	Lockhart River, Queensland	18 July 1963
Snowball	TNT	500 short tons (450 t)	Suffield Experimental Station, Alberta, Canada	17 July 1964
Sailor Hat	TNT	3 tests × 500 short tons (450 t)	Kaho'olawe, Hawaii	1965
Distant Plain	Propane or methane	20 short tons (18 t)	Suffield Experimental Station, Alberta, Canada	1966–1967 (6 tests)
Prairie Flat	TNT	500 short tons (450 t)	Defence Research Establishment Suffield, Alberta, Canada	1968
Dial Pack	TNT	500 short tons (450 t)	Defence Research Establishment Suffield, Alberta, Canada	23 July 1970
Mixed Company 3	TNT	500 short tons (450 t)	Colorado	20 November 1972
Dice Throw	ANFO	620 short tons (560 t)	White Sands Missile Range	6 October 1976
Misers Bluff Phase II	ANFO	1 & 6-simultaneous tests × 120 short tons (110 t)	Planet Ranch, Arizona	Mid-1978
Distant Runner	ANFO	2 tests × 120 short tons (110 t)	White Sands Missile Range	1981
Mill Race	ANFO	620 short tons (560 t)	White Sands Missile Range	16 September 1981
Direct Course	ANFO	609 short tons (552 t)	White Sands Missile Range	26 October 1983
Minor Scale	ANFO	4,744 short tons (4,304 t)	White Sands Missile Range	27 June 1985
Misty Picture	ANFO	4,685 short tons (4,250 t)	White Sands Missile Range	14 May 1987
Misers Gold	ANFO	2,445 short tons (2,218 t)	White Sands Missile Range	1 June 1989
Distant Image	ANFO	2,440 short tons (2,210 t)	White Sands Missile Range	20 June 1991
Minor Uncle	ANFO	2,725 short tons (2,472 t)	White Sands Missile Range	10 June 1993
Non Proliferation Experiment	ANFO	1,410 short tons (1,280 t)	Nevada Test Site	22 September 1993

Other smaller tests include Air Vent I and Flat Top I-III series of 20 tons TNT at Nevada Test Site in 1963–64, Pre Mine Throw and Mine Throw in 1970–1974, Mixed Company 1 & 2 of 20 tons TNT, Middle Gust I-V series of 20 or 100 tons TNT in the early 1970s, Pre Dice Throw and Pre Dice Throw II in 1975, Pre-Direct Course in 1982, SHIST in 1994, and the series Dipole Might in the 1990s and 2000s. Divine Strake was a planned test of 700 tons ANFO at the Nevada Test Site in 2006, but was cancelled.

== Largest accidental artificial non-nuclear explosions by magnitude ==
These yields are approximated by the amount of the explosive material and its properties. They are rough estimates and are not authoritative.

Event	Location	Date	Primary explosive material(s)	Approximate yield	Mean yield
Halifax Explosion	Halifax, Nova Scotia, Canada	6 December 1917	High explosives	2.9 kt (12 TJ)	2.9 kt (12 TJ)
Port Chicago disaster	Port Chicago, California, United States	17 July 1944	Military ammunition	1.6–2.2 kt (6.7–9.2 TJ); some sources suggest as much as 5 kt	1.9 kt (7.9 TJ)
Oppau explosion	Ludwigshafen, Germany	21 September 1921	Ammonium sulfate and ammonium nitrate fertiliser	1–1.2 kt (4.2–5.0 TJ)	1.1 kt (4.6 TJ)
DuPont Powder Mill explosion	Pleasant Prairie, Wisconsin, United States	9 March 1911	Dynamite and gunpowder	1.1 kt (4.6 TJ)	1.1 kt (4.6 TJ)
SS Malakand explosion	Huskisson Dock, Liverpool, United Kingdom	4 May 1941	Military ammunition	1 kt (4.2 TJ)	1 kt (4.2 TJ)
2020 Beirut explosion	Beirut, Lebanon	4 August 2020	Ammonium nitrate	0.50–1.12 kt (2.09–4.69 TJ)	0.8 kt (3.3 TJ)
Texas City disaster	Texas City, Texas, United States	16 April 1947	Ammonium nitrate	0.73–0.86 kt (3.1–3.6 TJ); some sources suggest 3.2 kt	0.79 kt (3.3 TJ)
N1 launch explosion	Baikonur Cosmodrome Site 110, Kazakh SSR, Soviet Union	3 July 1969	Rocket propellant (paraffin and liquid oxygen)	0.3–1 kt (1.3–4.2 TJ); some sources suggest as much as 29 TJ	0.65 kt (2.7 TJ)
Evangelos Florakis Naval Base explosion	Evangelos Florakis Naval Base, Cyprus	11 July 2011	Military ammunition and high explosives	0.48 kt (2.0 TJ)	0.48 kt (2.0 TJ)
2015 Tianjin explosions	Port of Tianjin, China	12 August 2015	Ammonium nitrate and nitrocellulose	0.28–0.33 kt (1.2–1.4 TJ)	0.3 kt (1.3 TJ)
PEPCON disaster	Henderson, Nevada, United States	4 May 1988	Ammonium perchlorate	0.25 kt (1.0 TJ)	0.25 kt (1.0 TJ)

== See also ==
- List of nuclear weapons tests and High explosive nuclear effects testing
- List of accidents and disasters by death toll
- List of accidents and incidents involving transport or storage of ammunition
- SS Richard Montgomery, a Liberty ship that sank in the Thames Estuary off Kent, England, in 1944, with a cargo of 1.4 kt of high explosives. As of 1 June 2024 the cargo remains undetonated.
