= Dolmage and Mason Consulting Engineers =

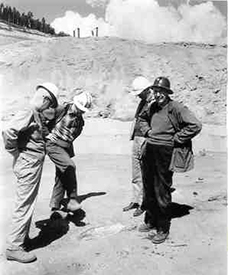
Victor Dolmage inspecting dinosaur tracks on site of the W.A.C. Bennett dam together with business partner Arnold Mærsk Mc-Kinney Møller

Dolmage and Mason Consulting Engineers was an engineering consultancy based in Vancouver. The company was founded by Dr. Victor Dolmage and Charles W. Mason in 1940 and was active until 1961.

Victor Dolmage, considered the first engineering geologist in British Columbia, was a hardrock mining geologist for the GSC (Chief of the BC division from 1922 to 1929), who started his involvement in Geological Engineering by carrying out geological mapping of the tunnel on Mission Mountain as part of the first Bridge River Project for the BC Electric Railway Company. Before the Second World War Victor Dolmage studied in France and worked for the shipping company L. Martin Cie in Paris. He later went on to provide geological input for a large number of BC engineering projects including the Cleveland dam, First Narrows pressure tunnel for the Greater Vancouver Water and Sewage Board, Wahleach power project, The Ripple Rock Explosion, Cheakamus power project, Kemano Tunnel and W.A.C. Bennett dam.

== Sources ==
- Mathews, W. H.(1967): ’Geological Engineering at the University of British Columbia; The British Columbia Professional Engineer, May 1967'
- UBC Geological Engineering
- Early Engineering Geology in Canada – Papers by D.F. VanDine
