= USS Saranac (1848) =

Gunboat of the United States Navy

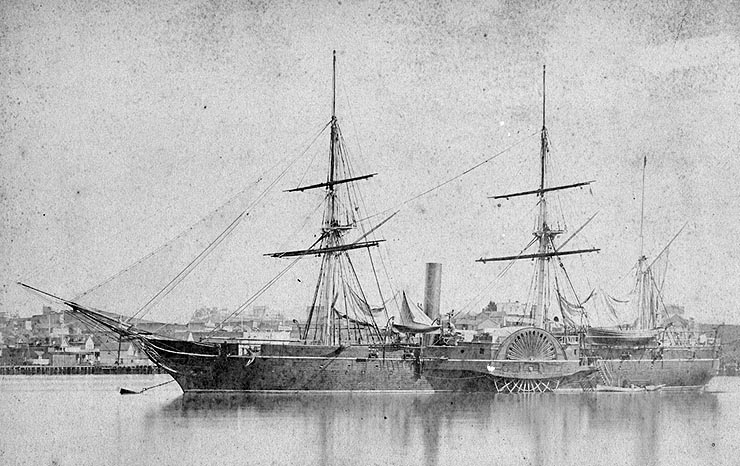
- Saranac in port in the 1870s

History

United States
- Name: USS Saranac
- Namesake: Saranac River
- Builder: Portsmouth Navy Yard, Kittery, Maine
- Laid down: 1847
- Launched: 14 November 1848
- Commissioned: 12 October 1850
- Decommissioned: 20 July 1853
- Recommissioned: 5 November 1853
- Decommissioned: 1 July 1856
- Recommissioned: 17 September 1857
- Decommissioned: 25 January 1869
- Recommissioned: 27 January 1870
- Fate: Wrecked 18 June 1875

General characteristics
- Tonnage: 1,463 tons
- Length: 215 ft 6 in (65.7 m)
- Beam: 37 ft 9 in (11.5 m)
- Draft: 17 ft 4 in (5.3 m)
- Depth of hold: 26 ft 6 in (8.1 m)
- Propulsion: Sail and steam engine; Side wheel-propelled
- Speed: 9 knots (17 km/h; 10 mph)
- Complement: 173
- Armament: 11 × 8-inch (200 mm) guns

USS Saranac was a sloop-of-war of the United States Navy. The ship laid down in 1847 during the Mexican–American War; however, by the time she completed sea trials, the war was over. She was commissioned in 1850 and saw service protecting American interests in the Atlantic Ocean as well as the Pacific Ocean.

When the American Civil War broke out, Saranac patrolled America's West Coast. Retained by the Navy post-war, she continued in service until wrecked on Vancouver Island, British Columbia in 1875.

== Construction ==
The second ship to be so named, Saranac was laid down in 1847 by the Portsmouth Navy Yard, and was launched on 14 November 1848. The new side-wheel steam sloop of war got underway on 10 April 1850 for a trial cruise in the North Atlantic. Upon returning home, she underwent repairs and alterations before commissioning on 12 October 1850, Captain Josiah Tattnall III in command.

== Early operations ==
Saranac operated along the Atlantic coast of the United States in the Home Squadron until being placed in ordinary at Philadelphia on 23 June 1852. Reactivated on 15 September, the ship sailed for New York City to embark the Chevalier de Sodre, the Brazilian minister to the United States, and got underway again on 5 October to return the distinguished diplomat home. She arrived at Pará on the 26th and, after disembarking her passengers, she served on the Brazil Station until returning to Philadelphia and decommissioning on 20 July 1853.

Recommissioned on 5 November 1853, the steamer sailed for the Mediterranean where she operated until returning to Philadelphia on 26 June 1856. She was decommissioned there on 1 July for repair of her machinery and installation of new boilers.

After re-commissioning on 17 September 1857, she got underway to begin the long voyage south round Cape Horn and back up the Pacific Ocean coast of the Americas for duty along the west coast of the United States.

== Civil War ==
She was still performing this duty when the Civil War erupted, and she remained at the task of protecting American commerce along the coast of California throughout the war. After the Confederacy had collapsed, Saranac cruised at sea in search of Southern cruiser, Shenandoah, which remained a menace to Union shipping until belatedly learning of the end of the war.

== Post-war ==
Saranac continued to protect American commerce and interests until ending her longest period in commission on 25 January 1869. Recommissioned on 27 January 1870, the veteran ship resumed operations along the United States West Coast. She operated in that region until she was wrecked at 8.40 a.m. on 18 June 1875 on the submerged Ripple Rock in Seymour Narrows off Campbell River, British Columbia, while on a mission to collect natural curiosities for the Philadelphia Centennial Exposition. Her bow was immediately run into the Vancouver Island shore and made fast with a hawser to a tree, but within an hour she had sunk completely from sight. Lieutenant Commander Sanders, with the pilot and thirteen men, made their way on foot to Victoria. The 173 officers and men of Saranac were brought from Victoria to San Francisco by the SS Pacific. They arrived 1 July 1875 and were landed at Mare Island.
