= Ripple Rock =

Seamount in the Seymour Narrows, British Columbia, Canada; blown up in 1958

- Seamount
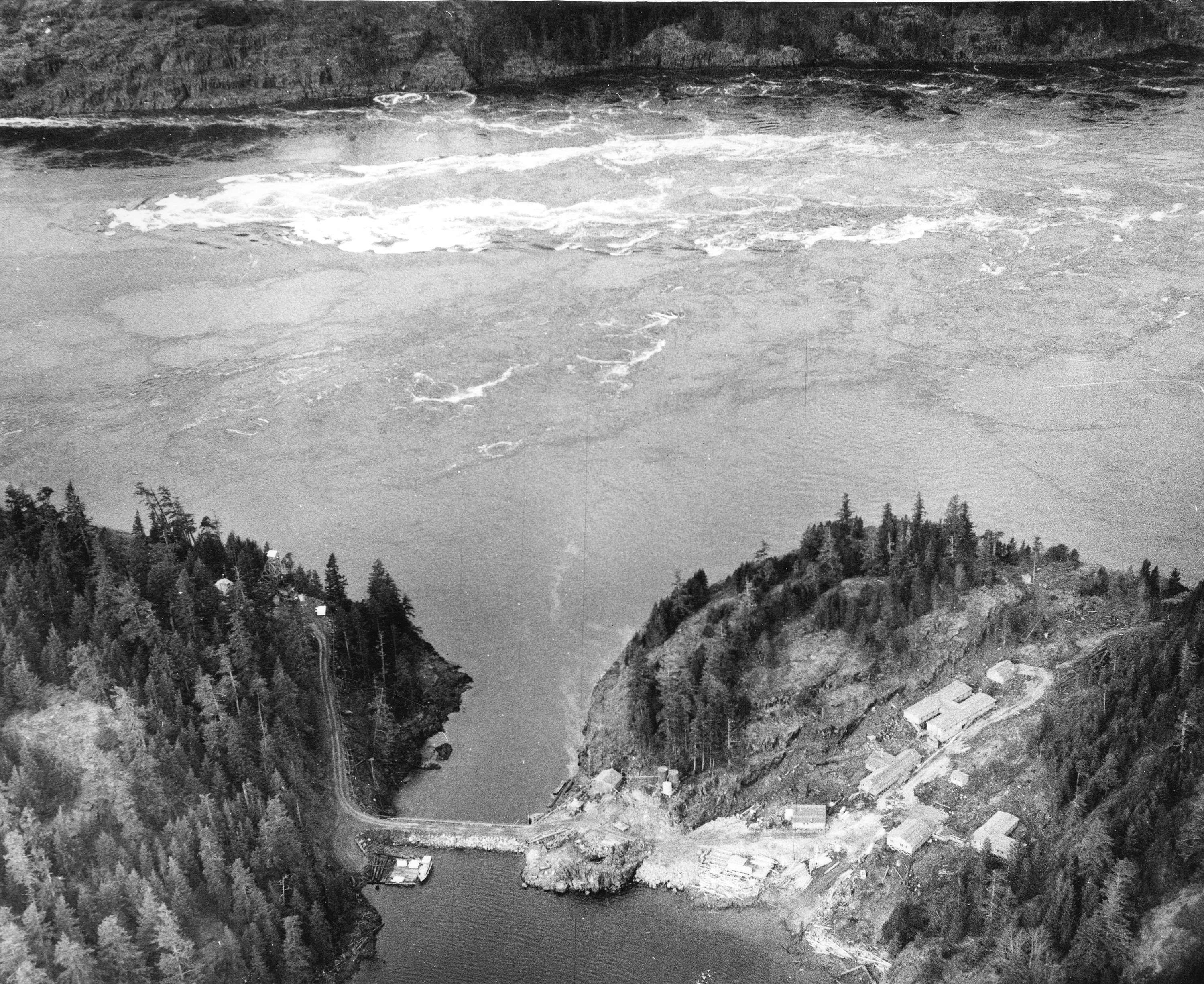
- Aerial view of Ripple Rock in 1957. Note the large, turbulent eddies that formed in its wake during low tide.

- Location within British Columbia
- Coordinates: 50.13175°N 125.35456°W
- Location: Seymour Narrows, British Columbia, Canada
- Topo map: NTS 92K3 Quadra Island

Ripple Rock (French: Roche Ripple) is an underwater mountain located in the Seymour Narrows of the Discovery Passage in British Columbia, Canada. It had two peaks (2.74 metres and 6.4 metres below the surface at low tide) that produced large, dangerous eddies from the strong tidal currents that flowed around them at low tide. Ships transiting the strait preferred to wait until slack tide in order to safely bypass the rock.

The hazardous nature of the rock prompted the Canadian government to remove the top of the mountain in a controlled explosion on 5 April 1958. The event was one of the first live coast-to-coast television broadcasts of an event in Canada and was designated a National Historic Event of Canada.

== Etymology ==
Ripple Rock was so named in 1862 by Captain Richards, RN, because its summits were about at sea level and made a prominent standing wave in the fast tidal current of the strait.

== History ==
The rock was first noted by explorer George Vancouver in 1791, describing it as "one of the vilest stretches of water in the world".

The first known large ship to fall prey to Ripple Rock was the sidewheel steamer Saranac in 1875, as it was heading north to Alaska. At least 20 large and 100 smaller vessels were badly damaged or sunk between then and 1958. At least 110 people drowned in these accidents.

=== Early demolition proposals ===
In the 1860s, a plan was started to link Vancouver Island to the mainland at Bute Inlet, using Ripple Rock as a mid-support for the bridge. This plan continued through the years, and caused political opposition to destroying Ripple Rock, until it was decided to destroy the rock to improve safety for mariners.

As early as 1931, a marine commission recommended removing Ripple Rock, but it was not until 1942 that the government authorized attempts to remove it and issued the first contract to do so.

=== Early attempts ===
The first attempts at planting explosive charges on Ripple Rock were made with floating drilling barges with the goal of blasting the rock into pieces. The first, in 1943, was secured with six 3.8 cm steel cables attached to anchors that altogether weighed 998 metric tons. This approach was abandoned when one cable broke on average every 48 hours. Another attempt in 1945, involving two large overhead steel lines was similarly abandoned after only 93 (out of 1,500 planned) controlled explosions were successful.

=== 1953 feasibility study ===
In 1953, the National Research Council of Canada commissioned a feasibility study on the idea of planting a large explosive charge underneath the peaks by drilling vertical and horizontal shafts from Maud Island in the sound. Based on the study, this approach was recommended. Dolmage and Mason Consulting Engineers were retained to plan the project, and three firms, Northern Construction Company, J.W. Stewart Limited and Boyles Brothers Drilling Company, were granted the contract, which cost in excess of 3 million Canadian dollars (equivalent to $28,585,714 CAD in 2018).

Although not planned as a test for nuclear weapons purposes, this large underground explosion at Ripple Rock was of interest to nuclear weapons scientists at the United Kingdom's Atomic Weapons Research Establishment at Aldermaston, which sent a delegation to Canada and set up various monitoring instruments to record data from the explosion. Little more is known of their objectives, although there are detailed accounts in two declassified documents in the National Archives in London.

== Explosion ==
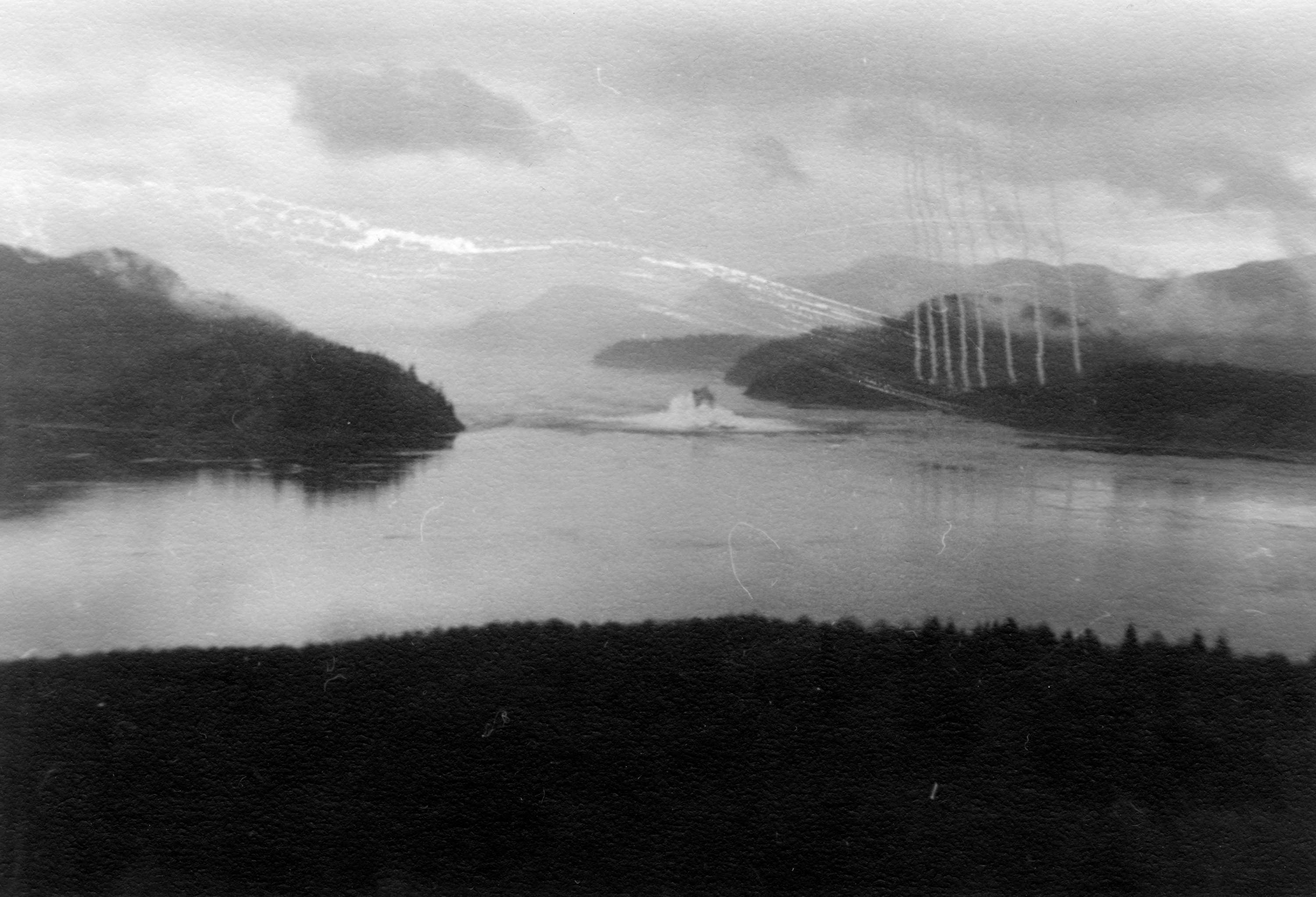
The blast breaches the water's surface immediately following detonation.

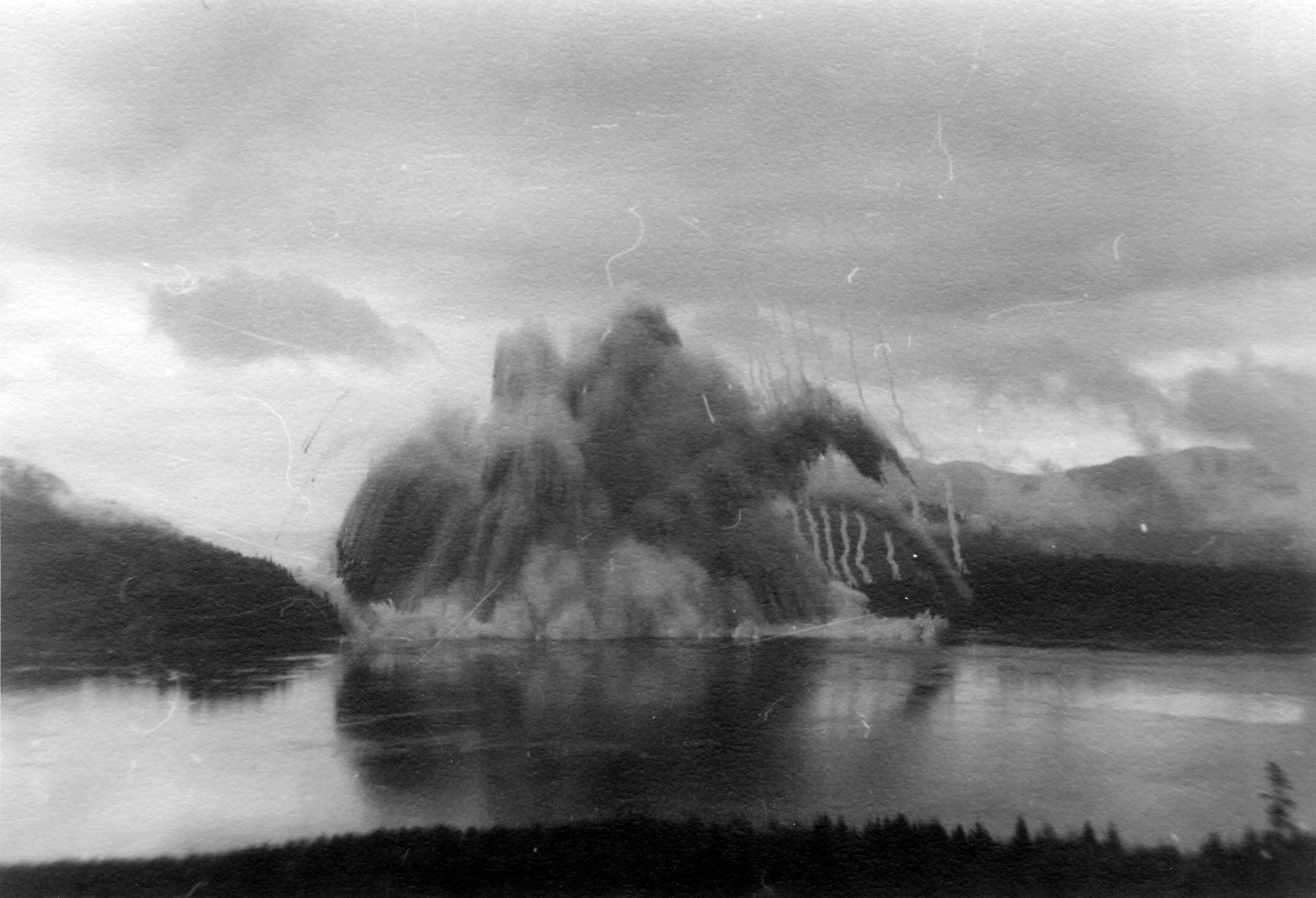
Debris are ejected as a cloud of dust expands across Seymour Narrows.

View of the explosion from the south, looking north, just after 09:31 am local time.

Between November 1955 and April 1958, a three-shift operation involving an average of 75 men worked to build 150 metres (500 ft) of vertical shaft from Maude Island, 720 metres (2,370 ft) of horizontal drift to the base of Ripple Rock, and two main vertical shafts up into the twin peaks, from which "coyote" shafts were drilled for the explosives. The contract was awarded to two firms for $2,639,000. At the time of the contract it was estimated the tunnels and shafts would not be completed until either 1957 or 1958. 1,270 metric tonnes of Nitramex 2H explosive was placed in these shafts, estimated at ten times the amount needed for a similar explosion above water.

The explosion took place at 9:31:02 am on 5 April 1958. 635,000 metric tons of rock and water were displaced by the explosion, spewing debris at least 300 metres in the air which fell on land on either side of the narrows. The blast increased the clearing at low tide to about 14 metres (45 feet). After this, its two peaks were 13.7 m (45 ft) and 15.2 m (50 ft) underwater.

The Royal Canadian Mounted Police had cleared the area of people within 5 kilometres (3 mi) of the explosion, and the engineers and TV crew that witnessed the explosion were housed in a bunker.

The explosion was noted as one of the largest non-nuclear planned explosions on record, though Soviet authorities reported a larger explosion in the Ural Mountains to carve a new channel for the Kolonga River and in China to open a copper mine.

== Cultural references ==
Vancouver based punk rock band the Evaporators' 2004 album was named after Ripple Rock and includes a song that details its history and destruction.

The first song recorded about the blasting of Ripple Rock was named "Ripple Rock" and was recorded by Canadian folk and country singer Stu Davis.

In 2008 Campbell River celebrated the 50th anniversary of the blast with a commemorative blast done by a Vancouver special effects company. It took place at 9:31:02 AM, on 5 April 2008.

== See also ==
- List of the largest artificial non-nuclear explosions
- Removal of Hell Gate rocks
