= Nitramex and Nitramon Explosives =

Explosives based on ammonium nitrate

Nitramex and Nitramon Explosives are compositions of various chemical compounds. They are explosives based on ammonium nitrate, with other ingredients such as paraffin wax, aluminum and dinitrotoluene. The inclusion of these additional ingredients creates a more stable explosive. Nitramex and Nitramon have in modern times been replaced by more advanced high explosives based on ammonium nitrate, such as ANFO.

== Nitramon ==
A typical nitramon formula contains approximately 92 percent ammonium nitrate, 4 percent dinitrotoluene and 4 percent paraffin wax.

Nitramon is insensitive to shock, friction, flame and impact. It can't be detonated by blasting cap and requires booster to set it off. Different grades of Nitramon were produced, including S and WW for seismic exploration and HH for blasting in high temperature environments, like coal-seam fires.

== Nitramex ==
Nitramex has much the same formula as nitramon but with the addition of trinitrotoluene (TNT). It has higher density and explosive strength than Nitramon. Nitramex was developed for blasting hard rock.

This explosive was used in the removal of Ripple Rock. Large quantities of Nitramex 2H (over a thousand tonnes) were packed into tunnels. The explosion, in 1958, was one of the largest non-nuclear explosions in history.
